= List of Vogue Japan cover models =

This list of Vogue Japan cover models (1999–present) is a catalog of cover models who have appeared on the cover of Vogue Japan, the Japanese edition of American fashion magazine Vogue. From 1999 to 2011 the magazine was named Vogue Nippon.

== 1990s ==
=== 1999 ===
| Issue | Cover model | Photographer |
|---|---|---|
| Spring (Test Issue) | Jacquetta Wheeler | Satoshi Saïkusa |
| September | Kate Moss, Miki | Craig McDean |
| October | Jacquetta Wheeler | Mario Testino |
| November | Naomi Campbell | Mario Testino |
| December | Milla Jovovich | Craig McDean |

== 2000s ==
=== 2000 ===
| Issue | Cover model | Photographer |
|---|---|---|
| January | Maggie Rizer | Tom Munro |
| February | Carolyn Murphy | Mario Testino |
| March | Trish Goff | Wayne Maser |
| April | Angela Lindvall | Craig McDean |
| May | Gisele Bündchen | Sean Ellis |
| June | Ayumi Tanabe | Raymond Meier |
| July | Hilary Swank | Craig McDean |
| August | Maggie Rizer | Richard Burbridge |
| September | Kirsty Hume; Donovan Leitch | Mario Testino |
| October | Christy Turlington | Craig McDean |
| November | Claire Danes | Michael Thompson |
| December | Ai Tominaga | Raymond Meier |

=== 2001 ===
| Issue | Cover model | Photographer |
|---|---|---|
| January | Angela Lindvall | Thomas Schenk |
| February | Caroline Ribeiro | Tom Munro |
| March | Kate Moss | Tesh Patel |
| April | Tetyana Brazhnyk | |
| May | Devon Aoki | Michael Thompson |
| June | Maggie Rizer | Koto Bolofo |
| July | Olga Smagina | Koto Bolofo |
| August | Anne-Catherine Lacroix; Hannelore Knuts; Kim Peers; Anouck Lepère; Delfine Bafort | Tesh Patel |
| September | Tasha Tilberg | Tesh Patel |
| October | Stella Tennant | Nathaniel Goldberg |
| November | Trish Goff | Nathaniel Goldberg |
| December | —N/a | |

=== 2002 ===
| Issue | Cover model | Photographer |
|---|---|---|
| January | An Oost | Tom Munro |
| February | Anouck Lepere | Craig McDean |
| March | Beth Houfek | Richard Burbridge |
| April | Carolyn Murphy | Craig McDean |
| May | Audrey Marnay | Raymond Meier |
| June | Bridget Hall | Tesh Patel |
| July | Carmen Maria Hillestad | Mikael Jansson |
| August | Shalom Harlow | Tim Walker |
| September | Carmen Kass | Craig McDean |
| October | Natalia Vodianova | Craig McDean |
| November | Angela Lindvall | Craig McDean |
| December | Bridget Hall | Craig McDean |

=== 2003 ===
| Issue | Cover model | Photographer |
|---|---|---|
| January | Linda Evangelista | Craig McDean |
| February | Trish Goff | Craig McDean |
| March | Élise Crombez | David Sims |
| April | Élise Crombez | |
| May | Jessica Miller | David Sims |
| June | Natalia Vodianova | David Sims |
| July | Karolína Kurková | David Sims |
| August | Adina Fohlin | Sølve Sundsbø |
| September | Hana Soukupová | Sølve Sundsbø |
| October | Eugenia Volodina | Sølve Sundsbø |
| November | Stella Tennant | Sølve Sundsbø |
| December | Diana Dondoe | Sølve Sundsbø |

=== 2004 ===
| Issue | Cover model | Photographer |
|---|---|---|
| January | Liya Kebede | Sølve Sundsbø |
| February | Louise Pedersen | Craig McDean |
| March | Daria Werbowy | Craig McDean |
| April | Carmen Kass | Craig McDean |
| May | Angela Lindvall | Craig McDean |
| June | Élise Crombez | Craig McDean |
| July | Gisele Bündchen | Craig McDean |
| August | Julia Stegner | Craig McDean |
| September | Gemma Ward | Craig McDean |
| October | Natalia Vodianova | Craig McDean |
| November | Jessica Stam | Craig McDean |
| December | Natalia Vodianova | Craig McDean |

=== 2005 ===
| Issue | Cover model | Photographer |
|---|---|---|
| January | Natasha Poly | Craig McDean |
| February | Lily Donaldson | Craig McDean |
| March | Julia Stegner | Craig McDean |
| April | Gemma Ward | Craig McDean |
| May | Gemma Ward | Craig McDean |
| June | Luca Gajdus | |
| July | Karen Elson | Craig McDean |
| August | Doutzen Kroes | Craig McDean |
| September | Hana Soukupová | Craig McDean |
| October | Jeísa Chiminazzo | Craig McDean |
| November | Julia Stegner | Craig McDean |
| December | Daria Werbowy | Craig McDean |

=== 2006 ===
| Issue | Cover model | Photographer |
|---|---|---|
| January | Caroline Trentini | Craig McDean |
| February | Nicole Kidman | Craig McDean |
| March | Gemma Ward | Craig McDean |
| April | Sasha Pivovarova | Craig McDean |
| May | Jessica Stam | Craig McDean |
| June | Lily Donaldson | Craig McDean |
| July | Julia Stegner | Craig McDean |
| August | Natalia Vodianova | Craig McDean |
| September | Natalia Vodianova | Craig McDean |
| October | Stella Tennant | Craig McDean |
| November | Doutzen Kroes | Craig McDean |
| December | Gemma Ward | Craig McDean |

=== 2007 ===
| Issue | Cover model | Photographer |
|---|---|---|
| January | Gisele Bündchen | Craig McDean |
| February | Sasha Pivovarova; Coco Rocha | Craig McDean |
| March | Vlada Roslyakova | Craig McDean |
| April | Jessica Stam | Craig McDean |
| May | Coco Rocha | Craig McDean |
| June | Doutzen Kroes | Craig McDean |
| July | Lara Stone | Craig McDean |
| August | Jessica Stam | Craig McDean |
| September | Sasha Pivovarova | Craig McDean |
| October | Jessica Stam | Craig McDean |
| November | Tanya Dziahileva | Craig McDean |
| December | Lily Donaldson | Craig McDean |

=== 2008 ===
| Issue | Cover model | Photographer |
|---|---|---|
| January | Snejana Onopka | Craig McDean |
| February | Kate Moss | Inez & Vinoodh |
| March | Angela Lindvall | Inez & Vinoodh |
| April | Daria Werbowy | Inez & Vinoodh |
| May | Christy Turlington | Inez & Vinoodh |
| June | Stella Tennant | Inez & Vinoodh |
| July | Raquel Zimmermann | Inez & Vinoodh |
| August | Sasha Pivovarova | Inez & Vinoodh |
| September | Natasha Poly | Inez & Vinoodh |
| October | Lily Donaldson | Inez & Vinoodh |
| November | Freja Beha Erichsen | Inez & Vinoodh |
| December | Raquel Zimmermann | Inez & Vinoodh |

=== 2009 ===
| Issue | Cover model | Photographer |
|---|---|---|
| January | Daria Werbowy | Inez & Vinoodh |
| February | Freja Beha Erichsen | Inez & Vinoodh |
| March | Anna Selezneva | Inez & Vinoodh |
| April | Lara Stone | Inez & Vinoodh |
| May | Enikő Mihalik | Inez & Vinoodh |
| June | Natasha Poly | Inez & Vinoodh |
| July | Kate Moss | Inez & Vinoodh |
| August | Anja Rubik | Inez & Vinoodh |
| September | Iris Strubegger | Inez & Vinoodh |
| October | Raquel Zimmermann | Mario Sorrenti |
| November | Tao Okamoto | Inez & Vinoodh |
| December | Sasha Pivovarova | Inez & Vinoodh |

== 2010s ==
=== 2010 ===
| Issue | Cover model | Photographer |
|---|---|---|
| January | Daria Werbowy | Inez & Vinoodh |
| February | Abbey Lee Kershaw | Inez & Vinoodh |
| March | Isabeli Fontana | Inez & Vinoodh |
| April | Daria Werbowy | Mikael Jansson |
| May | Lily Donaldson | Inez & Vinoodh |
| June | Raquel Zimmermann | Inez & Vinoodh |
| July | Alessandra Ambrosio | Inez & Vinoodh |
| August | Abbey Lee Kershaw | Inez & Vinoodh |
| September | Natasha Poly | Inez & Vinoodh |
| October | Raquel Zimmermann | Mario Sorrenti |
| November | Lily Donaldson | Inez & Vinoodh |
| December | Sasha Pivovarova | Inez & Vinoodh |

=== 2011 ===
| Issue | Cover model | Photographer |
|---|---|---|
| January | Gisele Bündchen | Mario Sorrenti |
| February | Karen Elson | Inez & Vinoodh |
| March | Izabel Goulart | Inez & Vinoodh |
| April | Bambi Northwood-Blyth; Britt Maren; Milou van Groesen; Fei Fei Sun | Inez & Vinoodh |
| May | Kate Moss | Mert & Marcus |
| June | Naomi Campbell | Inez & Vinoodh |
| July | Abbey Lee Kershaw | Mario Sorrenti |
| August | Daphne Groeneveld | Mario Sorrenti |
| September | Karolína Kurková | Inez & Vinoodh |
| October | Florence Welch | Karl Lagerfeld |
| November | Lara Stone | Mario Sorrenti |
| December | Aymeline Valade | Giampaolo Sgura |

=== 2012 ===
| Issue | Cover model | Photographer |
|---|---|---|
| January | Maryna Linchuk | Giampaolo Sgura |
| February | Saskia de Brauw | Sølve Sundsbø |
| March | Bianca Balti | Giampaolo Sgura |
| April | Kate Moss | Mert & Marcus |
| May | Natasha Poly | Daniele & Iango |
| June | Candice Swanepoel | Terry Richardson |
| July | Daria Werbowy | Inez & Vinoodh |
| August | Anja Rubik | Giampaolo Sgura |
| September | Karlie Kloss | Mikael Jansson |
| October | Daria Strokous | Inez & Vinoodh |
| November | Aymeline Valade | Patrick Demarchelier |
| December | Kendra Spears | Giampaolo Sgura |

=== 2013 ===
| Issue | Cover model | Photographer |
|---|---|---|
| January | Joan Smalls | Terry Richardson |
| February | Vanessa Axente | Patrick Demarchelier |
| March | Lindsey Wixson | Patrick Demarchelier |
| April | Doutzen Kroes | Mikael Jansson |
| May | Kati Nescher | Mikael Jansson |
| June | Karlie Kloss | Hedi Slimane |
| July | Bette Franke | Giampaolo Sgura |
| August | Sasha Pivovarova | Patrick Demarchelier |
| September | Cara Delevingne | Patrick Demarchelier |
| October | Tao Okamoto | Patrick Demarchelier |
| November | Karlie Kloss | Patrick Demarchelier |
| December | Daria Strokous | Sølve Sundsbø |

=== 2014 ===
| Issue | Cover model | Photographer |
|---|---|---|
| January | Karlie Kloss | Patrick Demarchelier |
| February | Natasha Poly | Patrick Demarchelier |
| March | Ondria Hardin | Giampaolo Sgura |
| April | Edie Campbell | Patrick Demarchelier |
| May | Vanessa Axente | Willy Vanderperre |
| June | Doutzen Kroes | Patrick Demarchelier |
| July | Georgia May Jagger | Willy Vanderperre |
| August | Lindsey Wixson | Giampaolo Sgura |
| September | Claudia Schiffer; Nadja Auermann; Stephanie Seymour; Linda Evangelista; Naomi Campbell; Carolyn Murphy; Eva Herzigová; Guinevere Van Seenus; Karen Elson; Maggie Rizer; Saskia de Brauw; Tao Okamoto; Małgosia Bela; Mariacarla Boscono; Natasha Poly | Luigi & Iango |
| October | Cara Delevingne | Patrick Demarchelier |
| November | Miranda Kerr | Mario Testino |
| December | Joan Smalls | Giampaolo Sgura |

=== 2015 ===
| Issue | Cover model | Photographer |
|---|---|---|
| January | Sasha Pivovarova | Patrick Demarchelier |
| February | Rinko Kikuchi | Tom Craig |
| March | Natalia Vodianova | Patrick Demarchelier |
| April | Vanessa Moody; Amanda Murphy; Lexi Boling; Suvi Koponen; Binx Walton; Liu Wen; Daria Strokous; Ondria Hardin; Natalie Westling; Malaika Firth; Sam Rollinson; Issa Lish; Jamie Bochert; Maartje Verhoef; Chiharu Okunugi | Luigi & Iango |
| May | Léa Seydoux | Paolo Roversi |
| June | Natasha Poly | Giampaolo Sgura |
| July | Rosie Huntington-Whiteley | Giampaolo Sgura |
| August | Riccardo Tisci; Jessica Chastain; Kanye West; Jamie Bochert; Joan Smalls; Kendall Jenner; Mica Argañaraz; Akimoto Kozue | Luigi & Iango |
| September | Katy Perry | Giampaolo Sgura |
| October | Caroline Trentini | Giampaolo Sgura |
| November | Kendall Jenner | Luigi & Iango |
| December | Freja Beha Erichsen | Patrick Demarchelier |

=== 2016 ===
| Issue | Cover model | Photographer |
|---|---|---|
| January | Jourdan Dunn | Giampaolo Sgura |
| February | Doutzen Kroes | Patrick Demarchelier |
| March | Fernanda Ly | Ezra Petronio |
| April | Edie Campbell | Luigi & Iango |
| May | Natasha Poly | Luigi & Iango |
| June | Binx Walton | Giampaolo Sgura |
| July | Mica Argañaraz | Richard Burbridge |
| August | Irina Shayk | Giampaolo Sgura |
| September | Bella Hadid | Giampaolo Sgura |
| October | Kendall Jenner | Luigi & Iango |
| November | Grace Hartzel | Patrick Demarchelier |
| December | Gigi Hadid | Luigi & Iango |

=== 2017 ===
| Issue | Cover model | Photographer |
|---|---|---|
| January | Anna Ewers | Luigi & Iango |
| February | Agnes Åkerlund; Odette Pavlova; Vittoria Ceretti; Yasmin Wijnaldum; Ruth Bell; Faretta; Yoon Young Bae; Selena Forrest; Jessie Bloemendaal; Ellen Rosa; Camille Hurel; Stella Maxwell; Birgit Kos; Imaan Hammam; Marjan Jonkman | Luigi & Iango |
| March | Irina Shayk | Luigi & Iango |
| April | Vittoria Ceretti | Luigi & Iango |
| May | Imaan Hammam | Giampaolo Sgura |
| June | Rila Fukushima; Nicolas Ghesquière; Léa Seydoux; Jennifer Connelly; Michelle Williams | Patrick Demarchelier |
| July | Anna Cleveland; Molly Bair; Georgia Howorth | Paolo Roversi |
| August | Delilah Belle; Kenya Kinski-Jones; Corinne Foxx; Marina Ruy Barbosa; Caroline Daur; Harley Viera-Newton; Danni Li; Chloe Bailey; Halle Bailey; Helena Bordon; Aimee Song; Kendall Visser; Maria Olympia; Oliver Cheshire; Pixie Lott; Sailor Brinkley-Cook; Lady Kitty Spencer; Lana El Sahely; Marcus Butler; Stefanie Giesinger; Marie-Ange Casta; Phoebe-élena Merryweather; Eugenia Weinstein; Rose Gilroy; Sasha Spilberg; Roos Abels; Bianca Balti; Maria Bogdanovich; Iara Jereissati; Stella Aminova; Charlotte Olympia; Andrea Dellal; Lele Pons; Marjorie Elaine Harvey; Natasha Lau; Yumi Dondo; Maddi Waterhouse; Michelle Salas; Fil Xiaobai Kang Seung Hyun; Lady Amelia Windsor; Praya Lundberg; Lisa Rinna; Lori Harvey; Viva Gore; Adriana Mora; Renee Stewart; Mackinley Hill; Sylvie Makower; Coco König; Grazi Massafera; Amanda Harvey; Izzy Getty; Karsen Liotta; Alexandra Pereira; Madison Beer; Olivia Banks; Ella Hope Merryweather; Shea Marie; Kristina Bazan; Rachel Yeoh; Michelle Yeoh; Negin Mirsalehi; Taro Pedersen; Sofia Richie; KOM I Alice Dellal | The Morelli Brothers |
| September | Lara Stone; Joan Smalls; Natasha Poly; Doutzen Kroes; Vittoria Ceretti; Anna Ewers | Luigi & Iango |
| October | Mica Argañaraz; Yoshiki | Luigi & Iango |
| November | Gigi Hadid | Luigi & Iango |
| December | Nikolai Danielsen; Taylor Hill; Jonathan Bellini; Jhonattan Burjack | Giampaolo Sgura |

=== 2018 ===
| Issue | Cover model | Photographer |
|---|---|---|
| January | Lily-Rose Depp | Peter Lindbergh |
| February | Gisele Bündchen | Luigi & Iango |
| March | Luna Bijl; Lexi Boling; Kiki Willems; Selena Forrest | Luigi & Iango |
| April | Christy Turlington | Inez & Vinoodh |
| May | Bella Hadid | Patrick Demarchelier |
| June | Gigi Hadid | Luigi & Iango |
| July | Lexi Boling | Giampaolo Sgura |
| August | Faretta; Joan Smalls; Amber Valletta; Anna Ewers | Luigi & Iango |
| September | Hailey Bieber | The Morelli Brothers |
| October | Namie Amuro | Luigi & Iango |
| November | Elle Fanning | Mert & Marcus |
| December | Kaia Gerber | Luigi & Iango |

=== 2019 ===
| Issue | Cover model | Photographer |
|---|---|---|
| January | Tilda Swinton | Peter Lindbergh |
| February | Nicki Minaj | Mariano Vivanco |
| March | Mariacarla Boscono; Chiharu Okunugi; Irina Shayk; Natasha Poly; Imaan Hammam | Luigi & Iango |
| April | Shalom Harlow | Luigi & Iango |
| May | Miki Ehara; Uta Uchida | Giampaolo Sgura |
| June | Naomi Campbell | Luigi & Iango |
| July | Bella Hadid | Luigi & Iango |
| August | Kim Kardashian | Luigi & Iango |
| August | Vittoria Ceretti | Luigi & Iango |
| September | Rebecca Leigh Longendyke; Hikari Mori; Anok Yai; Adut Akech; Kris Grikaite; Fran Summers | Luigi & Iango |
| October | Alicia Vikander | Collier Schorr |
| November | Adut Akech | Albert Watson |
| December | Shota Matsuda & Kozue Akimoto | Juergen Teller |

== 2020s ==
=== 2020 ===
| Issue | Cover model | Photographer |
|---|---|---|
| January | Grace Elizabeth & Anok Yai | Nick Knight |
| February | Irina Shayk | Giampaolo Sgura |
| March | Adriana Lima; Doutzen Kroes; Candice Swanepoel; Sui He; Joan Smalls; Stella McCartney | Luigi & Iango |
| April | Candice Swanepoel | Luigi & Iango |
| May | Cocomi | Luigi & Iango |
| June | Abby Champion; Bente Oort; Hannah Motler; Mika Schneider; Shanelle Nyasiase | Luigi & Iango |
| July | Kendall Jenner | Giampaolo Sgura |
| July | Stella Maxwell | Giampaolo Sgura |
| August | Binx Walton; Felize Kolibius; Jill Kortleve; Mika Schneider; Sacha Quenby; Sora Choi; Valerie Scherzinger | Luigi & Iango |
| September | Aliet Sarah | Luigi & Iango |
| September | Amar Akway | Luigi & Iango |
| September | Kaia Gerber | Luigi & Iango |
| September | Mayowa Nicholas | Luigi & Iango |
| September | Shanelle Nyasiase | Luigi & Iango |
| October | —N/a | Takashi Murakami |
| November | Vittoria Ceretti | Luigi & Iango |
| December | Bella Hadid | Luigi & Iango |

=== 2021 ===
| Issue | Cover model | Photographer |
|---|---|---|
| January | Mona Tougaard | Giampaolo Sgura |
| February | Rianne Van Rompaey | Luigi & Iango |
| March | Shanelle Nyasiase; He Cong; Natasha Poly; Edita Vilkevičiūtė; Kayako Higuchi | Luigi & Iango |
| April | Lila Moss | Luigi & Iango |
| May | Imaan Hammam | Luigi & Iango |
| June | Lisa | Kim Hee June |
| July | Mica Argañaraz | Inez & Vinoodh |
| August | Naomi Osaka | Zoey Grossman |
| September | Vilma Sjöberg; Amane Taniguchi; Britt Oosten; Sora Choi; Malika Louback; Ugbad Abdi; Leon Dame | Luigi & Iango |
| October | Haruka Toyoda | Yasutomo Ebisu |
| November | Cara Delevingne | Camilla Åkrans |
| December | Kayako Higuchi | Juergen Teller |

=== 2022 ===
| Issue | Cover model | Photographer |
|---|---|---|
| January | Ai Hashizume; Danil Uspenskiy; Kanon Hirata; Kohei Takabatake; Miyu Onodera | Yasutomo Ebisu |
| February | Mika Schneider | Camilla Åkrans |
| March | Hoyeon Jung | Harley Weir |
| April | Yumi Nu | Nathaniel Goldberg |
| May | Mika Schneider | Nathaniel Goldberg |
| June | Maryel Uchida | Hanna Moon |
| July | Hikaru Utada | Shoji Uchida |
| August | Stella Maxwell | Tanya and Zhenya Posternak |
| September | Tsubasa Honda | Takuya Uchiyama |
| October | Eve Jobs | Heji Shin |
| November | Grace Valentine; Janet Jumbo; Natalie Nootenboom; Amber Later | Cruz Valdez |
| December | Rei | Yoon Song-yi |

=== 2023 ===
| Issue | Cover model | Photographer |
|---|---|---|
| January | Lulu Wood | Hugo Comte |
| January | Rie Miyazawa | Kishin Shinoyama |
| February | Iris Law | Marie Higuchi |
| March | Momo; Sana; Mina | Yeongjun Kim |
| April | Amelia Gray Hamlin | Heji Shin |
| May | Ai Tominaga | Lee Sang Hun |
| June | Kristen McMenamy | Paul Kooiker |
| July | Jennie | Hong Janghyun |
| August | Suga | Won Tae Go |
| September | Hailey Bieber | Richard Burbridge |
| October | Mona Tougaard | Hugo Comte |
| November | Devon Aoki; Eleanor Talitha Bailey | Theo Liu |
| December | Abény Nhial; Mary Ukech | Hugo Comte |

=== 2024 ===
| Issue | Cover model | Photographer |
|---|---|---|
| January | XG | Kizen |
| February | Selena Gomez | Michael Bailey-Gates |
| March | Sora Choi | Peter Ash Lee |
| April | Anok Yai | Heji Shin |
| May | Jang Won-young | Kim Heejune |
| June | Kate Moss | Nikolai von Bismarck |
| July | Angelina Jolie | Takuya Uchiyama |
| August | Sho Hirano | Kizhen Zhao |
| September | Yumi Nu | Felicity Ingram |
| October | Lisa | Go Won-tae |
| November | Kayako Higuchi | Nick Yang |
| December | Jin | Kim Heejune |

=== 2025 ===
| Issue | Cover model | Photographer |
|---|---|---|
| January - Special 25th Anniversary issue | Ai Tominaga | Nick Yang |
| January | Nana Komatsu | Joshua Woods |
| February | Lulu Tenney | Jack Day |
| March | Mina | Hyea W. Kang |
| April | Amelia Gray | Mikael Jansson |
| May | Mona Kawasaki; Raul Murakami | Petra Collins |
| June | Kiko Mizuhara | Bon Duke |
| July | Anna Sawai | Nick Yang |
| August | Alex Consani | Hyea W. Kang |
| September | Ren Meguro | Pak Bae |
| October | Hikari Mori | Pablo Sáez |
| November | Lila Moss | Roe Ethridge |
| December | Rina Sawayama | Sean+Seng |

=== 2026 ===
| Issue | Cover model | Photographer |
|---|---|---|
| January | Chloe Oh | Fumiko Imano |
| February | V | Park Jong Ha |
| March | Ariana Grande | Michael Bailey-Gates |
| April | Chanmina | Chikashi Suzuki |
| May | Anok Yai | Xiangyu Liu |
| June | Chen Yang, Yura Romaniuk | Ethan James Green |
| July | Kayako Higuchi, Mika Schneider, Mona Kawasaki, Peng Chang | Fumiko Imano |
| August | Yumi Kawai | Keizō Kitajima |
| September | Masami Nagasawa | Lukas Wassmann |
| October | Tilda Swinton | Zhong Ling |
| November | Kayako Higuchi | Kodai Ikemitsu |
| December | Ida Heiner | Oliver Hadlee Pearch |

== See also ==
- List of Harper's Bazaar Japan cover models
- List of L'Officiel Japan cover models
