= List of Vogue Hong Kong cover models =

This list of Vogue Hong Kong cover models (2019–present) is a catalog of cover models who have appeared on the cover of Vogue Hong Kong, the Hong Kong edition of American fashion magazine Vogue.

== 2010s ==
=== 2019 ===
Issue	Cover model	Photographer	Ref.
March	Fei Fei Sun, Gigi Hadid	Nick Knight	
April	Qi Qi, Ella Yam	Mariano Vivanco	
May	Sara Grace Wallerstedt	Petra Collins	
June	Irina Shayk	Hugo Comte	
July	Shu Qi	Chen Man	
August	Angelababy	Wing Shya	
September	Rihanna	Hanna Moon	
October	Carina Lau	William Chang	
November	Adwoa Aboah	Nick Knight	
December	Hailey Bieber	Cass Bird	

== 2020s ==
=== 2020 ===
Issue	Cover model	Photographer
January	He Cong, Hyun Ji Shin, Fernanda Ly	Hyea W. Kang
February	Bella Hadid	Zoey Grossman
March	Naomi Campbell	Chris Colls
April	Joey Yung	Luigi & Iango
May	Chutimon Chuengcharoensukying	Tada Varich
June/July	Natalia Vodianova	Luigi & Iango
August	Kylie Jenner	Greg Swales
September	Sammi Cheng	Luke Casey
October	Chiara Ferragni	Michal Pudelka
November	Zendaya	Djeneba Aduayom
December	Song Hye Kyo	Hong Jang Hyun

=== 2021 ===
Issue	Cover model	Photographer	Ref.
January	Gigi Lai	Wing Shya	
February	Akon Changkou, Estelle Chen, Lexi Boling, Luna Bijl, Taylor Hill	Luigi & Iango	
March	Kate Moss	Luigi & Iango	
April	Gisele Bündchen	Kevin O’Brien	
May	Kendall Jenner	Zoey Grossman	
June	Han Hyo-joo	Hong Jang Hyun	
July	Lisa	Kim Hee June	
August	Cecilia Cheung	Wing Shya	
September	Vittoria Cerretti	Luigi & Iango	
September	Adut Akech	Luigi & Iango	
September	Sora Choi	Luigi & Iango	
September	Jill Kortleve	Luigi & Iango	
October	Lila Moss	Felix Cooper	
November	Fala Chen	Walter Chin	
December	Lily Collins	Greg Swales	

=== 2022 ===
Issue	Cover model	Photographer
January	BTS	Hyea W. Kang
February	Willow Smith	Luigi & Iango
February	Iris Law	Luigi & Iango
February	Ayla Yuet Sham	Ken Ngan
March	Louise Wong	Wing Shya
April	Kim Kardashian	Greg Swales
May	Mika Schneider	Luigi & Iango
June	Millie Bobby Brown	Paola Kudacki
July	Sydney Sweeney	Petra Collins
August	Kim Tae-ri	Kim Yeong-jun
September	Brooklyn Beckham; Nicola Peltz	Greg Swales
October	Yumi Nu, Sherry Shi, Chloe Oh, Yoonmi Sun, Kayako Higuchi	Hyea W. Kang
November	Anne Hathaway	Daniel Jackson
December	Rosé	Kim Hee June

=== 2023 ===
Issue	Cover model	Photographer
January	Eileen Gu	Paola Kudacki
February	Chow Yun-fat; Cheung Ka Long	Issac Lam
March	Shalom Harlow; Amber Valletta	Craig McDean
April	Ayaka Miyoshi	Kim Yeong Jun
May	Vivienne Rohner	Leslie Zhang JiaCheng
June	Amanda Seyfried	Michael Schwartz
July	Gal Gadot	Greg Swales
August	Gianna Jun	Jooyoung Ahn
August	Bright Vachirawit	Sootket Jiwpanit
September	Abby Champion; Selena Forrest; Qun Ye; Lineisy Montero; Cara Taylor	Luigi & Iango
October	Michelle Reis	Wing Shya
October	Lee Jung Jae	Wing Shya
November	Cathy Chui Lee	Jongha Park
December	Haerin	Jongha Park

=== 2024 ===
Issue	Cover model	Photographer	Ref.
January	Keung To	Leung Mo	
February	Lim Yoona	Mok Jungwook	
March	Louis Koo	Jumbo Tsui	
March	Chrissie Chau	Jumbo Tsui	
March	Terrance Lau	Jumbo Tsui	
March	Jennifer Yu	Jumbo Tsui	
March	Will Or	Jumbo Tsui	
March	Gaile Lok	Hong Jang Hyun	
March	Qi Qi	Hong Jang Hyun	
March	Janet Ma	Hong Jang Hyun	
March	Kathy Chow Man-kei	Hong Jang Hyun	
March	Amanda Strang	Hong Jang Hyun	
March	Hins Cheung	Hong Jang Hyun	
March	Tyson Yoshi	Hong Jang Hyun	
March	Terence Lam	Hong Jang Hyun	
March	Jeffrey Ngai	Hong Jang Hyun	
March	Hung Kaho	Hong Jang Hyun	
April	Lulu Tenney; América González; Felice Nova Noordhoff	Felix Cooper	
May	Tilda Swinton	Harit Srikhao	
June	Jisoo	Park Jong Ha	
July	Park Shin-hye	Kim Yeong-jun	
August	Daniel Lee; Karen Elson; Vachirawit Chivaaree	Brianna Capozzi	
September	Anya Taylor-Joy	Norman Jean Roy	
October	He Cong	Jumbo Tsui	
November	Penélope Cruz	Luigi & Iango	
December	Ella Yam	Jumbo Tsui	
December	CL	Go Won Tae	
December	Eileen Gu	Nick Yang	
December	Jourdan Dunn	Brendan Freeman	
December	Kōki	Kizen Zhao	

=== 2025 ===
Issue	Cover model	Photographer
January	Liu Shishi	Jumbo Tsui
February	Emma Chamberlain	Emmie America
March	Song Hye-kyo	Hong Jang Hyun
April	Soo Joo Park	Luigi & Iango
May	Sakura Ando	Leung Mo
June	XG	Oscar Chik
July	Kim Doyeon	Hong Janghyun
August	Emily Blunt	Domen + Van De Velde
September	Cathy Chui Lee	Yeongjun Kim
October	Naomi Campbell	Luigi & Iango
November	Elle Fanning	Norman Jean Roy
December	Freen Sarocha, Rebecca Patricia Armstrong	BJ Pasqual

=== 2026 ===
Issue	Cover model	Photographer
January	Yang Zi	Leslie Zhang
February	Maya Hawke	Greg Swales
March	Babymonster	Kim Sin Ae
April	Louise Wong	Karl Lam
May	Lina Zhang	Davit Giorgadze
June	Laufey	Liu Song
July	Gemma Chan	Emma Summerton
August	Monica Barbaro	Norman Jean Roy
September	Greta Lee	Shaniqwa Jarvis
October	Yuqi	Liu Song
November	Eileen Gu	Alex Huanfa Cheng
