= List of Teen Vogue cover models =

This list of Teen Vogue cover models (2000–present) is a catalog of cover models who have appeared on the cover Teen Vogue, the teen version of American fashion magazine Vogue. Since 2018 the magazine has been digital-only.

== 2000s ==
=== 2000 ===
Issue	Cover model	Photographer
Fall	Jessica Simpson, Nick Lachey	

=== 2001 ===
Issue	Cover model	Photographer
Fall	Seann William Scott, Tara Reid	

=== 2002 ===
Issue	Cover model	Photographer
Spring	Jaime King & Hayden Christensen	

=== 2003 ===
Issue	Cover model	Photographer
February/March	Gwen Stefani	
April/May	Ashanti	
October/November	Jake Gyllenhaal & Alison Lohman	
December/January 2004	Katie Holmes	

=== 2004 ===
Issue	Cover model	Photographer
February	Beyoncé	
March	Julia Stiles	
April	Romola Garai & Diego Luna	
May	Mandy Moore	
June/July	Mischa Barton	
August	Anne Hathaway	
September	Adam Brody & Alexis Bledel	
October	Kirsten Dunst	
November	Avril Lavigne & Usher	
December/January 2005	Hilary Duff	

=== 2005 ===
Issue	Cover model	Photographer
February	Scarlett Johansson & Topher Grace	
March	Emmy Rossum	
April	Rachel Bilson	
May	Elisha Cuthbert & Chad Michael Murray	
June/July	Lindsay Lohan	
August	Evan Rachel Wood	
September	Nicole Richie	
October	Orlando Bloom	
November	Emma Watson	
December/January 2006	Joy Bryant	

=== 2006 ===
Issue	Cover model	Photographer
February	Gemma Ward	
March	Camilla Belle	
April	Ciara	
May	Mandy Moore	
June/July	Lauren Conrad	
August	Kate Bosworth	
September	Mischa Barton	
October	Rachel Bilson	
November	Kirsten Dunst	
December/January 2007	Mary-Kate and Ashley Olsen (double cover)	

=== 2007 ===
Issue	Cover model	Photographer
February	Maria Sharapova	
March	Kristen Stewart	
April	Willa Holland	
May	Emma Roberts	
June/July	Daniel Radcliffe & Emma Watson	
August	Whitney Port & Lauren Conrad	
September	Anne Hathaway	
October	Mischa Barton	
November	Rihanna	
December/January 2008	Natalie Portman	

=== 2008 ===
Issue	Cover model	Photographer
February	Karlie Kloss, Chanel Iman & Ali Michael	
March	Blake Lively	
April	Camilla Belle	
May	Elliot Page (Note: Credited as Ellen Page)	
June/July	Hayden Panettiere	
August	Amanda Seyfried	
September	Vanessa Hudgens	
October	Zac Efron	
November	Rachel Bilson	
December/January 2009	Kristen Stewart	

=== 2009 ===
Issue	Cover model	Photographer
February	Leighton Meester	
March	Taylor Swift	
April	Emma Roberts	
May	Miley Cyrus	
June/July	Selena Gomez	
August	Emma Watson	
September	Taylor Momsen	
October	Taylor Lautner	
November	Chanel Iman & Jourdan Dunn	
December/January 2010	Dakota Fanning	

== 2010s ==
=== 2010 ===
Issue	Cover model	Photographer
February	Jessica Szohr	Patrick Demarchelier
March	Mia Wasikowska	Norman Jean Roy
April	Miley Cyrus	Patrick Demarchelier
May	Karlie Kloss	Patrick Demarchelier
June/July	Amanda Seyfried	Patrick Demarchelier
August	Demi Lovato & Joe Jonas	Norman Jean Roy
September	Victoria Justice	Norman Jean Roy
October	Justin Bieber	Alasdair McLellan
November	Lauren Conrad	Norman Jean Roy
December/January 2011	Cory Monteith & Lea Michele	Regan Cameron

=== 2011 ===
Issue	Cover model	Photographer
February	Lucy Hale	Patrick Demarchelier
March	Ashley Greene	Patrick Demarchelier
April	Nina Dobrev	Regan Cameron
May	Jennifer Lawrence	Patrick Demarchelier
June/July	Selena Gomez	Patrick Demarchelier
August	Taylor Swift	Daniel Jackson
September	Emma Stone	Daniel Jackson
October	Lily Collins	Paola Kudacki
November	Alexa Chung	Paola Kudacki
December/January 2012	Chloë Grace Moretz	Paola Kudacki

=== 2012 ===
Issue	Cover model	Photographer
February	Elle Fanning	Sebastian Kim
March	Kendall & Kylie Jenner	Regan Cameron
April	Ashley Benson	Jason Kibbler
May	Katy Perry	Sebastian Kim
June/July	Miranda Cosgrove	Jason Kibbler
August	Andrew Garfield & Emma Stone	Josh Olins
September	Selena Gomez	Boo George
October	Victoria Justice	Sebastian Kim
November	Demi Lovato	Jason Kibbler
December/January 2013	One Direction	Boo George

=== 2013 ===
Issue	Cover model	Photographer
February	AnnaSophia Robb	Jason Kibbler
March	Chloë Grace Moretz	Boo George
April	Shay Mitchell	Sebastian Kim
May	Justin Bieber	Boo George
June/July	Nicki Minaj	Sebastian Kim
August	Emma Watson	Boo George
September	One Direction	Peggy Sirota
October	Hailee Steinfeld	Sebastian Kim
November	Demi Lovato	Giampaolo Sgura
December/January 2014	Selena Gomez	Giampaolo Sgura

=== 2014 ===
Issue	Cover model	Photographer
February	Ariana Grande	Sebastian Kim
March	Lea Michele	Giampaolo Sgura
April	Shailene Woodley	Boo George
May	Lorde	Gregory Harris
June/July	Elle Fanning	Daniel Jackson
August	Kesha	Giampaolo Sgura
September	Kendall Jenner	Emma Summerton
October	Chloë Grace Moretz	Kacper Kasprzyk
November	Rita Ora	Giampaolo Sgura
December/January 2015	Austin Mahone	Boo George

=== 2015 ===
Issue	Cover model	Photographer
February	Zendaya	Boo George
March	Binx Walton & Gigi Hadid	Daniel Jackson
April	Bella Thorne	Emma Summerton
May	Kylie Jenner	Giampaolo Sgura
June/July	Nat Wolff & Charli XCX	Scott Trindle
August	Aya Jones; Imaan Hammam; Lineisy Montero	Daniel Jackson
September	Ansel Elgort	Boo George
October	Elle Fanning	Christian Macdonald
November	Emma Roberts	Matteo Montanari
December/January 2016	Fernanda Ly	Daniel Jackson

=== 2016 ===
Issue	Cover model	Photographer
February	Amandla Stenberg	Ben Toms
March	Zoë Kravitz	Josh Olins
April	Grimes	Ben Toms
May	Willow Smith	Emma Summerton
June/July	Cameron Dallas & Anwar Hadid	Coco Capitán
August	Gabby Douglas; Simone Biles	Jason Kibbler
September	Tavi Gevinson	Inez & Vinoodh
October/November	Chloë Grace Moretz & Brooklyn Beckham	Bruce Weber
December	Rowan Blanchard & Yara Shahidi	Sean Thomas

=== 2017 ===
Issue	Cover model	Photographer
Volume 1	Jesse Jo Stark & Bella Hadid	Daniel Jackson
Volume 1	Sasha Lane	Amy Troost
Volume 1	Troye Sivan	Ryan McGinley
Volume 2	Chance the Rapper	Petra Collins
Volume 2	Paris Jackson	Hedi Slimane
Volume 2	Solange	Ryan McGinley
Volume 3	Amandla Stenberg	Josh Olins
Volume 3	Kaia Gerber	Collier Schorr
Volume 3	Millie Bobby Brown	Oliver Hadlee Pearch
Volume 4	Hillary Clinton	Quentin Jones

=== 2018 ===
In March 2018, Teen Vogue, after the shuttering of its print edition, began publishing "digital covers."

Issue	Cover model	Photographer
Young Hollywood	Sasha Lane, Letitia Wright, Ellie Bamber, Margaret Qualley, Laura Harrier, Awkwafina, Bria Vinaite, & Storm Reid	Camila Falquez
March	Gun violence activists: Clifton Kinnie, Nick Joseph, X González, Jaclyn Corin, Sarah Chadwick, Jazmine Wildcat, Kenidra Woods, Nza-Ari Khepra & Natalie Barden	Tyler Mitchell
April	Dua Lipa	Santiago & Mauricio
May	Ja'Mal Green, Kat Kerwin & Hadiya Afzal	Katie McCurdy
June	Billie Eilish, Chloe x Halle, Haim, Lizzo, Bebe Rexha, Grace VanderWaal & Charli XCX	Campbell Addy
July	Halima Aden	Scandebergs
September	Chelsea Warner, Jillian Mercado & Mama Cax	Camila Falquez
October	Lili Reinhart	Matthew Sprout
December/January 2019	Serena Williams	Ronan Mckenzie

=== 2019 ===
Issue	Cover model	Photographer
Young Hollywood	Danielle Macdonald, Yalitza Aparicio, Jaboukie Young-White, Joey King, Indya Moore, Jharrel Jerome, & Florence Pugh	Nacho Alegre
March/April	Marsai Martin & Nico Parker	Bec Parsons
May	Camila Mendes	Wai Lin Tse
June	Lil Nas X & Maggie Rogers	Camila Falquez & Peter Ash Lee
July/August	Millie Bobby Brown	Ronan McKenzie
Special Issue	Coco Gauff	Camila Falquez
September	Naomi Scott	Juliette Cassidy
October	Beanie Fedstein	Jaqueline Harriet
November	Zara Larsson	Yu Tsai
December	Chika	Kelia Anne

== 2020s ==
=== 2020 ===
Issue	Cover model	Photographer
Young Hollywood	Jacob Batalon, Kelvin Harrison Jr., Sofia Carson, Millicent Simmonds, Liza Koshy, Ncuti Gatwa, Dafne Keen, Theo Germaine, & Kaitlyn Dever	Ruth Ossai
January	Lana Condor	Daria Kobyashi Ritch
March	Tierra Whack	Camila Falquez
April	Issa Rae	Yu Tsai
May	Kehlani	Emman Montalvan
July	Tomorrow X Together	Park Jawook
August	Suffragettes: Raquel Willis, Jessica Marie Garcia, Aliana Margarita Bigio Alcoba, Leah Lewis, Tiniesha Johnson, Ayanna Pressley, Charitie Ropati, Yara Shahidi, Shahana Hanif, & Thandiwe Abdullah	Tory Rust & Kai Byrd
September	Jari Jones & Munroe Bergdorf	Quil Lemons & The Masons
October	Normani	Micaiah Carter
November	Ilhan Omar & Isra Hirsi	Ryan Pfluger

=== 2021 ===
Issue	Cover model	Photographer
Young Hollywood	Charli D'Amelio, Michael Le, Ziwe Fumudoh, Elsa Majimbo, & Lil Yachty	Grace Rivera
January	Cori Bush	Joe Martinez
April	CNCO	Alexander Saladrigas
May	Justice Smith	Emman Montalvan
June	Saweetie	Shaniqwa Jarvis
July	Bretman Rock	Emman Montalvan
August	Maitreyi Ramakrishnan	Heather Sten
September	Natalia Bryant	Raven B. Varona
October	Olivia Rodrigo	Josefina Santos
November	Jaden Michael & Saniyya Sidney	Andy Jackson

=== 2022 ===
Issue	Cover model	Photographer
New Hollywood	Sydney Sweeney, Morgan Cooper, Caleb McLaughlin, Devery Jacobs, Patti Harrison, Karena Evans, Xolo Maridueña, & Nik Dodani	Amy Harrity
Special Issue	Cast of "Bel-Air": Coco Jones, Olly Sholotan, Akira Akbar, & Jabari Banks	Erik Carter
April	Charithra Chandra	Allyssa Hueze
May	Yumi Nu & Natalie Nootenboom	Peter Ash Lee
July/August	Cast of "Pretty Little Liars: Original Sin": Maia Reficco, Bailee Madison, Chandler Kinne, Zaria, & Malia Pyles	Izack Morales
September	Becky G	Josefina Santos
October/November	Phoebe Bridgers	Chloe Horseman
Special Issue	Wisdom Kaye	Myles Loftin

=== 2023 ===
Issue	Cover model	Photographer
New Hollywood	Isabela Merced, Yasmin Finney, Dominique Thorne, Amber Midthunder, Amrit Kaur, Myha'la Herrold, Ruth Codd, Keyla Monterroso Mejia and Park Ji-hu	Jingyu Lin
Special Issue	Iris Apatow	Lenne Chai
May	Anna Cathcart	Louisiana Mei Gelpi
June	Ice Spice	Chinazam Ojukwu
July	Ayra Starr	Stephen Tayo
August	Joe Locke and Kit Connor	Anglais Field
September	Aoki Lee Simmons	Whitney Hayes
November/December	Coco Jones	Chinazam

=== 2024 ===
Issue	Cover model	Photographer
February	Keke Palmer	Andy Jackson
New Hollywood	Christopher Briney, Ariana Greenblatt, Maddie Ziegler, Iñaki Godoy, Aida Osman, Megan Suri, Keith Powers	Josefina Santos
April	Nicola Coughlan	Deirdre Lewis
May/June	Twice	Lai Frances
July/August	Jordan Chiles	Erica Devin Snyder
September	Demi Lovato	Josefina Santos
October	Alex Consani	Angalis Field

=== 2025 ===
Issue	Cover model	Photographer
Special Issue (March)	Vivian Wilson	Andy Jackson
April	Sadie Sink	Beth Garrabrant
Unnumbered (June)	Katseye	Bea Oyster
Unnumbered (July)	Lola Tung	Elinor Kry
September/October	Flau'jae Johnson	Kendall Bessent
New Hollywood (November)	Leah Sava Jeffries, Mckenna Grace, Mason Thames	Angalis Field

=== 2026 ===
Issue	Cover model	Photographer
January/February	Grace Van Patten, Jackson White	Andy Jackson
Unnumbered (March)	Alysa Liu	Urka Long
March	Charithra Chandran, Iñaki Godoy	Aart Verrips
August	Adéla	Jaša Müller
September	Evan	Julian Song
November	Anok Yai	Elizaveta Porodina
