= Yoon Young Bae =

South Korean model (born 1998)

- 배윤영
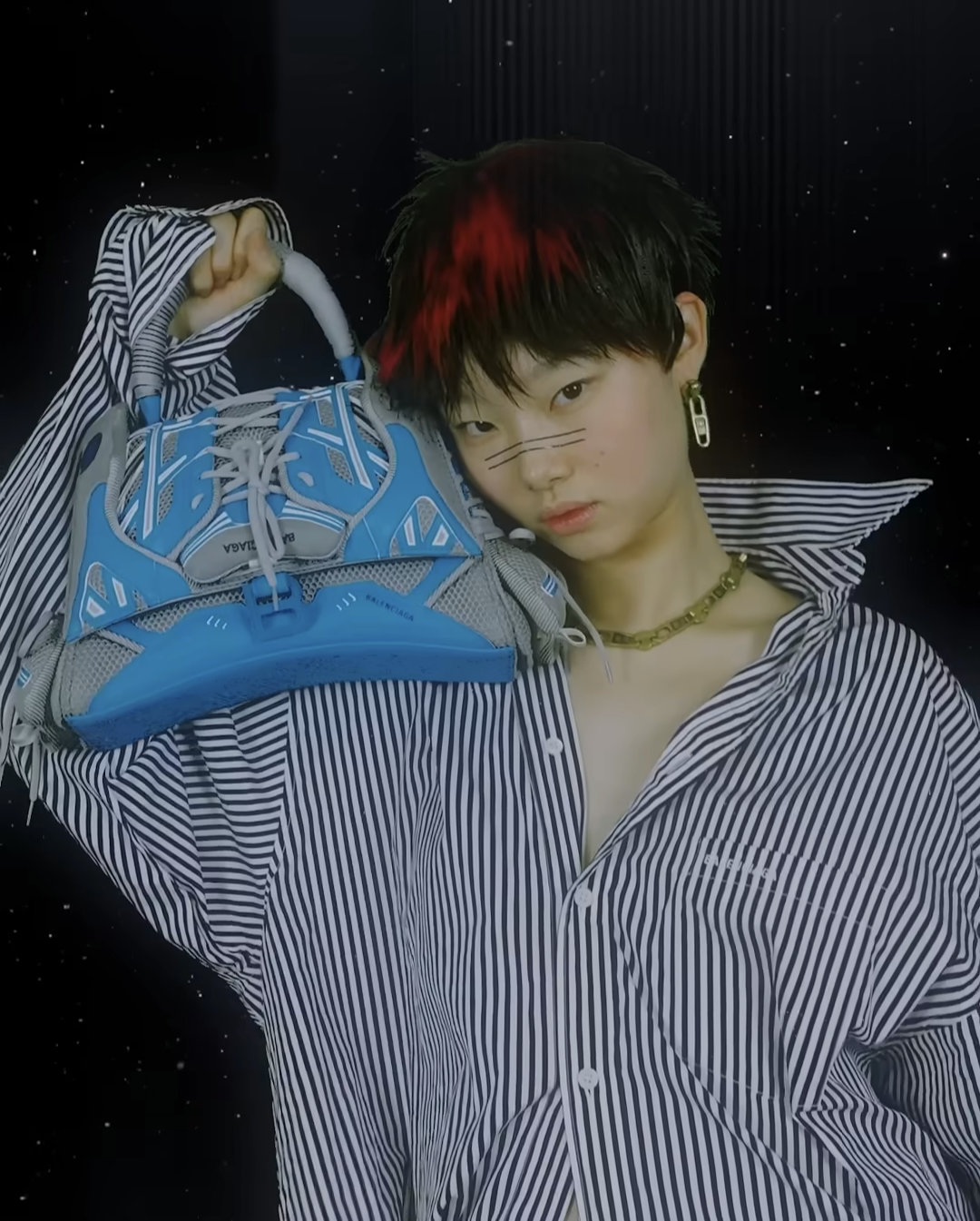
- Bae for the 2021 Balenciaga Fall campaign
- Born: May 9, 1998 (age 28); Daegu, South Korea
- Modeling information
- Height: 5 ft 10 in (1.78 m)
- Hair color: Black
- Eye color: Brown
- Agency: The Society Management (New York); Elite Model Management (worldwide); YGKPLUS (Seoul) (mother agency)

Yoon Young Bae (Korean: 배윤영; born May 9, 1998) is a South Korean fashion model. She appeared on the "New Frontiers" cover of British Vogue, alongside Vittoria Ceretti, Halima Aden, Faretta, Adut Akech, Paloma Elsesser, Radhika Nair, Fran Summers, and Selena Forrest.

== Career ==
Bae is a native of Daegu, South Korea. She was discovered by a Korean stylist who introduced her to the modeling agency YGKPlus. She debuted as a Prada exclusive in 2016, including advertisements; in her second season she walked for Chloé, Kenzo, Loewe, and Christian Dior among others. According to The Fashion Spot, for the spring 2019 season, Bae tied with Dutch model Kiki Willems for having the most bookings.

She has also walked for Chanel, Fenty x Puma, Céline, Valentino, Paco Rabanne, Marni, Versace, Moschino, Fendi, Christopher Kane, Burberry, J.W. Anderson, Coach New York, Michael Kors, Altuzarra, Victoria Beckham, and Tommy Hilfiger. Bae appeared in a Diane von Fürstenberg campaign (alongside Luna Bijl, Angok Mayen, and Cara Taylor) as well as campaigns for Zara, Prabal Gurung, Tory Burch, and Chanel.

As of April 2020, Bae ranks as a "Top 50" model on models.com. British Vogue's Rosie Vogel-Eades chose her as one of the top models of A/W 2018 fashion week.
