= Paloma Elsesser =

American fashion model (born 1992)

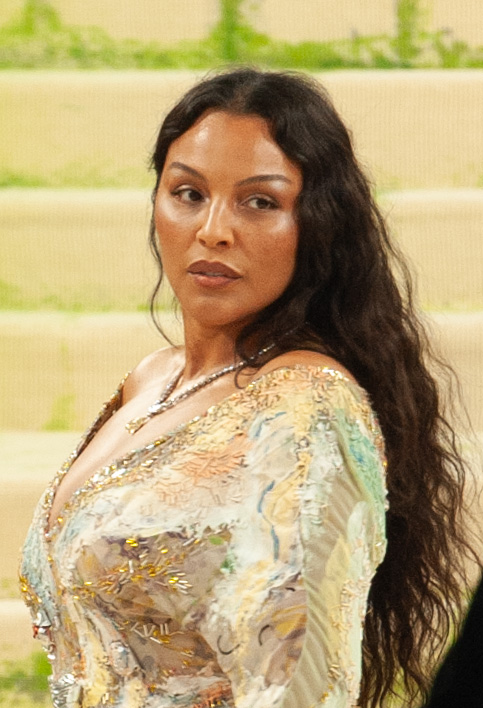
- Elsesser at the 2026 Met Gala
- Born: Paloma Kai Shockley Elsesser; April 12, 1992 (age 34); London Borough of Camden, England, UK
- Occupation: Model
- Years active: 2014–present
- Relatives: Sage Elsesser (brother)
- Modeling information
- Height: 5 ft 6 in (1.68 m)
- Hair color: Black
- Eye color: Brown
- Agency: IMG Models (New York, Paris, Milan, London, Sydney)

Paloma Kai Shockley Elsesser (born April 12, 1992) is an American model. In 2023, she was the first plus-size model to win Fashion Awards for Model of the Year. She also walked for Victoria's Secret Fashion Show in late 2024.

== Early life ==
Elsesser was born in London, England to an African-American mother and a father of Chilean and Swiss descent. She was raised in Los Angeles, California and moved to New York City, New York in 2010, to attend The New School to study psychology and literature. She has two sisters: her elder sister Kanyessa McMahon is a director and producer, her younger sister, Ama, is also an actor and model signed to IMG, while her brother, Sage Elsesser, is a rapper and professional skateboarder.

== Career ==
Elsesser was discovered on Instagram by makeup artist Pat McGrath.

She has modeled for Nike, Fenty Beauty, Victoria's Secret, Proenza Schouler, and Mercedes-Benz. She has appeared in editorials for fashion magazines such as American Vogue, Vogue España, Teen Vogue, Elle, W, Wonderland Magazine, and Glamour.

In 2018, Elsesser appeared on the cover of British Vogue's April issue with Fran Summers, Radhika Nair, Adut Akech, Faretta, Selena Forrest, Halima Aden, Vittoria Ceretti, and Yoon Young Bae. In 2019, Elsesser made her screen acting debut in the Safdie brothers' Uncut Gems.

Elsesser appeared on the cover of American Vogue's January 2021 issue, and on the cover of Vogue Adria's April 2025 issue.

== Awards ==
Year	Association	Category	Nominated works	Result	Ref.
2023	Fashion Awards	Model of the Year	Herself	Won	
2023	Latin American Fashion Awards	Model of the Year	Herself	Won	

== Filmography ==
Music videos
Year	Title	Artist	Role	Note
2025	Gorgeous	Doja Cat	Herself	
