= Mika Schneider =

French model (born 2001)

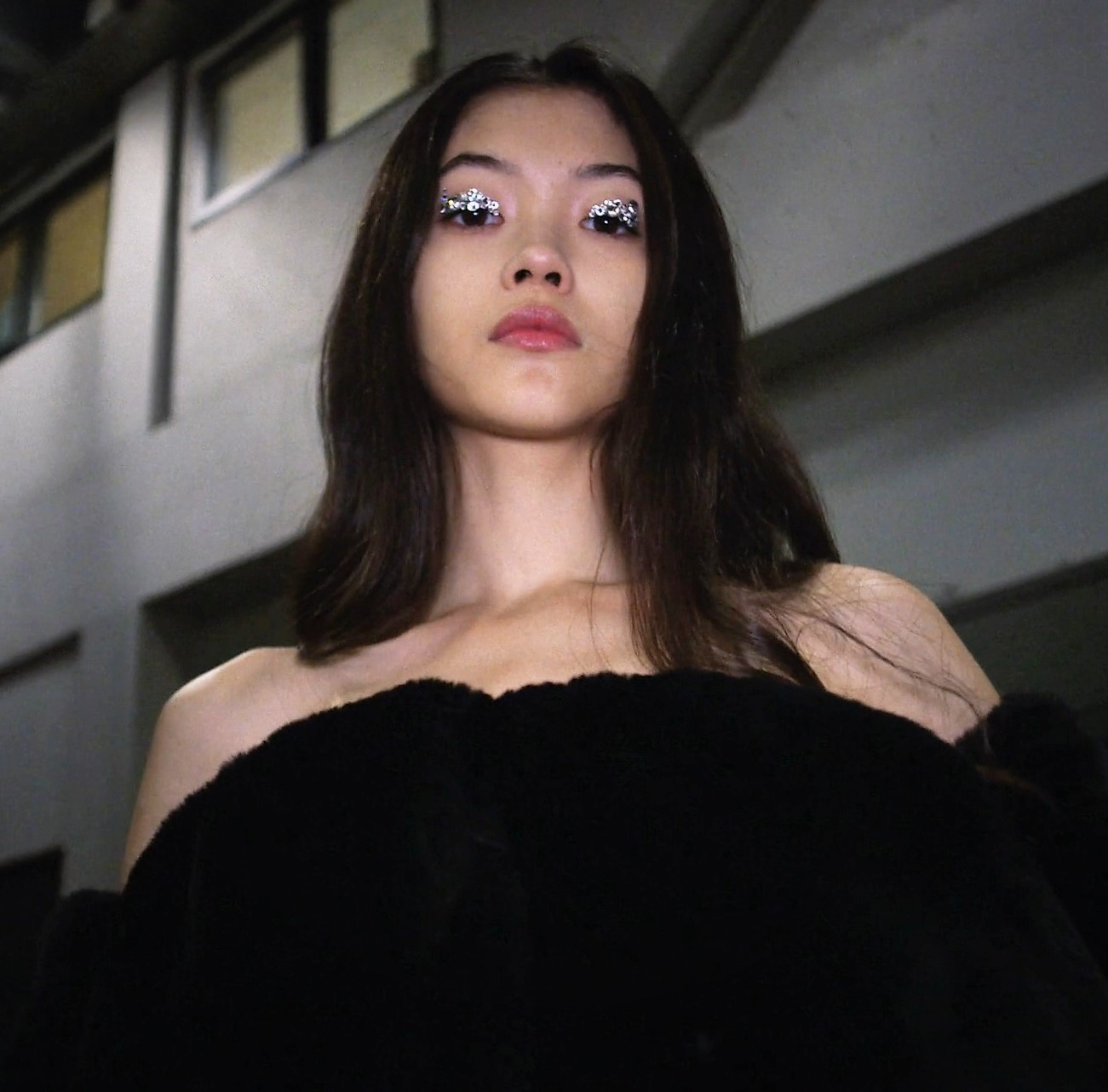
- Schneider modeling Coperni in 2021
- Born: 30 August 2001 (age 24); Paris, France
- Modelling information
- Height: 5 ft 10 in (1.78 m)
- Hair colour: Black
- Eye colour: Dark Brown
- Agency: The Society Management (New York); Elite Model Management (Paris, Milan, London, Barcelona, Copenhagen); Bon Image Corp. (Tokyo) (mother agency)

Mika Schneider (born 30 August 2001) is a French model. She appeared on a cover of American Vogue in April 2020. Models.com currently ranks her as one of the Top 50 models.

== Early life ==
Schneider was born in Paris, France, to a French father and Japanese mother. Schneider moved frequently between France and Japan as well as living in Moscow, Russia, and Chennai, India; she speaks French, Japanese, English, and additionally some Russian and German.

== Career ==
While living in India, Schneider's mother sent photos of her to Japanese modeling agency Bon Image, while Elite Model Management's French division scouted her through Instagram.

Schneider debuted at Prada's S/S 2020 fashion show and modeled as the bride (Note: In fashion, the bride is the model who appears last in the show wearing the most extravagant gown in the collection, though it is not always a bridal gown.) in Tom Ford's Los Angeles fashion show. In 2021, she had walked in over 30 shows, more shows than any model during Fashion Week, including Chanel, Saint Laurent, Miu Miu, Dior, Prada, Versace, Fendi, Tom Ford, and Louis Vuitton. She appeared on two group covers of Vogue Japan, (Note: One cover was alongside, while the other was alongside models Abby Champion, Bente Oort, Shanelle Nyasiase, and Hannah Motler. The other was alongside models Jill Kortleve, Binx Walton, Valerie Scherzinger, and Belgian rapper Shay.) who called her a "rising star". She also appeared on the cover of i-D with Italian model Maty Fall. She appeared on the cover of the February 2022 issue of Vogue France. In advertisements, she has appeared in campaigns for Chanel, Moncler, Zara, Loewe, Givenchy, Valentino, Saint Laurent, Versace, and Hermès.

Schneider was the readers' choice for "Breakout Star of the Year" for the 2020 Model of the Year Awards on models.com. In 2022, she was chosen as one of The Next Icons by Harper's Bazaar.
