= Fran Summers =

British fashion model (born 1999)

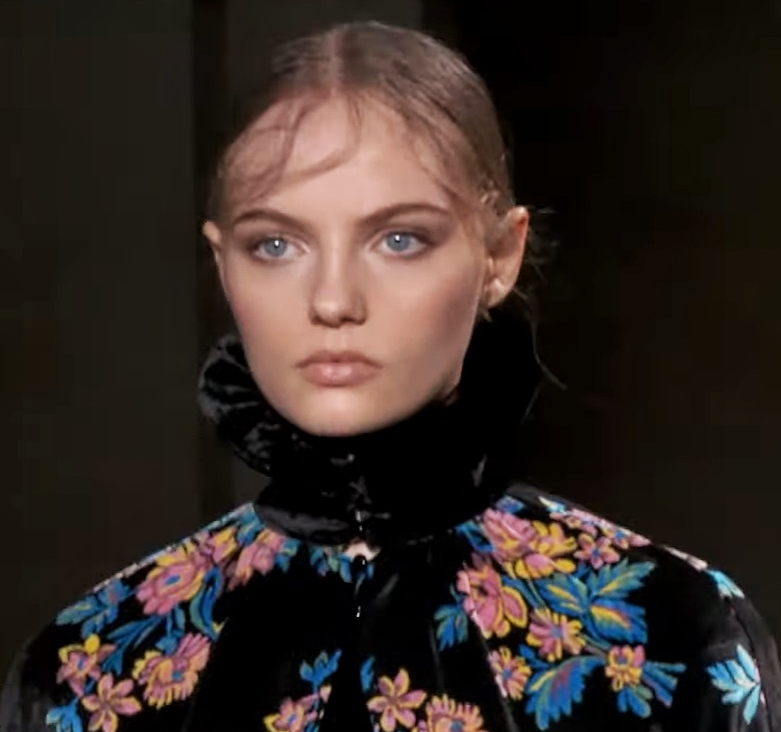
- Summers in 2020
- Born: Francesca Summers; 12 August 1999 (age 27); Richmond, North Yorkshire, England
- Citizenship: United Kingdom
- Occupation: Fashion model
- Years active: 2016–present
- Modelling information
- Height: 1.78 m (5 ft 10 in)
- Hair colour: Brown
- Eye colour: Blue
- Agency: The Society Management (New York); Ford Models (Paris); The Hive (London); Elite Model Management (Milan)

Francesca Summers is a British fashion model. Discovered at 15 at a MAC Cosmetics store in London, she was signed by Storm Management and made her runway debut at Christopher Kane in 2016; the following year she was an exclusive for Prada. She has appeared on the covers of British Vogue, Vogue Italia, Vogue Japan, and American Vogue. In 2020 she became a face of Givenchy Parfums and Burberry Beauty.

== Early life ==
Summers was born in Richmond, North Yorkshire, England, to Keith and Sandra Summers, who own a carpet and flooring business; she has an older sister named Danielle and a brother named Lucas. She was scouted at 15 while visiting her sister in London, when a make-up artist at a MAC Cosmetics store in Westfield London asked if she had ever considered modelling. The artist took Summers and her sister to Storm Management on her next day off, and the agency offered her a contract on the spot.

== Career ==
"Sometimes, when I'm overwhelmed, I have to be quiet: process any stress internally and just take a deep breath. Sometimes, people come up to me on shoots and they're like, "Are you alright? You're really quiet." I'm like, "I'm just having a moment, just regenerating," because when I do speak I want to be positive. I love this job, but doing photoshoots it does take energy to make those photos, because you are creating art a lot of the time. You have to be that character. I think giving out too much exhausts you. You have to find the right way to keep your focus."

— Fran Summers, British Vogue

Summers made her runway debut at Christopher Kane's Spring/Summer 2017 show in 2016. For the Spring/Summer 2018 season she was first spotted at J.W. Anderson's London show, walked as an exclusive for Prada in Milan, and appeared for Saint Laurent, Loewe, Céline, Miu Miu, and Louis Vuitton in Paris. She went on to walk for Chloé, Valentino, Fendi, Chanel, Dior, and Givenchy, including the 2018 haute couture shows. She has said that watching shows like Ugly Betty and America's Next Top Model gave her a negative impression of the fashion industry and initially discouraged her from pursuing modelling.

She appeared on her first Vogue cover for the January 2018 issue of Vogue Italia, photographed by Craig McDean. She was on the cover of the May 2018 issue of British Vogue as part of a portfolio of new models, and that July she opened the Valentino fall 2018 couture show in Paris. Clare Waight Keller cast her in the finale look of the fall 2018 Givenchy couture show, a dress inspired by Audrey Hepburn. Her second British Vogue cover, for the November 2018 issue, was photographed by Inez and Vinoodh in Times Square. She also appeared in 2018 campaigns for Prada, Chloé, and Versace.

In 2019 she was the cover star of the March issue of WSJ. Magazine, and one of the models on the covers of the September 2019 issue of Vogue Japan, photographed by Luigi & Iango. In May 2019 she attended her first Met Gala as a guest of Burberry's Riccardo Tisci, wearing a custom black silk dress by Tisci. She walked in some 70 shows that year, with closing appearances for Burberry, Etro, Matty Bovan, and Valentino, and was included in the Business of Fashion's annual BoF 500 index of people shaping the fashion industry.

In February 2020, Givenchy Parfums named Summers the face of a forthcoming women's fragrance. She was one of 30 models photographed by Tyler Mitchell for the April 2020 issue of American Vogue, a portfolio representing 25 international editions of the magazine. Later that year she became the face of Burberry Beauty and starred in the campaign for the brand's Her fragrance, photographed by Mario Sorrenti.

In 2021, having moved to Innsbruck, Austria, during the COVID-19 pandemic, she appeared on the cover of the Autumn 2021 issue of i-D. In 2026 she appeared on the covers of novembre magazine and Harper's Bazaar Korea.
