= Miki Ehara =

Japanese model

- 江原美希
- Born: 1995 (age 30–31)
- Occupation: Model
- Years active: 2016–present
- Employer: Donna Models

Miki Ehara (江原美希, Ehara Miki; born 1995) is a Japanese model. As part of the modeling agency Donna, she has modeled for Louis Vuitton, Fendi, Hermès, and Dior, among others. She has also appeared in commercial advertisements.

Marie Claire called Ehara a need-to-know Japanese model, and South China Morning Post named her as part of "a new generation of Japanese models... going against the flow."

== Career ==
Before her modeling career, Ehara worked a part-time job in a shopping center, during which a photographer approached her. She then made her debut as a model by appearing on the December 12, 2016 cover of WWD Japan. Two months later, at the age of 21, she walked for Louis Vuitton's F/W 2017 collection show, as well as a Tae Ashida show for the same season.

In 2019, Ehara made her Paris Fashion Week debut. She also appeared on the May 2019 cover of Vogue Japan with UTA, photographed by Giampaolo Sgura, and walked in several fashion shows during F/W 2019 for Dior, Lacoste, and Lanvin. On November 25, Shiseido's leading hair and makeup artist Kera Hirofumi published Kerareation, a practical guide to hairstyling, which featured photographs of Ehara, among other models.
