= Elsesser =

Elsesser is a surname. Notable people with the surname include:

- Paloma Elsesser (born 1992), American fashion model
- Sage Elsesser (born 1997), American skateboarder and rapper
