= Leon Dame =

German model (born 1999)

- Born: March 11, 1999 (age 27); Berlin, Germany
- Education: Free University of Berlin
- Occupation: Model
- Years active: 2015 - present
- Modeling information
- Hair color: Dirty blonde
- Eye color: Brown

Leon Dame (born 11 March 1999 (Note: Dame was 16 years old in 2015.)) is a German model born in Berlin. He is known for his unique walk, androgynous fashion style, and appearance at Maison Margiela’s 2020 show, which went viral on social media.

== Career ==
=== Early career ===
Leon Dame, who grew up in Berlin, says he was discovered as a model while waiting for the bus on his way home. He ran his first major show in Paris in 2015 for the Japanese fashion label Sacai. The New York Times listed Leon Dame as one of eight young male models "to watch at this season's New York Fashion Week" in 2016. At the age of 17 he ran for Alexander McQueen, Jil Sander, and Gucci, among others. Parallel to his modelling career, he studied theatre and political science at the Free University of Berlin.

He has been working for Maison Margiela since 2018. In September 2018, he walked the runway at John Galliano's Mutiny show in a sherbet green negligee, doll shoes, and a bathing cap. In February 2019, Leon Dame appeared in brightly painted leggings and a bolero.

=== Spring/Summer 2020 Show ===
Leon Dame became internationally known with the final appearance of the spring/summer 2020 show by Maison Margiela in the Paris Grand Palais in autumn 2019 at Paris Fashion Week, where he wore knee-high leather high heels and a sailor jacket, under which his white hot pants were seen. The performance was staged by the controversial creative director of the fashion label, John Galliano. Vogue described his performance as a combination of "angelic child and outrageous confidence" with which Leon Dame "flooded social media." The performance was even characterized on Twitter as that of a "brazen baby giraffe just leaving a club."

His appearance, which was also positively received by Vogue Editor-in-Chief Anna Wintour, went viral and received over 1.6 million views on Facebook.

=== 2020 - present ===
In January 2020, Leon Dame once again starred in the Maison Margiela runway show when he wore a belted jacket and a red "bowler hat" to present the Spring 2020 Haute Couture collection.

During the COVID-19 pandemic, he appeared on the #ValentinoEmpathy project, which raised funds to support a hospital in Rome. For this campaign, the models were photographed at home presenting the fall and winter collection.

In June 2021 he was interviewed by German Vogue about body image, society and beauty.

In January 2023, Loro Piana unveiled its spring summer 2023 campaign, starring Leon Dame alongside other models such as Rianne Van Rompaey and Mika Schneider. Leon Dame was the only male featured on the campaign.

Leon Dame is also a saxophonist and currently attends the Royal Academy of Dramatic Art in London, taking acting courses.

Leon Dame opens the new Maison Margiela Haute Couture Spring Summer 2024 show "Artisanal" by Designer John Galliano.

== Awards ==
He was voted Breakout Star Men in 2019, and was nominated for Model of the Year Men in 2020 and 2021.

== See also ==
- Maison Margiela
