= Anouck Lepère =

Belgian model (born 1979)

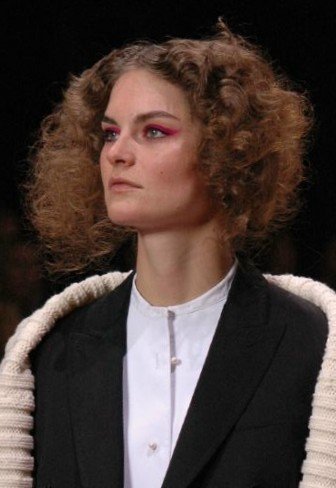
- Anouck Lepère at Paul Smith Women Fall 2007 fashion show, London Fashion Week
- Born: Anouck Lepère; 13 February 1979 (age 47); Antwerp, Belgium
- Modeling information
- Height: 1.74 m (5 ft 8 1/2 in)
- Hair color: brown
- Eye color: blue
- Agency: IMG Models (Paris, London); Dominique Models (Brussels); Modelwerk (Hamburg)

Anouck Lepère (born 13 February 1979 in Antwerp, Flanders) is a Belgian model.

Lepère was studying architecture in Antwerp, when she was persuaded by her friends Dries van Noten and Olivier Theyskens to try modelling. She first appeared on the runways in Paris in 2000 and is currently signed with IMG Models. She also worked as a model for Delvaux and the Hugo Boss "Woman" and "Deep Red" perfumes, and with Steven Meisel, Mario Testino, Inez van Lamsweerde and Vinoodh Matadin. Lepere was on the covers of Vogue, Harper's Bazaar, Marie Claire, and French Playboy. She has her own line of jewellery.
