= Izumi Mori =

Japanese model and tarento

- 森 泉
- Born: October 18, 1982 (age 43); Minato, Tokyo, Japan
- Other names: Izumi-chan (泉ちゃん); Izmir (イズミール, Izumīru)
- Education: Keio Elementary School; Keio Chutobu Junior High School; The Putney School
- Occupations: Model, tarento
- Years active: 2002–
- Agent: Walk Zero
- Height: 1.73 m (5 ft 8 in)
- Relatives: Ken Mori (grandfather); Hanae Mori (grandmother); Akira Mori (father); Pamela Mori (Pamela Ann Harris) (mother); Ken Mori (brother); Ben Mori (brother); Yuki Mori (sister); Hikari Mori (sister)

Izumi Mori (森 泉, Mori Izumi; born October 18, 1982, in Minato, Tokyo, Japan) is a Japanese model and tarento represented by Walk Zero. Her father is Japanese, while her mother is Italian-American.

== Filmography ==
=== Magazines ===
Title	Notes
Miss	
25ans	
ef	
CanCam	

=== TV series ===
Current appearances

Year	Title	Network	Notes
	Oshareism	NTV	Moderator
	Yume! Dōbutsu Daizukan	TBS	
	Shiawase! Bonbi Girl	NTV	
2014	High Noon TV Viking!	Fuji TV	Wednesday appearances

Former appearances

Title	Network	Notes
Pooh!	TBS	
Omoikkiriī!! TV	NTV	Tuesday appearances
Omoikkiri Don!	NTV	Tuesday appearances
GuruGuru Ninety-Nine	NTV	
Don!	NTV	Tuesday appearances
Sekai no Mura de Hakken! Konna Tokoro ni Nihon-jin	TV Asahi	Panelist

=== Dramas ===
Year	Title	Role	Network	Notes	Ref.
2006	59-banme no Propose	Aya Koizumi	NTV		

=== Films ===
Year	Title	Role	Notes
2008	Happy Darts	Satomi Hachioji	

=== Music videos ===
Title	Notes
Jazztronik "Love Tribe"	

=== Advertisements ===
Year	Title	Notes
	Shiseido Tsubaki	
	Meiji Dairies Vaam	
	Mikimoto	
	Suzuki Chevrolet Cruze and Chevrolet MW	
	Pizza-La	
2007	Sapporo Ocean Spray Cranberry	
2008	Sony Vaio	
2008	Cathay Pacific	
2008	Morinaga Milk Industry Lipton	
2008	Sato Pharmaceutical Assess E	
