= Abby Champion =

American fashion model (born 1997)

- Born: Abby Grace Champion; February 28, 1997 (age 29); Vestavia Hills, Alabama, U.S.
- Spouse: Patrick Schwarzenegger (m. 2025)
- Relatives: Arnold Schwarzenegger (father-in-law); Maria Shriver (mother-in-law); Shriver family (in-laws)
- Modeling information
- Height: 1.80 m (5 ft 11 in)
- Hair color: Blonde
- Eye color: Blue
- Agency: Ford Models (New York, Barcelona, São Paulo); Storm Management (London); Fabbrica (Milan); Next Management (Paris)

Abby Grace Schwarzenegger (née Champion; born February 28, 1997) is an American fashion model.

Her clients have included: Chanel, Givenchy, Tommy Hilfiger, Calvin Klein, Ralph Lauren, Swarovski, Versace, Victoria's Secret, and Louis Vuitton. She has also featured in multiple international versions of Vogue, the American and Australian versions of Harper's Bazaar, and the American version of Elle.

In May 2025, Models.com added Champion to their 'New Supers' list.

As of October 2026, she has walked 211 runways—opening 5 and closing 7, featured in 67 campaigns, 35 editorials, and 9 lookbooks.

== Early life ==
Champion was born in Vestavia Hills, Alabama, a suburb of Birmingham, (Note: Alabama's main newspaper says she was born in Vestavia Hills though many sources say she was born in Birmingham itself.) to Laura and Greg Champion. She has a sister who is also a model, as well as two brothers. Champion graduated from Vestavia Hills High School, where she was a cheerleader. She was discovered by a Next Management agent while in The Bahamas for a pageant with her sister. Champion had planned to go to Auburn University.

== Career ==
In September 2017, Champion made her runway show debut in a Milan Fashion Week appearance for Bottega Veneta. She opened her first show in January 2020 at Paris Fashion Week for Sacai, and the following month she closed her first show, also in Paris, but for Altuzarra.

Between 2024 and 2026, Champion switched agencies from Next Models in New York, and then subsequently from them again in London and Milan. She moved to Ford Models in New York, Storm in London, and Fabbrica in Milan.

As of October 2026, Champion has walked in 28 Chanel shows. She has also walked for Alberta Ferretti, Hermès, Carolina Herrera, Schiaparelli, and Zimmermann. Champion has done 13 Calvin Klein campaigns and 11 for Victoria's Secret, she has also completed 7 editorials for the American version of Vogue and 3 for the British counterpart.

Champion has worked with many different photographers, including: Inez and Vinoodh, Carlijn Jacobs, Luigi and Iango, Craig McDean, Alasdair McLellan, Steven Meisel, and Mert and Marcus.

== Personal life ==
Champion has been in a relationship with actor Patrick Schwarzenegger since 2015. Champion and Schwarzenegger married on September 6, 2025.
