= Heji Shin =

Korean photographer

- Born: 1976 (age 49–50); Seoul, South Korea
- Occupation: Photographer
- Notable work: #lonelygirl (2016); Baby (2016); Kanye (2018)

Heji Shin (born 1976) is a South Korean and German photographer known for her provocative, often overtly sexual, art and fashion portraits of people and animals. The New York Times named her one of the "biggest breakout stars of 2019".

== Early life ==
Heji Shin was born in Seoul in 1976 to Korean parents. Her parents divorced and her mother took her to Hamburg, where she grew up. She started photography after receiving a camera for her 20th birthday. She attended art school in Hamburg, but dropped out and moved to Berlin, where she started her photography career taking portraits for a German economics magazine.

== Career ==
Her commercial work includes the cover of Robyn's album Honey (2018) and a 2017 campaign for American fashion label Eckhaus Latta which featured photographs of couples engaging in sex acts that were censored with pixelation.

Her first US solo show was The Great Penetrator (2013), featuring portraits of hoofed animals from a Berlin zoo juxtaposed with images of a street corner and a naked hips and vagina.

Her 2016 series #lonelygirl parodied the trend of posting sexualized selfies online through a series of allegorical monkey selfies where a monkey named Jeany is a stand-in for the artist. A photograph of the monkey nibbling on a dildo was featured on the cover of the May 2016 issue of Artforum.

Her 2016 series Baby captures images of the heads of babies emerging from the birth canal. She said:

The first birth that I attended, I saw what was happening and I was like, oh, this moment was actually interesting. This was, of course, the complete pinnacle of the whole process, the head coming out. It was like an instant revelation because I'm really into portrait photography. These babies were actually, at that moment, not even babies. They look very alienating. They look very gruesome at some point. It was also like, intentional that they looked this way because the procedure of birth is something very similar to death. It is very excluded from public life, from social life, even in general, just out of the minds of people. It has, of course, a reason because it's violent, it includes a lot of aggression but there are, of course, the most essential parts of life.

In 2019, Shin exhibited a series of gigantic inkjet portraits of rapper Kanye West with loudly colored backgrounds that are a nod to the portraits of Andy Warhol. Photographing West was an arduous process. Shin followed West and his family to Uganda, but West refused to pose for the camera and kept skipping photo shoots Shin arranged. Shin finally photographed West in a Los Angeles studio, where he left after a shoot lasting only ten minutes. Shin said "What the fuck? Why? [...] He wasted so much money in this time. We set up so many shoots with him, and he always canceled. He spent $30,000 for nothing." Shin submitted her West portraits to the 2019 Whitney Bienneal, but met with resistance from curators who said they feared that West's celebrity and notoriety would dominate the show. At the time he was widely criticized for his support of Donald Trump and comments about slavery. Two West portraits were eventually accepted when Shin agreed to display five photos from the Baby series, but during the biennial, the curators placed West's large portraits in the basement between the restrooms and coat check. Shin said "I thought it was funny because everybody would see it and also wonder why, and then it's like the basement is the area for repressed content."

Her most recent work is a series of portraits of roosters called Big Cocks. Shin said "they're extremely, extremely beautiful [...] the short-lived outbursts of angry cock energy look Hellenistic and virile."

Though her work is provocative and boundary-crossing, she said "Doing something simply out of a desire to be transgressive is very stupid, you know, just to break certain taboos. It has to have more substance than that, I think."

Shin is married to the Canadian artist Mathieu Malouf.
