= Michael Bailey-Gates =

American artist, photographer and model

- Born: July 28, 1993 (age 32)
- Known for: Modeling, Photography
- Website: mikebaileygates.com

Michael Bailey-Gates (born July 28, 1993) is an American artist, photographer, and model. He was born in Rhode Island, and currently resides in New York City.

== Life ==
Michael Bailey-Gates grew up in Rhode Island where he worked an after school job at a photo studio. He continued on to receive his BFA in Photography from the School of Visual Arts in 2015.

== Work ==
=== Photographer ===
In 2013 Bailey-Gates met photographer Ryan McGinley and became a protégé of the artist. Bailey-Gates later debuted his body of work "A Horse The Rough" with New York Times in 2018. The pictures referenced early motion-study photographs "without the gender norms traditional to classical portraiture".

In 2021, Bailey-Gates’ first solo exhibition, "A Glint In The Kindling", was hosted at The Ravestijn Gallery, in Amsterdam. Chantal McStay, in a New York Times Style Magazine review of the exhibition, stated the photographs on display "evoked the aesthetics of classical portraiture as they upend conventions of gender and beauty." This body of work was published as the inaugural book by Pinch publishing in 2021.

In 2021 Bailey-Gates was the subject of homophobic backlash after releasing a self portrait commissioned for a Valentino campaign. The brand's designer, Pierpaolo Piccioli, condemned the backlash over the Valentino image.

Horace D. Ballard, in Aperture Magazine, describes Bailey-Gates’ photography as redefining traditional portraiture through "queer, neoclassical portraits" and notes his specialties in portraiture, studio and tableau photography.

=== Model ===
Bailey-Gates has modeled for the brands DKNY and CK One as well as for the publications i-D, Arena Homme +, and Interview. In 2015 Bailey-Gates was photographed by Terry Richardson for an editorial in Vogue Hommes International. In 2016, Michael Bailey-Gates appeared in his boyfriend Thomas Whiteside's book Route 1, Mike and India.

== Awards and honors ==
Bailey-Gates was listed as W Magazine's 10 young artists to follow in 2018. and in 2020 he was named one of Cultured magazines Young artists 2020.
