= Kiki Willems =

Dutch fashion model (born 1996)

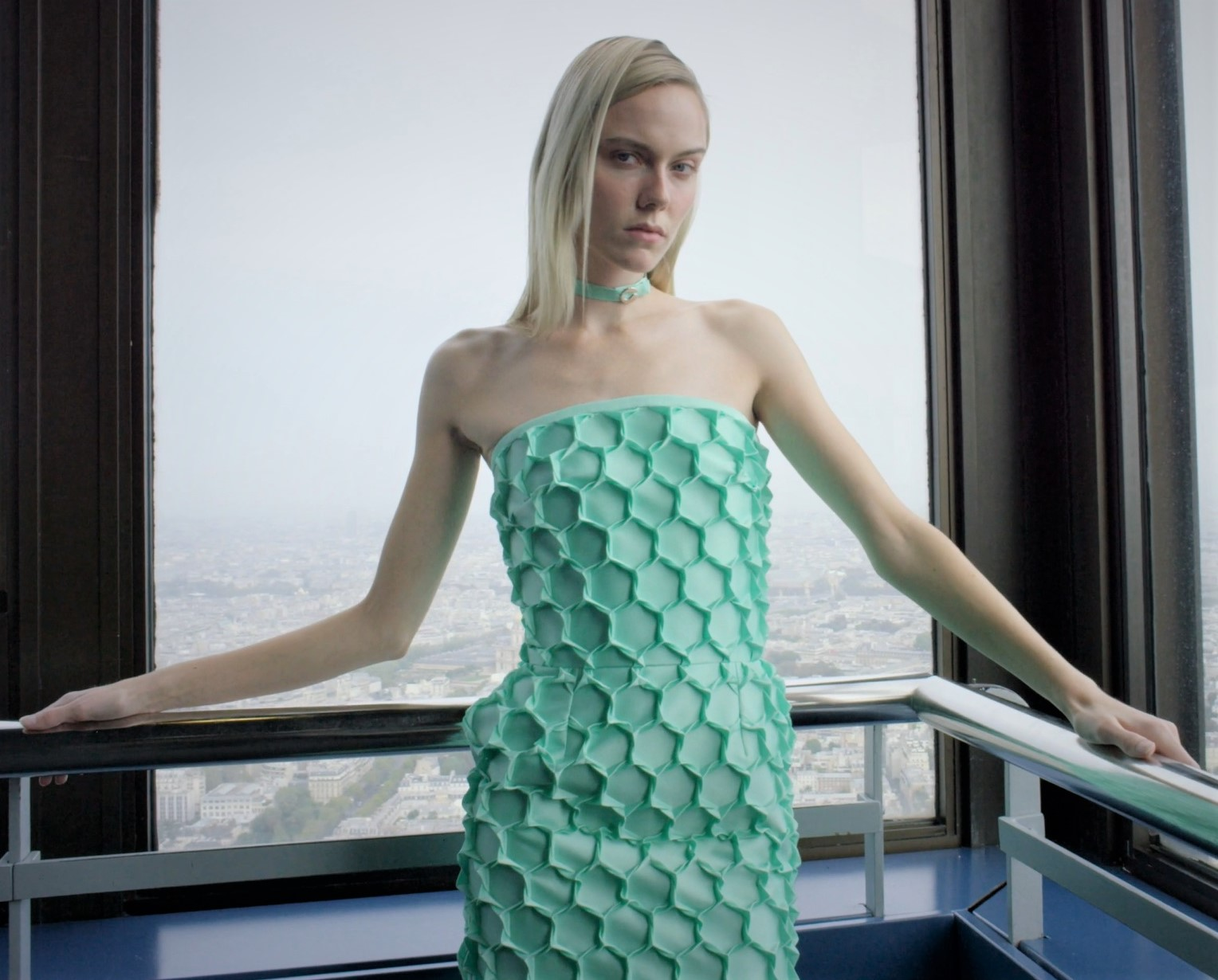
- Willems modeling Coperni in the Eiffel Tower in 2020
- Born: Kiki Diede Hanneloek Willems; 11 August 1996 (age 29); Maastricht, Netherlands
- Modeling information
- Height: 1.79 m (5 ft 10 1/2 in)
- Hair color: Blonde (naturally brown)
- Eye color: Blue
- Agencies: DNA Models (New York); VIVA Model Management (Paris, London)

Kiki Diede Hanneloek Willems (born 11 August 1996) is a Dutch fashion model. She made her debut opening Yves Saint Laurent's Spring/Summer 15 show, and its subsequent print campaign, photographed by Hedi Slimane.

== Career ==
Willems was born in Maastricht, Netherlands. Growing up she wanted to be a theater actress, taking classes and acting in several productions. After graduating high school Willems auditioned for the Maastricht Academy of Dramatic Arts, but was rejected. While working in a supermarket in Maastricht she was scouted and signed with IMG Models. Soon after she got a call for a Saint Laurent casting.

After that, Willems walked for many labels such as Dior, Diesel, Gucci, Givenchy, Miu Miu, Moschino, Lanvin, Louis Vuitton, and Marc Jacobs; and shot campaigns for MSGM, Prada, Simone Rocha, Proenza Schouler, among others. According to The Fashion Spot, for the Spring/Summer 2019 season, Willems tied with South Korean model Yoon Young Bae for having the most bookings. For a period of her career she had fiery red hair as her signature trait.

Among the magazine covers Willems was featured in, highlights include her September 2016 Vogue Italia cover, shot by Steven Meisel, and her Fall/Winter 2019 AnOther Magazine cover alongside her boyfriend, German model Jonas Glöer, shot by Willy Vanderperre and styled by Olivier Rizzo.

Willems is currently ranked as an "Industry Icon" by models.com.

== Personal life ==
Since October 2015, Willems is officially dating German model Jonas Glöer.
