= Hikari Mori =

Japanese model (born 1992)

- Born: Hikari Mori; April 22, 1992 (age 34); Minato City, Tokyo, Japan
- Education: Keio University
- Occupations: Model; actress; designer; television personality
- Employer: CNN
- Notable credit: CNN Seasons (CNN International) Anchor 2025‍–‍present)
- Parents: Akira Mori (father); Pamela Mori (mother)
- Relatives: Hanae Mori (grandmother); Izumi Mori (sister)
- Modeling information
- Height: 5 ft 11 in (1.80 m)
- Hair color: black
- Eye color: Brown

Hikari Mori (born April 22, 1992) is a Japanese model, actress, television host, and designer.

== Early life and education ==
Hikari Mori was born on 22 April 1992, in Minato City, Tokyo, Japan, to the Mori family. Mori’s grandmother, Hanae Mori (1926 – 2022), was a renowned Japanese designer and creative director of her eponymous fashion house. Mori attended Keio Girls' Senior High School, before moving to Keiō Chutobu Junior High School, and later to study her degree at Keio University in Japan.

== Career ==
Hikari is a model, actress, television host, and designer. She has worked for Shiseido, Tiffany & Co., Gucci and Dolce & Gabanna, as well as graced the covers of Vogue and Grazia China.

On September 2, 2025, Mori appeared in the first Episode Of CNN Global Trends Series ‘Seasons’ a series developed by Warner Bros. Discovery.

In 2025, she was selected to front first Episode Of CNN Global Trends Series ‘Seasons’ a series developed by Warner Bros. Discovery's news network to work across platforms, going live digitally on September 2, 2025.
