= Giampaolo Sgura =

Italian fashion photographer (born 1974)

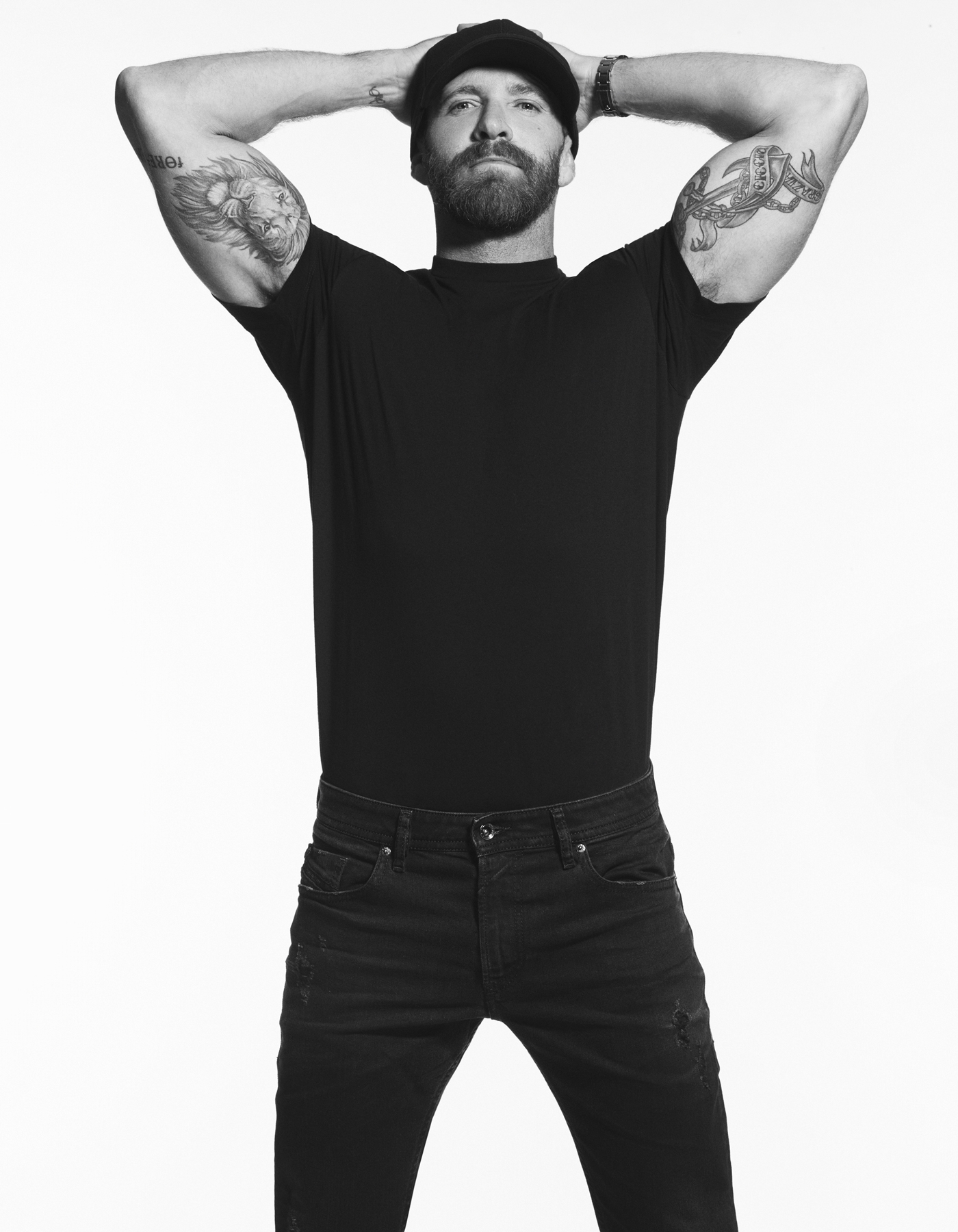
- by Andrea Sainato 2023
- Born: 7 August 1974 (age 51); Apulia, Italy
- Occupation: Fashion photographer
- Website: Official website

Giampaolo Sgura (born 1974) is an Italian fashion photographer.

He works with magazines, including international editions such as Vogue (France, Japan, Germany, Spain, Brazil, Mexico, Australia and Italia), Teen Vogue, Allure, Hercules, GQ Style (Great Britain and Germany), GQ (Spain and China) and Interview (Germany).

== Early life ==
Sgura is from Apulia. He completed his study in architecture in Milan. He begin his career in photography, after producing a reportage for Glamour. He was mentored by Richard Avedon and Irving Penn.

== Career ==
He has photographed for campaigns for Dolce & Gabbana, Roberto Cavalli, La Perla, Moschino, Versace and Ermenegildo Zegna. Giampaolo contributes to Vogue Japan, Vogue Deutsch, Vogue Korea, Vogue China, Vogue Paris, GQ, Allura, GQ Style, Italian Glamour, Hercules and Teen Vogue. Some of his fashion clients include MaxMara, Pierre Balmain, Romeo Gigli, Massimo Dutti, Emporio Armani, Gucci, Blumarine, Reebok, Twinset, Neiman Marcus, Saks and Revlon.
