= Binx Walton =

American fashion model (born 1996)

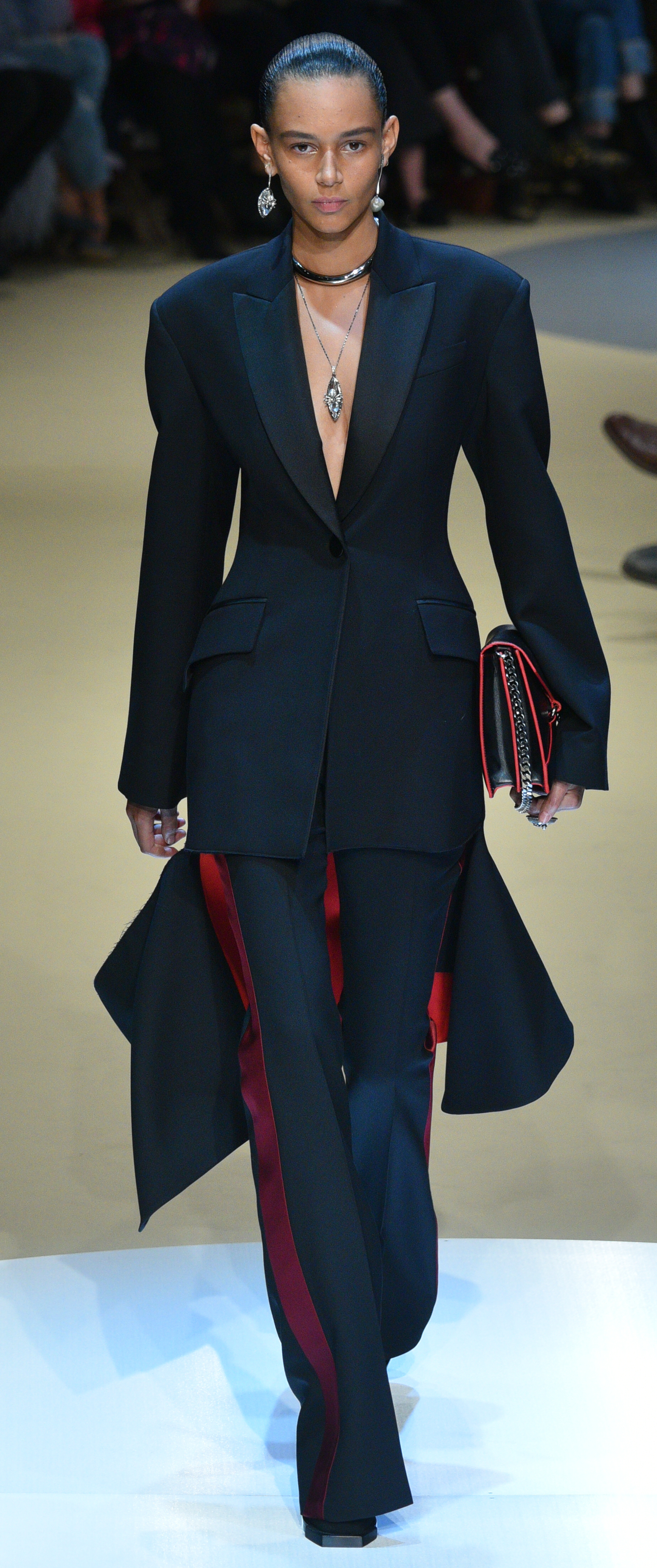
- Walton at the Alexander McQueen Fall Winter 2018 runway
- Born: Leona Anastasia Walton; April 24, 1996 (age 29); Los Angeles County, California, U.S.
- Modeling information
- Height: 5 ft 10.5 in (1.79 m)
- Hair color: Dark Brown
- Eye color: Brown
- Agency: Next Model Management (New York, Paris, Milan, London, Los Angeles); Le Management (Copenhagen); AMAX Talent (Nashville)

Leona Anastasia "Binx" Walton (born April 24, 1996) is an American fashion model based in New York City. Walton ranks as an "Industry Icon" on models.com.

== Early life ==
Walton was born in California, United States. When she was an infant, her family moved to Hawaii, and then to Knoxville, Tennessee at age six. She is multiracial, her mother Teri Walton is white. She has African American, Irish, Dutch, German, Indian, and Eastern Asian heritage. The nickname "Binx" was given to her as a child by her brothers, after the Star Wars character Jar Jar Binks. She made her catwalk debut at age 16 in the Marc Jacobs Autumn/Winter 2013 show.

== Career ==
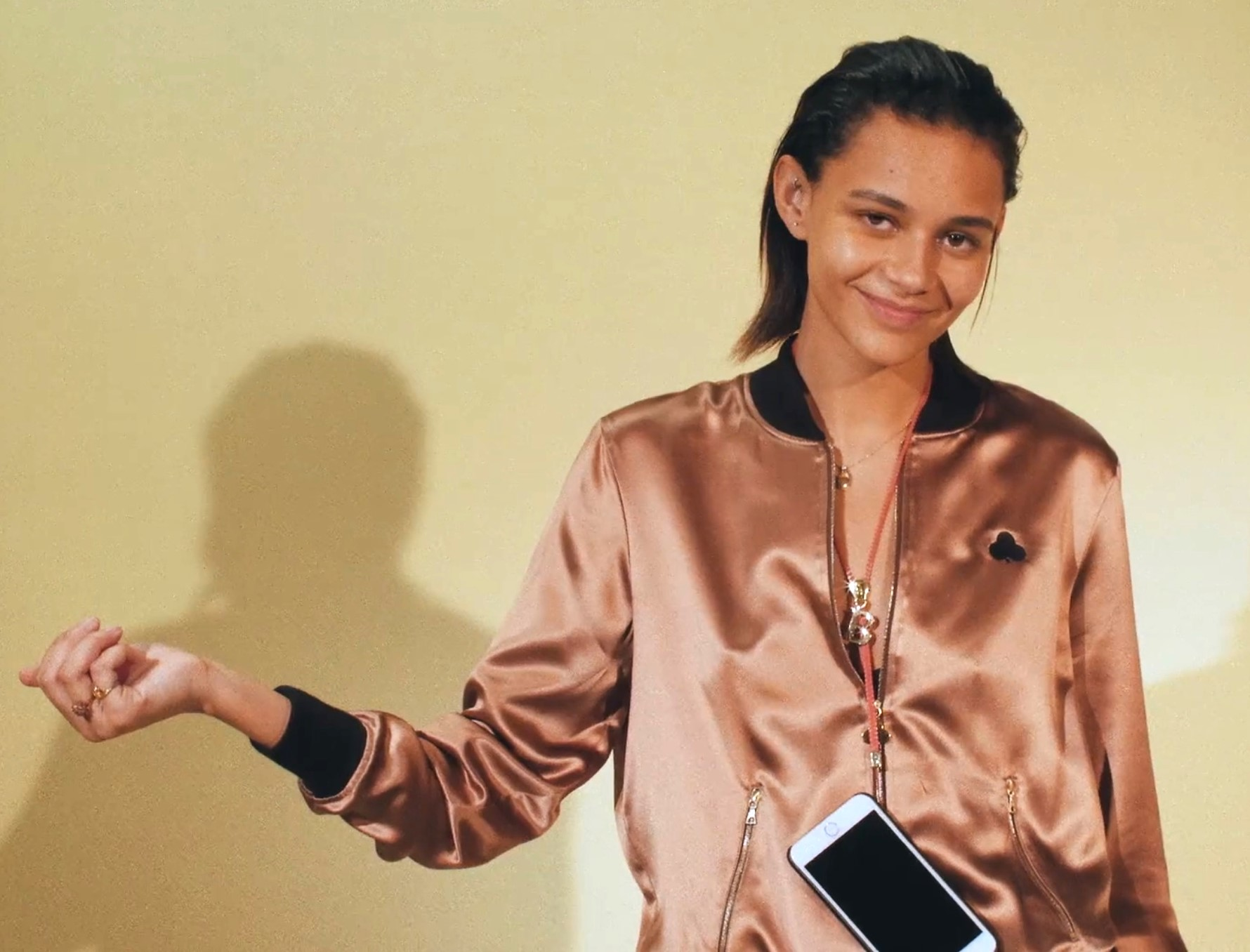
Walton for Chaos, 2016

Walton's breakthrough moment into the fashion industry came when she was cast in the Céline Spring/Summer 2014 show. She went on to star in major campaigns for Chanel, Balmain and Coach, and has walked in 37 fashion shows for Spring/Summer 2016. She is currently collaborating with Superga to help design some of the shoes for their campaign. She is good friends with models Catherine McNeil and Lexi Boling.

She has appeared in editorials for French, British, Spanish, German, Russian, and Japanese Vogue, LOVE, W, Dazed, Garage, i-D, and WSJ. Magazine. She has appeared on the covers of British, Italian, Spanish, Thai and Japanese Vogue, French Elle, Garage, i-D, and Dazed.

She has walked the runways for Alexander McQueen, Calvin Klein, Valentino, Fendi, Diane Von Fürstenberg, Moschino, Chanel, Oscar de la Renta, DKNY, Miu Miu, Derek Lam, Philipp Plein, Alexander Wang, Emilio Pucci, Prada, Marc Jacobs, Sacai, Christian Dior, Balmain, Lanvin, Céline, Proenza Schouler, Stella McCartney, Kenzo, Michael Kors, Coach, Anthony Vaccarello, Tom Ford, Salvatore Ferragamo, Vera Wang, Gucci, Dries Van Noten, Roberto Cavalli, Yves Saint Laurent, Bottega Veneta, Prabal Gurung, Versace, Balmain, Tommy Hilfiger, Jason Wu, Tory Burch, Viktor & Rolf, Giles Deacon, and Hugo Boss.

Walton has appeared in advertising campaigns for Calvin Klein, Dior, Marc Jacobs, Vera Wang, Chanel, Tom Ford, Coach, Fendi, DKNY, Hugo Boss, rag+bone, Balmain, Céline, Theory, Adidas, and Public School.

In November 2019, Walton joined models.com's "Industry Icons" list.
