= Hannah Motler =

British fashion model (born 2001)

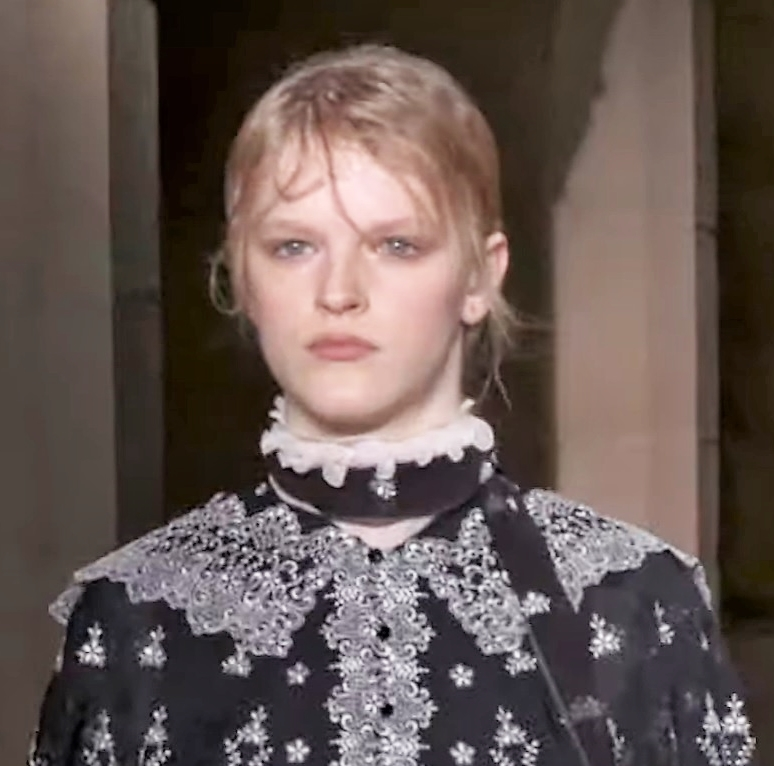
- Motler in 2020
- Born: Hannah Elizabeth Motler; 6 June 2001 (age 25); Manchester, England
- Occupation: Fashion model
- Modelling information
- Hair colour: Blonde
- Eye colour: Blue
- Agency: Women Management (New York); Oui Management (Paris); The Fabbrica (Milan); Scoop Models (Copenhagen); Le Management (Hamburg); Two Models (Los Angeles); Kult Australia (Sydney); Premier Model Management (London) (mother agency)

Hannah Elizabeth Motler is a British fashion model.

== Career ==
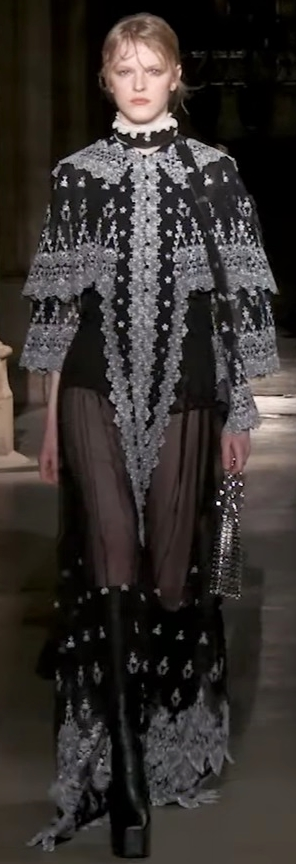
Motler walks the runway at the Paco Rabanne Fall-Winter 2020-2021 show

Motler was discovered at age 12, by Premier Model Management while at a One Direction concert in Manchester. Her first show was for Calvin Klein. In her debut season she also walked for Erdem, Dries van Noten, and Versus Versace, (shows which she opened); Miu Miu, Dior, Prada, Moschino, Giambattista Valli, Victoria Beckham, Helmut Lang, Fendi, Marc Jacobs, JW Anderson, Burberry, Coach New York, Givenchy, Chloé, Valentino, Sonia Rykiel, Maison Margiela, and Louis Vuitton.

Motler has modelled in campaigns for Versace, Miu Miu, and Coach New York, and editorials for magazines including British Vogue, Interview, and Love. Vogue has described her as an "English rose" and "an unstoppable force".
