= Shanelle Nyasiase =

Ethiopian-born South Sudanese fashion model

- Born: 3 January 1997 (age 29); Gambela, Ethiopia
- Occupation: Model
- Modeling information
- Hair color: Brown
- Eye color: Brown
- Agency: Women Management (New York); MP Management (Paris, Milan, Atlanta, Chicago, Los Angeles, Stockholm); Storm Management (London)

Shanelle Nyasiase (born 3 January 1997) is an Ethiopian-born South Sudanese fashion model.

== Early life ==
Nyasiase was born in Gambela, Ethiopia. At age nine, she moved to Juba, South Sudan. Nyasiase has three siblings. At thirteen she moved to Nairobi, Kenya.

== Career ==
Nyasiase modeled locally in Kenya before being discovered. She made her fashion week runway debut during the F/W 2017 season, walking for Miu Miu, Rick Owens, and Armani. In 2018, she walked for Tom Ford, Jason Wu, Marc Jacobs, Burberry, Erdem, Mulberry, Gucci, Marni, Versace, Rochas, Dries Van Noten and Kenzo among others. Nyasiase notably closed the S/S 2019 Balenciaga show.

She has appeared in advertisements for Versace, Alexander McQueen, Marc Jacobs, and Issey Miyake.

She currently ranks on the “Hot List” by models.com. British Vogue listed her as one of the Top Models of London Fashion Week.

For a Vogue video about South Sudanese models, Nyasiase described how the Trump travel ban affects her career.
