= Faretta (model) =

Croatian model (born 1998)

Faretta Radic
- Born: Antonija Radić; 11 March 1998 (age 28); Split, Croatia
- Modeling information
- Height: 1.80 m (5 ft 11 in)
- Hair color: Brown
- Eye color: Green

Antonija Radić (born 11 March 1998), known professionally as Faretta, is a Croatian fashion model. She has appeared on multiple Vogue covers, including the covers of British Vogue, Vogue Italia, in editorials for Vogue, W, and international editions of Harper's Bazaar and L'Officiel.

== Early life and education ==
Faretta was born in Split, Croatia. She was scouted in 2015 while walking down the street in her hometown, Split. She began working full-time as a model after earning a degree as a pharmaceutical technician at a medical high school.

She holds a degree and has also undertaken studies in analytics, finance, and marketing through the Wharton School Online.

== Career ==
Faretta debuted as a Givenchy exclusive in 2016, She subsequently opened shows for Victoria Beckham, Roberto Cavalli, Mugler, Chanel, and opened and closed Valentino shows several times. She also closed the Chloé show; she walked for almost every designer including Saint Laurent, Céline, Miu Miu, Alexander McQueen, Chanel, Dior, Alberta Ferretti, Isabel Marant, Marc Jacobs, Versace, Prada, Alexander Wang, Michael Kors, Valentino, Fendi, and Ralph Lauren. W magazine chose her as one of the 15 breakout models of the spring 2017 fashion week, while Vogue stated, "It's rare for a model to have the total package of a powerful walk, commanding presence, and next-level beauty, but somehow Faretta managed it."

Faretta has appeared in advertising campaigns as the face of major fashion brands, including Ralph Lauren, Blumarine, Salvatore Ferragamo, Valentino, Zara, Lanvin, Versace, Miu Miu.

She has appeared on the cover of Vogue Russia, Vogue Japan, British Vogue, Vogue Spain, and Vogue Germany. She has also appeared in W, Vogue, Vogue Italia, Vogue Paris, Harper's Bazaar, and V.

She is listed in The Business of Fashion 500, which recognizes individuals shaping the global fashion industry. In 2017 she made the top 50 models list.

Faretta Radic won the Best Model of the Year award at the ELLE Style Awards 2026, held on November 14th,2026, at the newly renovated Mimara Museum in Zagreb. This marked the second time she received the Best Model of the Year title from Elle Croatia, exactly 10 years after her first win in 2016.

== Videography ==
Year	Title	Artist	Role
2017	Versace on the Floor (Versace edition)	Bruno Mars	Herself
