= Cara Taylor =

American high fashion model (born 2001)

- Born: April 23, 2001 (age 25); Huntsville, Alabama, U.S.
- Occupation: Model
- Years active: 2016–present
- Relatives: sister - Jenna Taylor
- Modeling information
- Height: 1.80 m (5 ft 11 in)
- Hair color: Brown
- Eye color: Green
- Agency: Ford Models (New York City, Paris); Next Management (Paris, London); Monster Management (Milan); The Squad (London); Modelwerk (Hamburg); Freedom Models (Los Angeles); Le Management (Copenhagen); Onyx Model Management (Huntsville) (mother agency)

Cara Taylor (born April 23, 2001) is an American fashion model.

== Career ==
Taylor was discovered via Instagram. She debuted as an Alexander Wang exclusive in 2017. That season she walked in 41 shows for designers including Alberta Ferretti, Balmain, Stella McCartney, Michael Kors, Dolce & Gabbana, Céline, Fendi, Ralph Lauren, Dior, Chanel, Versus (Versace) and Versace. She has appeared in advertisements for Calvin Klein, Salvatore Ferragamo, Hugo Boss, Fendi, Michael Kors, Tom Ford, Prada, Mango, Coach New York, Saint Laurent, Diane von Fürstenberg, Marc Jacobs, and Reebok.

Taylor currently ranks as a "Top 50" model by models.com
