= Lexi Boling =

American fashion model (born 1993)

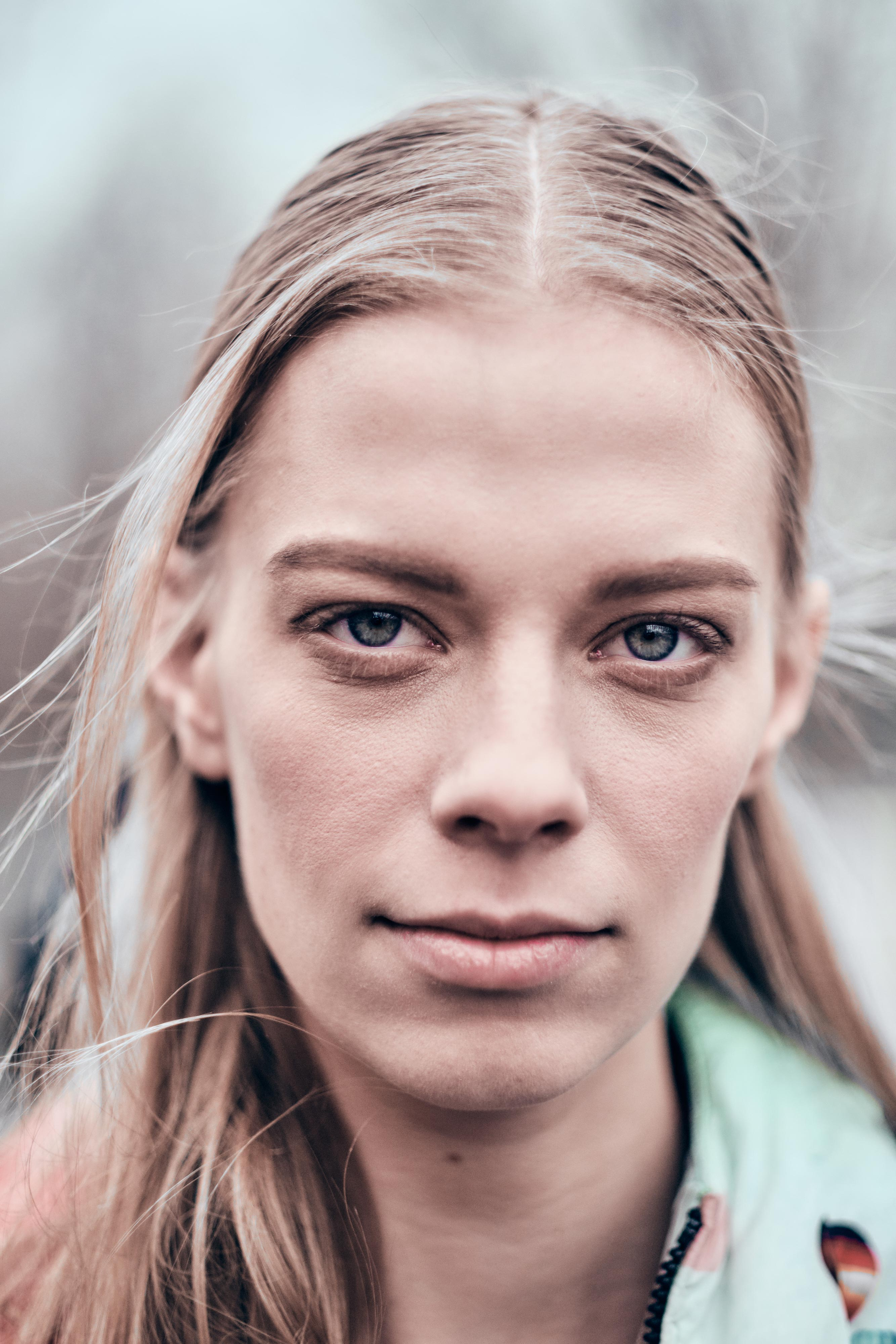
- Boling in 2019
- Born: Alexis Makenzie Boling; August 31, 1993 (age 33); Rockford, Illinois, U.S.
- Occupation: Model
- Years active: 2013–present
- Partner: Ben Allen (2016–present)
- Modeling information
- Height: 5 ft 11.25 in (1.81 m)
- Hair color: Blonde
- Eye color: Blue
- Agency: HEROES Model Management (New York) Oui Management (Paris) Special Management (Milan) Premier Model Management (London) Heartbreak Management (Copenhagen)

Alexis Makenzie Boling (born August 31, 1993), is an American fashion model. She is best known for her multiple covers for Vogue Italia and her appearances in numerous Prada campaigns.

== Biography ==
Boling was born in Rockford, Illinois. At age 18, her mother coerced her into attending an open casting call being held by Ford Models. She had braces at the time of the call, and once these were removed, she signed as a model. Her first fashion show was Alexander Wang Spring/Summer 2014. She is currently signed with Heroes Model Management worldwide. She lives in New York City.

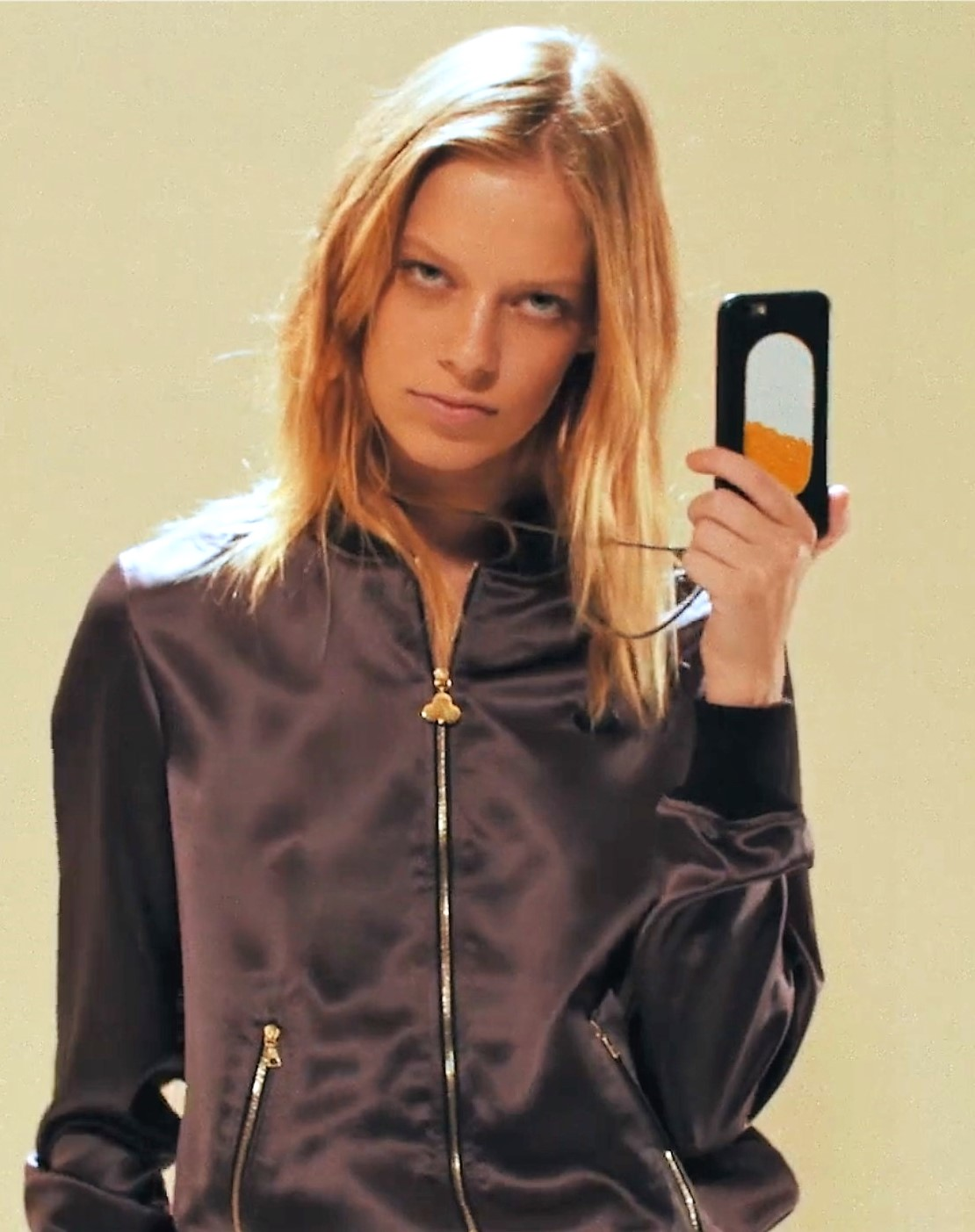
Boling for Chaos in 2016

She has appeared in editorials for Italian, American, French, British, Russian, and Japanese Vogue, W, LOVE, V, Numéro, and Dazed. She has appeared on the cover of Italian, Japanese, Chinese, Korean, Turkish, Thai and Mexican Vogue, Garage, and Numéro.

Boling has walked the runways for Tom Ford, Saint Laurent, Miu Miu, Valentino, Loewe, Calvin Klein, Isabel Marant, Chanel, Givenchy, Alexander McQueen, Versace, Donna Karan, Bottega Veneta, Prada, Moschino, Fendi, Anna Sui, Marc Jacobs, Coach, rag+bone, Michael Kors, Tommy Hilfiger, Alexander Wang, Dior, Céline, Thierry Mugler, Balenciaga, Dolce & Gabbana, Max Mara, Jil Sander, Salvatore Ferragamo, Hugo Boss, Diane Von Furstenberg, Proenza Schouler, Roberto Cavalli, Lanvin, Jason Wu, Maison Margiela, Sonia Rykiel, Viktor & Rolf, Gucci, Vera Wang, Vionnet, Giorgio Armani, Hermès, Tory Burch, Chloé, Blumarine, and Louis Vuitton.

She has appeared in advertising campaigns for Alexander Wang, Jimmy Choo, Chanel, Prada, Coach, DSquared2, Marc Jacobs, Dior, Moschino, Givenchy, Diesel, Jil Sander, Versace, Thierry Mugler, Hugo Boss, Giada, Tommy Hilfiger, and Mango.

Boling is currently ranked as an "Industry Icon" by models.com.
