= Fernanda Ly =

Australian fashion model

Fernanda Lý
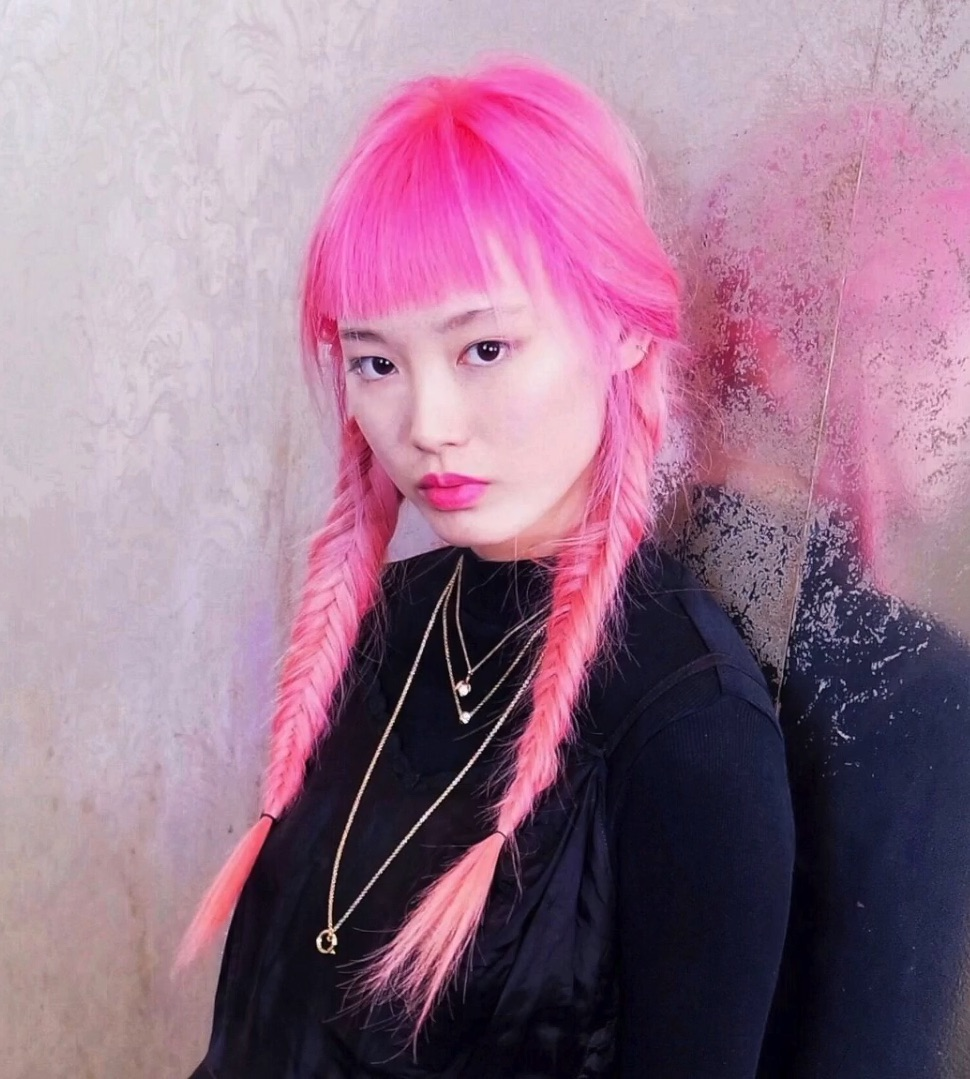
- Ly in 2018
- Born: Fernanda Hin Lin Ly; October 22, 1995 (age 30); Sydney, Australia
- Modeling information
- Height: 1.73 m (5 ft 8 in)
- Hair color: Black
- Eye color: Brown
- Agency: DNA Models (New York); Priscilla’s Model Management (Sydney) (mother agency)

Fernanda Hin Lin Ly (born October 22, 1995) is an Australian fashion model. She is best known for her pink hair.

== Early life ==
Ly is of Chinese-Vietnamese descent.

== Career ==
Ly was discovered at a mall and debuted as a Louis Vuitton exclusive, gaining overnight attention for her pink hair. Before modelling, Ly studied architecture.

Ly has been on the cover of Vogue Australia, Teen Vogue, and Vogue Italia.

In 2017, she appeared in two ad campaigns for Kate Spade New York. She has also been in advertisements for Chanel Beauty, American Eagle Outfitters, Forever 21, Dior, Tiffany & Co., Gap Inc., Louis Vuitton, and H&M.

In addition to her modelling career, Ly runs a YouTube channel called Ferntube (stylised in all caps), which has been active since 2020.
