= Inez and Vinoodh =

Dutch fashion photographer duo

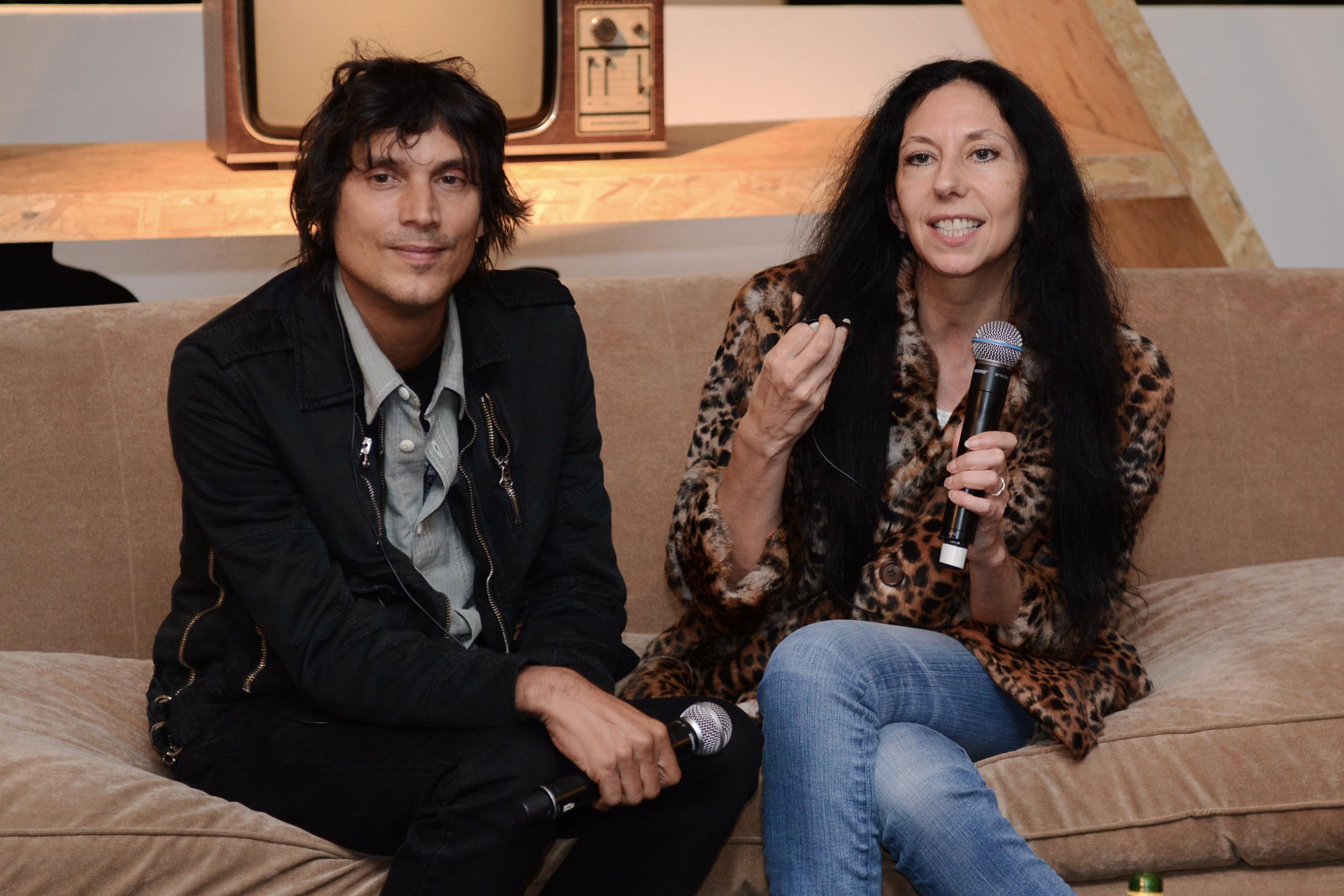
Vinoodh Matadin and Inez van Lamsweerde in June 2011

Inez van Lamsweerde (born 25 September 1963) and Vinoodh Matadin (born 29 September 1961) are a Dutch-American fashion photographer duo, whose work has been featured in fashion magazines and advertising campaigns. They also produce independent art work.

Working together since 1986, the partnership has staged exhibitions and collaborative projects and participated in international group shows. Inez and Vinoodh live in New York with their son, Charles Star Matadin.

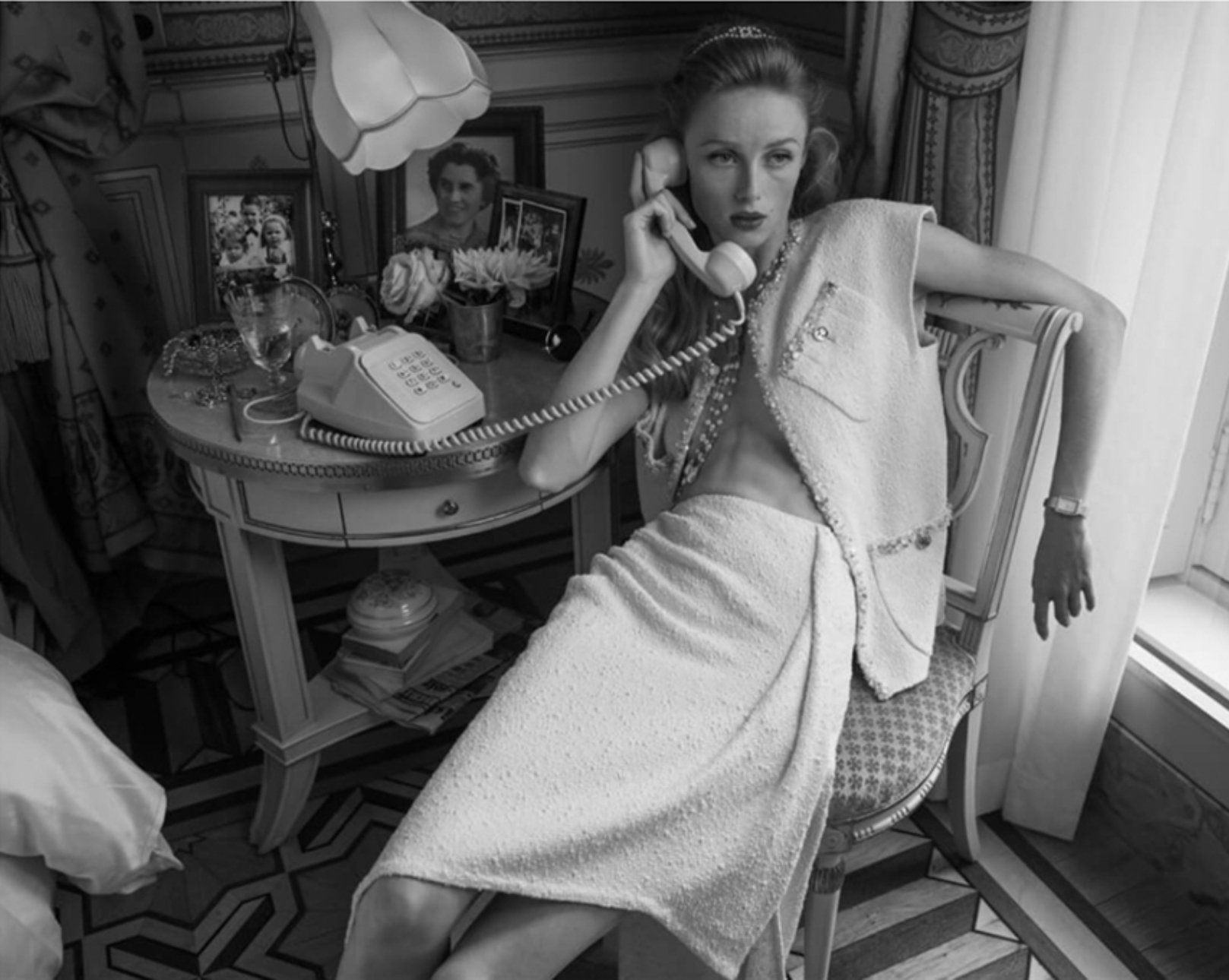

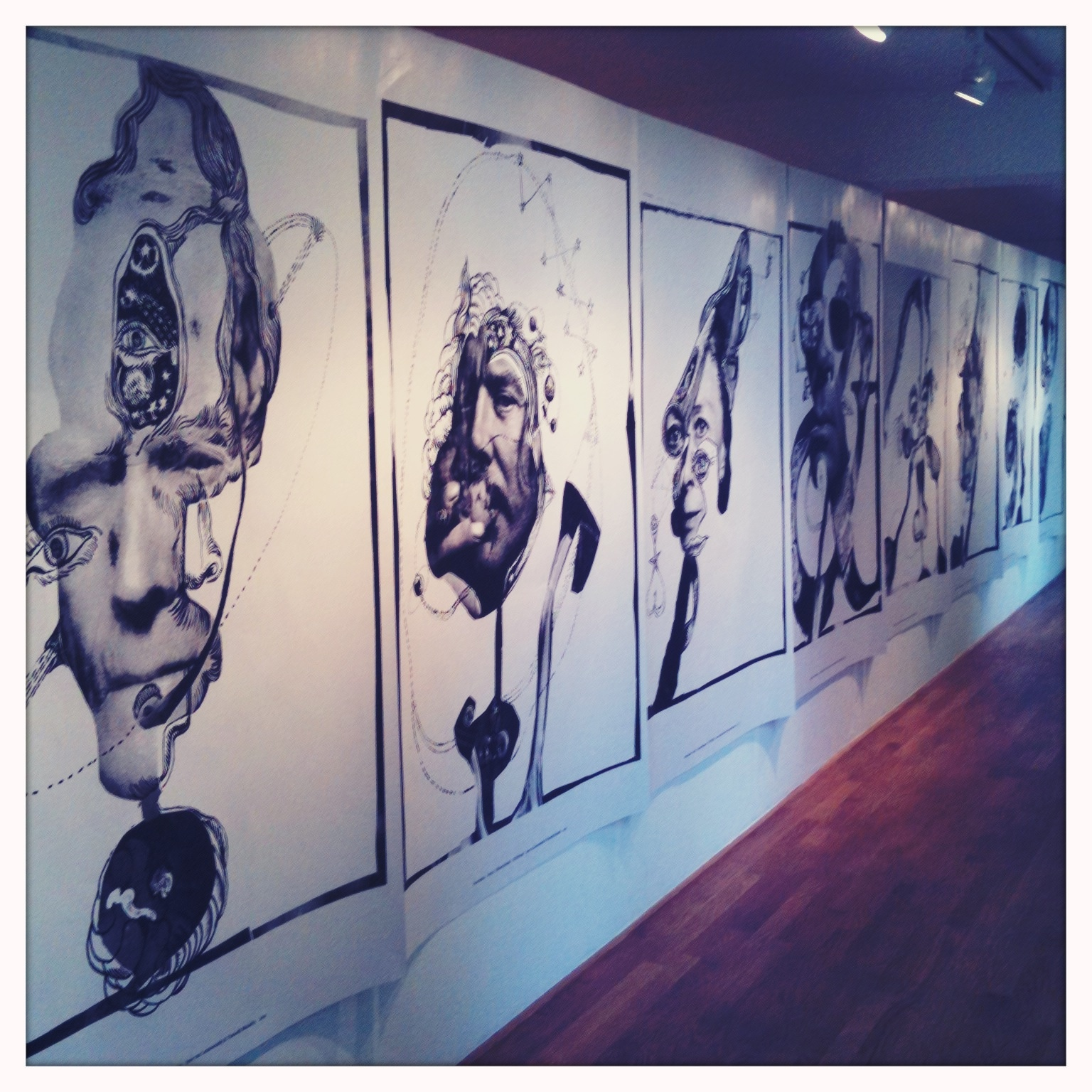
Inez & Vinoodh at the FoAm, 2010

== Lives and career ==
Lamsweerde and Matadin were born in Amsterdam, Netherlands.

=== Meeting ===
Inez and Vinoodh met at the Fashion Academy Vogue in their hometown, Amsterdam, where they both initially studied fashion design—Vinoodh from 1981 to 1985 and Inez from 1983 to 1985. Inez took a master's degree in photography at the Gerrit Rietveld Academie (1985–1990) and Vinoodh founded the Lawina clothing line with his classmate Rick Bovendeert. A commission for Inez to photograph the 1986 Lawina collection led to Vinoodh beginning to work with her, first as a stylist and eventually in 1995 as co-author of the images they produce together. The Lawina label closed in 1990 when Inez graduated and the pair began practicing as artists.

=== Fashion and celebrity photography ===
The duo have shot campaigns for Chanel, Calvin Klein, Louis Vuitton and Miu Miu, as well as Louis Vuitton under creative director Virgil Abloh. In 2023, they shot Taylor Swift for Time magazine’s Person of the Year covers.

=== Music-related work ===
In 2015, they shot the single cover for "Only One", a collaboration between Kanye West and Paul McCartney, along with directing the video for "FourFiveSeconds", a song by Rihanna, featuring West and McCartney.

=== Collaborations ===
Since 1999, they have worked regularly with Icelandic polymath Björk on several music videos and high profile magazine editorials. In February 2019, they released a jewelry collaboration with Mene, a brand co-founded by Pablo Picasso's granddaughter, Diana Widmaier Picasso. They also released a line of jewelry with New York brand Ten Thousand Things.

=== Return to New York ===
Inez and Vinoodh returned to New York permanently in 1994. Their list of editorial contributions includes fashion titles Vogue, Paris Vogue, Vogue Italia, W, Visionaire, Vanity Fair, Harper's Bazaar, L'Uomo Vogue, Vogue Hommes International, Vogue Nippon and Vogue China as well as style magazines Purple Fashion, Interview, V, V Man, Self Service, Another, Pop, i-D, Fantastic Man, and The Gentlewoman.

=== Film ===
The duo has shot supermodel Kate Moss while dancing to Michael Jackson's Billie Jean on film; they also directed Lady Gaga's 2013 music video for "Applause". They shot the single cover for "Applause" and shot single covers for other songs from Gaga's album Artpop. They were featured in her ArtRave and shot An Artpop Film.

=== Retrospectives ===
In 2010, Pretty Much Everything: Photographs 1985–2010, a retrospective exhibition of 300 works from 25 years' work was staged at FOAM Fotografiemuseum in Amsterdam. The show began its international tour in summer 2011 at the Bienal Pavilion in São Paulo, Brazil.

=== Books ===
In 2011, Inez and Vinoodh's monograph, Pretty Much Everything was released. Designed in collaboration with M/M (Paris), it was published by Taschen in two volumes, each containing 333 pages and a pocket book-sized reader featuring essays and fiction by Michael Bracewell, Antony Hegarty, Penny Martin, Glenn O'Brien, Bruce Sterling and Olivier Zahm, with lyrics by Björk and Lady Gaga.
