= Luigi & Iango =

Italo-Swiss photography duo

Luigi Murenu and Iango Henzi are an Italo-Swiss fashion photography duo.

== Career ==
Luigi & Iango began working together in 2013. Together they have shot over 300 covers for various editions of Vogue. Exhibitions about their work have posted hosted at the Brooklyn Museum, Montreal Museum of Fine Arts, Kunsthal, Musée des Arts Décoratifs, Royal Palace of Milan, and the World's Expo 2020. About their work the performance artist Marina Abramović said "Entering Luigi & Iango’s working and living space is to enter an entirely different world, where everything is possible and unexpected things happen. It’s a world of creativity without limits." They are frequent collaborators with the American singer Madonna.

== Bibliography ==
- Luigi & Iango: Unveiled (Phaidon Press, 2023)
