= Selena Forrest =

American fashion model

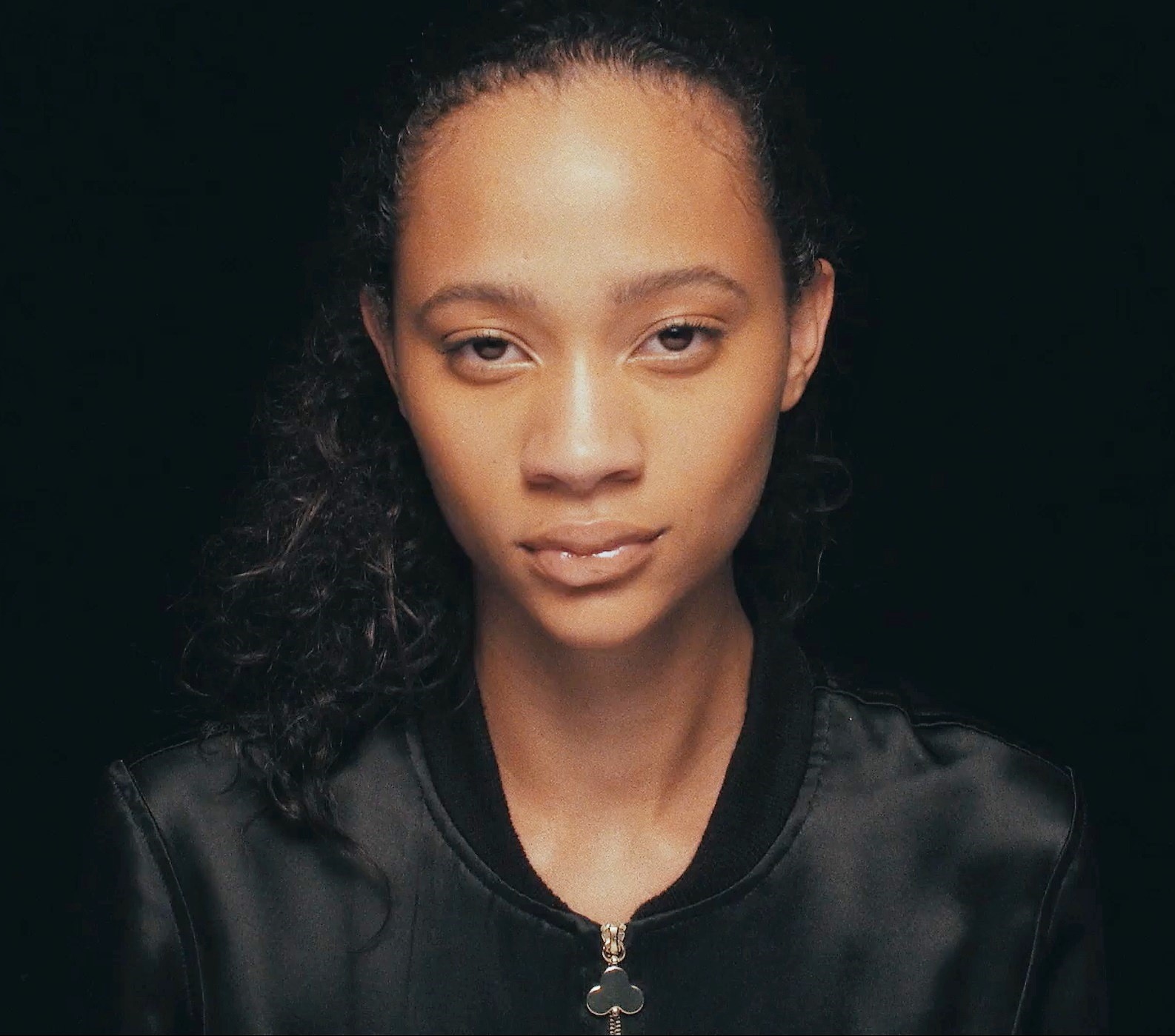
- Forrest for Chaos in 2016
- Born: April 29, 1999 (age 27); Lafayette, Louisiana, U.S.
- Occupation: Model
- Years active: 2015–present
- Modeling information
- Height: 1.78 m (5 ft 10 in)
- Hair color: Brown
- Eye color: Brown
- Agency: Next Model Management (New York, Paris, Milan, London, Los Angeles, Miami)

Selena Forrest (born April 29, 1999), is an American fashion model. As of 2017, Models.com ranked her as one of the Top 50 models in the fashion industry.

== Early life ==
Forrest was born in Lafayette, Louisiana, and relocated to California after Hurricane Katrina. She changed schools repeatedly as her family moved first to San Pedro, then Long Beach, and finally Riverside.

== Career ==
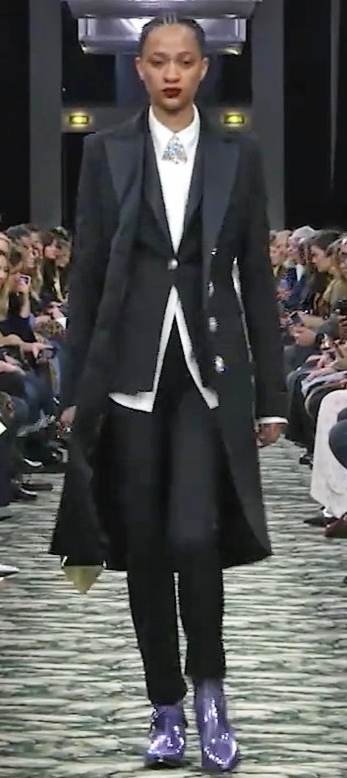
Forrest walks at the Paco Rabanne Fall Winter 2019-20 show

Forrest was discovered in Huntington Beach in 2015. Forrest manually removed her own braces to launch her career and first job.

A few months later, Forrest signed with Next Models, debuting as a Proenza Schouler exclusive in 2016. She has appeared in campaigns for Yves Saint Laurent, Proenza Schouler, Calvin Klein, Prada, Dior, Valentino, Fenty Beauty, Topshop, DKNY, H&M and Adidas.

On the runway she has walked for Alexander McQueen, Céline, Chanel, Emilio Pucci (which she closed) Fendi, Kenzo, Oscar de la Renta, Roberto Cavalli, Tom Ford, Vera Wang, and Versace among many others.

She was the cover model for the i-D "Futurewise" issue as well as twice appearing on the cover The New York Times style magazine, T.

Forrest has spoken out on issues of racial equity in the fashion industry, critiquing designers who don't cast models of color as well as the lack of stylists able to care for black women's hair properly.

== Personal life ==
Speaking to The Cut, Forrest described her sexuality as, "I love girls. Or, you know what, I just love people. So, that’s what it is. I don’t really categorize it, but if there was a category, I would probably be bisexual. But I have never been with a guy.".
