= Vogue Japan =

Japanese fashion magazine

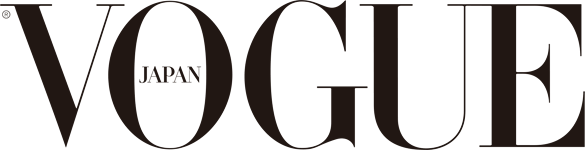

- Cover of the 25th Anniversary special issue (January 2025), Ai Tominaga by Nick Yang
- Categories: Fashion
- Frequency: Monthly
- First issue: September 1999; 27 years ago
- Company: Condé Nast Japan
- Country: Japan
- Based in: Osuga Building; Shibuya, Tokyo, Japan
- Language: Japanese
- Website: vogue.co.jp

Vogue Japan, previously published as Vogue Nippon (stylised in all caps), is a Japanese monthly fashion magazine. It has been published in Tokyo since 1999.

== Background ==
Vogue Japan is the Japanese edition of the American fashion magazine Vogue. Founded in 1999 as Vogue Nippon, as Vogue Japan since 2011.

The magazine is a monthly publication, published twelve times per year.

=== Editors ===
Editor-in-Chief	Start year	End year
Hiromi Sogo (十河 ひろ美)	1999	2001
Kazuhiro Saito (斎藤和弘)	2001	2008
Mitsuko Watanabe (渡辺 三津子)	2008	2022
Tiffany Godoy (ティファニー・ゴドイ)	2022	2025
Kazumi Asamura Hayashi (林香寿美)	2026	2026

== History ==
Japanese Vogue made its debut with the September 1999 issue (on newsstands 28 July 1999), featuring British model Kate Moss and Japanese model Miki by Craig McDean. The magazine was published as a joint-venture between Condé Nast and Nikkei through Nikkei Condé Nast. Hiromi Sogo, who previously edited 25ans was appointed to the role of editor-in-chief.

The March 2026, Ariana Grande cover story caused controversy over an editorial image that showed Grande with six fingers. Grande responded with an Instagram comment stating "oh goodness how exciting ! i’ve been saying I need some extra appendages so that i can start an album ! thankful for this."

== See also ==
- Vogue, American edition in publication since 1892
- List of Vogue Japan cover models
