= Craig McDean =

British photographer

- Born: 1964 (age 61–62); Middlewich, England
- Occupation: Fashion photographer
- Spouse: Tabitha Simmons (divorced)
- Children: 2

Craig McDean (born 1964 in England) is a British fashion photographer, originally from Middlewich, now based in New York City.

== Life ==
McDean originally trained and worked as a car mechanic before studying photography at Mid Cheshire College (OND) and Blackpool and The Fylde College of Further & Higher Education (PQE) where he took photography classes before he dropped out and moved to London.

McDean began his photographic career in London as a photographer's assistant to photographer Nick Knight. His early editorial work was featured in magazines such as i-D and The Face, which led to advertising campaign work for clients such as Jil Sander and Calvin Klein, and editorial commissions with Harper's Bazaar and Vogue.

More recently, McDean has photographed fashion campaigns for clients including Gucci, Giorgio Armani, Emporio Armani, Oscar de la Renta, Yves Saint Laurent, Calvin Klein, and Estée Lauder.

His editorial spreads are regularly featured in magazines including Vogue, W, and Another Magazine. Although primarily a fashion photographer, McDean has photographed portraits of celebrities including Björk, Madonna, Natalie Portman, Justin Timberlake, Jennifer Aniston, Joaquin Phoenix, Hilary Swank, Uma Thurman, Gael García Bernal and Nicole Kidman.

In 2008, McDean was given an Infinity Award for Applied/Fashion/Advertising Photography by the International Center of Photography.

He is represented by Art + Commerce in New York.

McDean was married to British fashion designer Tabitha Simmons before they divorced in 2013. They have two sons.

== Books ==
- I Love Fast Cars (Powerhouse Books, 1999) ISBN 978-1576870594.
- Lifescapes (Steidl/Dangin, 2005) ISBN 978-3865210333.
- Amber, Guinevere and Kate 1993-2005, A decade of Fashion Photography by Craig McDean (Rizzoli, 2013) ISBN 978-0847840823
- Craig McDean: Manual (Rizzoli, 2019) ISBN 978-0847866205
