= List of Vogue Italia cover models =

This list of Vogue Italia cover models (1964–present) is a catalog of cover models who have appeared on the cover of Vogue Italia, the Italian edition of American fashion magazine Vogue. From 1964 to 1965 the magazine was named Novità, and then from 1965 to 1966 it was named Vogue Italia & Novità, and since 1966 it has been named Vogue Italia.

== 1960s ==
=== 1964 ===
Issue	Cover model	Photographer
October	Wilhelmina Cooper	Irving Penn
November	Mirella Petteni	Gian Paolo Barbieri
December/January 1965	Catherine Spaak	Leombruno-Bodi

=== 1965 ===
Issue	Cover model	Photographer
February	Benedetta Barzini	Bert Stern
March	Brigitte Bauer	Bert Stern
April	Wilhelmina Cooper	David Bailey
May	Kecia Nyman	Irving Penn
June	Deborah Dixon	Guy Bourdin
July/August	Veruschka	Art Kane
September	Mariolina della Gatta	Gian Paolo Barbieri
October	Jennifer O'Neill	Irving Penn
November	Benedetta Barzini	Gian Paolo Barbieri
December	Isa Stoppi	Gian Paolo Barbieri

=== 1966 ===
Issue	Cover model	Photographer
January	Sue Murray	David Bailey
February	Benedetta Barzini	Irving Penn
March	Mickey Belverger	Guy Bourdin
April	Paola Pitagora	Franco Rubartelli
May	Brigitte Bauer	Richard Avedon
June	Audrey Hepburn	Franco Rubartelli
July/August	Veruschka	Franco Rubartelli
September	Brigitte Bauer	Irving Penn
October	Brigitte Bauer	Bert Stern
November	Brigitte Bauer	Irving Penn
December	Editha Dussler	Irving Penn

=== 1967 ===
Issue	Cover model	Photographer
January	Jean Shrimpton	Richard Avedon
February	Sue Murray	Irving Penn
March	Nicole de Lamargé	Guy Bourdin
April	Shirley Ann Hayes	Eric Swayne
May	Twiggy	Bert Stern
June	Marisa Berenson	Norman Parkinson
July/August	Britt Ekland	David Bailey
September	Benedetta Barzini	Peter Knapp
October	Sue Murray	Irving Penn
November	Samantha Jones	Gianni Penati
December	Samantha Jones	Irving Penn

=== 1968 ===
Issue	Cover model	Photographer
January	Tania Mallet	Irving Penn
February	Editha Dussler	Irving Penn
March	Grace Coddington	Marc Hispard
April	Ivana Bastianello	Gian Paolo Barbieri
May	Benedetta Barzini	David Bailey
June	Samantha Jones	Gianni Penati
July/August	Lauren Hutton	Irving Penn
September	Maria Kimberly	Gian Paolo Barbieri
October	Benedetta Barzini	Irving Penn
November	Françoise Rubartelli	Irving Penn
December	Samantha Jones	Richard Avedon

=== 1969 ===
Issue	Cover model	Photographer
January	Agneta Bylander (Mouche)	Susan Wood
February	Penelope Tree	David Bailey
March	Marisa Berenson	David Bailey
April	Moyra Swan	Bert Stern
May	Twiggy	Justin de Villeneuve
June	Berkley Johnson	Richard Avedon
July/August	Pattie Boyd	Justin de Villeneuve
September	Berkley Johnson	Gian Paolo Barbieri
October	Susanne Schöneborn	Irving Penn
November	Moyra Swan	David Bailey
December	Ingrid Boulting	Barry Lategan

== 1970s ==
=== 1970 ===
Issue	Cover model	Photographer
January	Vivienne Lynn	Barry Lategan
February	Jane Hitchcock	Barry Lategan
March	Moyra Swan	Barry Lategan
April	Lynn Kohlman	Barry Lategan
May	Susan Moncur	Chris von Wangenheim
June	Diane Adelson	Barry Lategan
July/August	Nancy Cook	Barry Lategan
September	Birgitta Ramang	Barry Lategan
October	Viviane Fauny	Chris von Wangenheim
November	Susan Moncur	Barry Lategan
December	Louise Despointes	Barry Lategan

=== 1971 ===
Issue	Cover model	Photographer
January	Donna Jordan	Chris von Wangenheim
February	Anjelica Huston	Alfa Castaldi
March	Susan Moncur	Barry Lategan
April	Leslie Jones	Barry Lategan
May	Susan Blakely	Chris von Wangenheim
June	Cathee Dahmen	Barry Lategan
July/August	Carol LaBrie	Chris von Wangenheim
September	Shelley Smith	Chris von Wangenheim
October	Shelley Smith	Chris von Wangenheim
November	Ingmari Lamy	Barry Lategan
December	Christiana Steidten	Chris von Wangenheim

=== 1972 ===
Issue	Cover model	Photographer
January	Lynn Woodruff	Chris von Wangenheim
February	Ann Schaufuss	Alex Chatelain
March	Patricia Dow	Jean-Jacques Bugat
April	Mari	Jean-Jacques Bugat
May	Donna Mitchell	Gian Paolo Barbieri
June	Apollonia van Ravenstein	Gian Paolo Barbieri
July/August	Vivienne Lynn	Gian Paolo Barbieri
September	Cynthia Korman	Otto Stupakoff
October	Paula Klimat (Pola)	Bill Silano
November	Laura Alvarez	Alberto Rizzo
December		Rocco Mancino

=== 1973 ===
Issue	Cover model	Photographer
January	Héloïse	Gianni Penati
February		Barry Lategan
March	Ann Turkel	Gianni Penati
April	Susanne Schöneborn	Kourken Pakchanian
May	Shelley Hack	Gian Paolo Barbieri
June	Jill Kennington	Barry Lategan
July/August	Randi Oakes	Oliviero Toscani
September	Eva Malmström	Barry Lategan
October	Ann Schaufuss	Peter Knapp
October (2)	Barbara Carrera	Alex Chatelain
November	Eva Malmström	Gian Paolo Barbieri
December	Louise Despointes	Gian Paolo Barbieri

=== 1974 ===
Issue	Cover model	Photographer
January	Chantal Stevenart	Peter Knapp
February	Patricia Dow	Peter Knapp
March	Jeanette Christjansen	Gian Paolo Barbieri
March (2)	Debbie Biernacki	Carlo Orsi
April	Carole Singleton	Barry Lategan
May	Gaby Wagner	Gian Paolo Barbieri
June	Christiana Steidten	Gian Paolo Barbieri
July/August	Eva Nielson	Hans Feurer
September	Rene Russo	Francesco Scavullo
September (2)	Rene Russo	Francesco Scavullo
October	Christiana Steidten	Gian Paolo Barbieri
November	Denise Hopkins	David Bailey
December	Rene Russo	Francesco Scavullo

=== 1975 ===
Issue	Cover model	Photographer
January	Nina Gaidarova	David Bailey
February	Jaan Stephens	David Anthony
March	Eva Nielson	Hans Feurer
March (2)	Kristine Silva	Gian Paolo Barbieri
April	Ingmari Lamy	Barry Lategan
May	Vibeke Knudsen	Hans Feurer
June	Dayle Haddon	Gian Paolo Barbieri
July/August	Laura Alvarez	Gian Paolo Barbieri
September	Cheryl Tiegs	Barry Lategan
September (2)	Laura Alvarez	Gian Paolo Barbieri
October	Evelyn	Barry Lategan
November	Marie Helvin	David Bailey
December	Héloïse	Gian Paolo Barbieri

=== 1976 ===
Issue	Cover model	Photographer
January	Vivienne Lynn	Barry Lategan
February	Laura Alvarez	Gian Paolo Barbieri
March	Iman	Norman Parkinson
March (2)	Kirsti Toscani	Barry Lategan
April	Beska Sörenson	Hans Feurer
May	Marie Helvin	David Bailey
June	Anna Andersen	Hans Feurer
July/August	Moyra Swan	David Bailey
September	Debbie Biernacki	Norman Parkinson
September (2)	Yvonne Sporre	Norman Parkinson
October	Sofia Kiukkonen	Renato Grignaschi
November	Margaux Hemingway	David Bailey
December	Vibeke Knudsen	Gian Paolo Barbieri

=== 1977 ===
Issue	Cover model	Photographer
January	Susan Moncur	David Bailey
February	Lilo Zinglersen	François Lamy
March	Winnie Hollman	Gian Paolo Barbieri
March (2)	Polly Eltes	Norman Parkinson
April	Marie Helvin	David Bailey
April (2)	Jan McGill	Barry Lategan
May	Clotilde	François Lamy
June		Marco Emili
July/August	Tree Allen	David Bailey
September	Marie Helvin	David Bailey
September (2)	Clotilde	Renato Grignaschi
October	Lilo Zinglersen	Hans Feurer
October (2)	Alana Stewart	Barry Lategan
November	Shaun Casey	Gian Paolo Barbieri
December	Beverly Johnson	Norman Parkinson

=== 1978 ===
Issue	Cover model	Photographer
January	Mia Nygren	Barry Lategan
February	Gunilla Lindblad	Hans Feurer
March	Kathleen Allen	Barry Lategan
March (2)	Dominique Sanda	François Lamy
April	Eeva Ketola	Hans Feurer
April (2)	Mary Eastwood	Barry Lategan
May	Yolande Gilot	Gian Paolo Barbieri
June	Lena Kansbod	François Lamy
July/August	Kim Harris	David Bailey
September		Barry Lategan
September (2)	Pat Cleveland	François Lamy
October	Beverly Farnworth	Barry Lategan
October (2)	Darlanne Fluegel	David Bailey
November	Laura Alvarez	Gian Paolo Barbieri
December	Dot Jensen; Peter Keating	Hans Feurer

=== 1979 ===
Issue	Cover model	Photographer
January		Hans Feurer
February	Susan Hess	François Lamy
February (2)	Tara Shannon	François Lamy
March	Anna Andersen	Gian Paolo Barbieri
March (2)	Marcie Hunt	Gian Paolo Barbieri
April	Lena Kansbod	François Lamy
April (2)	Tamara Shure	Hans Feurer
May	Eva Wallen	Fabrizio Ferri
June	Michelle Stevens	Arthur Elgort
July/August	Ty Hendrick	Barry Lategan
September	Frauke Quast	Barry Lategan
September (2)	Kim Harris	David Bailey
October	Nancy Donahue	Marco Glaviano
October (2)	Lena Kansbod	François Lamy
November	Eva Nielson	Gian Paolo Barbieri
December	Jerry Hall	Peter Lindbergh

== 1980s ==
=== 1980 ===
Issue	Cover model	Photographer
January	Anna Andersen	Gian Paolo Barbieri
February	Lena Kansbod	François Lamy
February (2)	Amalia Vairelli	Peter Lindbergh
March		Barry Lategan
March (2)	Nancy Donahue	Marco Glaviano
April	Susan Hess	Arthur Elgort
April (2)	Kristian Alfonso	Renato Grignaschi
May	Marcie Hunt	Avi Meroz
June	Marcie Hunt	Gian Paolo Barbieri
July-August	Susan Hess	Arthur Elgort
September	Lisa Ramos	Arthur Elgort
September (2)	Susan Hess	Arthur Elgort
October	Lisa Ryall	Renato Grignaschi
October (2)	Esmé Marshall	Renato Grignaschi
November	Carol Alt	Renato Grignaschi
December	Nancy Decker	Arthur Elgort

=== 1981 ===
Issue	Cover model	Photographer
January	Carol Alt	Renato Grignaschi
February	Juli Foster	Renato Grignaschi
February (2)	Gia Carangi	Renato Grignaschi
March	Carol Alt	Renato Grignaschi
March (2)	Nancy DeWeir	Renato Grignaschi
April	Rosemary McGrotha	Renato Grignaschi
April (2)	Lisan van der Zalm	Barry Lategan
May	Lena Kansbod	Renato Grignaschi
June	Moira O'Brien	Gian Paolo Barbieri
July-August	Dawn Gallagher	Renato Grignaschi
September	Carol Alt	François Lamy
September (2)	Kelly Le Brock	Richard Avedon
October	Rosemary McGrotha	Renato Grignaschi
October (2)	Eva Voorhees	Renato Grignaschi
November	Nancy DeWeir	Renato Grignaschi
December	Kathy Ireland	Peter Lindbergh

=== 1982 ===
Issue	Cover model	Photographer
January	Kim Alexis	Renato Grignaschi
February	Anette Stai	Renato Grignaschi
February (2)	Eva Voorhees	Renato Grignaschi
March	Anette Stai	Renato Grignaschi
March (2)	Lisa Ryall	Renato Grignaschi
April	Kelly Le Brock	David Bailey
April (2)	Jacki Adams	Renato Grignaschi
May	Catharina Ostental	Renato Grignaschi
June	Andie MacDowell	Renato Grignaschi
July-August	Terry Farrell	Bill King
September	Nastassja Kinski	Barry McKinley
September (2)	Anette Stai	Bill King
October	Jinsey Dauk	Bill King
October (2)	Rosemary McGrotha	Bill King
November	Renée Simonsen	Bill King
December	Jacki Adams	Bill King

=== 1983 ===
Issue	Cover model	Photographer
January	Rosemary McGrotha	Bill King
February	Lauren Helm	Bill King
February (2)	Lynne Koester	Bill King
March (Speciale 1)	Terri May	Hiro
March (Speciale 2)	Kim Alexis	Bill King
April	Alexa Singer	Hiro
April (2)	Christie Brinkley	Bruce Weber
May	Terry Farrell	Bill King
June	Lara Harris	Hiro
July-August	Rosemary McGrotha	Hiro
September	Julie Wolfe	Hiro
September (Speciale 3)	Valérie Kaprisky	Bill King
October	Lauren Helm	Hiro
October (Speciale 4)	Jen Yarrow	Hiro
November	Pam Ross	Hiro
December	Yvonne Sporre; Arielle Burgelin	Hiro

=== 1984 ===
Issue	Cover model	Photographer
January	Felicitas Boch	Hiro
February	Anette Stai	Hiro
February (2)	Isabella Rossellini	Hiro
March (Speciale 5)	Renata Vackova	Hiro
March (Speciale 6)	Janice Dickinson	Hiro
April	Alison Cohn	Hiro
April (2)	Lise Brand	Hiro
May	Talisa Soto	Hiro
June	Joan Severance	Hiro
July-August	Bonnie Berman	Hiro
September	Rosie Vela	Hiro
September (Speciale 7)	Felicitas Boch	Hiro
October	Daniela Ghione	Hiro
October (Speciale 8)	Jen Yarrow	Hiro
November	Stella Goodall	Hiro
December	Alison Cohn	Hiro

=== 1985 ===
Issue	Cover model	Photographer
January	Jacki Adams	Hiro
February	Joko Zohrer	Hiro
February (2)	Bine Kjellerup	Hiro
March (Speciale 9)	Daniela Ghione	Hiro
March (Speciale 10)	Susie Bick	Hiro
April	Brigitte Gaultier	Hiro
April (2)	Renata Vackova	Hiro
May	Jen Yarrow	Hiro
June	Pam Ross	Hiro
July-August	Yasmin Le Bon	Hiro
September (Speciale 11)	Daniela Ghione	Hiro
September	Christine Bolster	Hiro
October	Francine Howell	Hiro
October (Speciale 12)	Nathalie Gabrielli	Hiro
November	Gail Elliott	Hiro
December	Andie MacDowell	Hiro

=== 1986 ===
Issue	Cover model	Photographer
January	Yasmeen Ghauri	Hiro
February	Sofia Milos	Hiro
February (2)	Alison Cohn	Hiro
March (Speciale 13)	Christy Turlington	Hiro
March (Speciale 14)	Jose Toledo	Hiro
April	Tatjana Patitz	Hiro
April (2)	Sophia Gondard	Hiro
May	Anette Stai	Hiro
June	Natasha	Hiro
July-August	Estelle Lefébure	Hiro
September	Alison Cohn	Hiro
September (Speciale 15)	Catherine Dryer	Hiro
October	Tatjana Patitz	Hiro
October (Speciale 16)	Lauren Helm	Hiro
November	Charlotte Naunton-Morgan	Hiro
December	Hunter Reno	Hiro

=== 1987 ===
Issue	Cover model	Photographer
January	Betty Lago	Hiro
February	Olatz López Garmendia	Hiro
February (2)	Tamara Bruno	Hiro
March (Speciale 17)	Brynja Sverris	Hiro
March (Speciale 18)	Famke Janssen	Hiro
April	Anna Juvander	Hiro
April (2)	Aly Dunne	Hiro
May	Christy Turlington	Hiro
June	Stephanie Seymour	Hiro
July-August	Steevie van der Veen	Hiro
September	Elena Vannucci	Hiro
September (Speciale 19)	Roberta Chirko	Hiro
October	Susie Bick	Steven Klein
October (Speciale 20)	Nathalie Gabrielli	Hiro
November		Hiro
December	Julia	Steven Klein

=== 1988 ===
Issue	Cover model	Photographer
January	Christy Turlington	David Bailey
February	Yasmin Le Bon	Steven Klein
February (2)	Elaine Irwin	Steven Klein
March (Speciale 21)	Monica Gripman	Steven Klein
March (Speciale 22)	Steevie van der Veen	Steven Klein
April	Yasmin Le Bon	Albert Watson
April (2)	Michelle Quan	Steven Klein
May	Alexandra Aubin	Steven Klein
June	Naomi Campbell	Steven Klein
July-August	Robin MacKintosh	Steven Meisel
September	Rachel Hunter	Steven Meisel
September (Speciale 23)	Elena Kountoura	Satoshi Saïkusa; Mats Gustafson
October (Speciale 24)	Michaela Bercu	Steven Meisel
November	Michaela Bercu	Steven Meisel
December	Veruschka von Lehndorff; Lauren Hutton; Isabella Rossellini	Steven Meisel

=== 1989 ===
Issue	Cover model	Photographer
January	Rosemary McGrotha	Steven Meisel
February	Linda Evangelista	Steven Meisel
February (2)	Cindy Crawford	Patrick Demarchelier
March (Speciale 25)	Kara Young	Satoshi Saïkusa
March (Speciale 26)	Dana Patrick	Steven Meisel
April	Rachel Williams	Steven Meisel
May	Veronica Webb	Albert Watson
June	Rachel Williams	Steven Meisel
July-August	Michaela Bercu	Albert Watson
September	Isabella Rossellini	Steven Meisel
September (Speciale 27)	Sonia Schnetzer	Satoshi Saïkusa; Mats Gustavson
October (Speciale 28)	Christy Turlington	Steven Meisel
November	Linda Evangelista	Steven Meisel
December	Linda Evangelista; Naomi Campbell; Christy Turlington	Steven Meisel

== 1990s ==
=== 1990 ===
Issue	Cover model	Photographer
January	Wallis Franken	Steven Meisel
February	Linda Evangelista	Steven Meisel
February (2)	Linda Evangelista	Steven Meisel
March (Speciale 29)	Capucine	Albert Watson
March (Speciale 30)	Claudia Schiffer	Steven Meisel
April	Kim Williams	Steven Meisel
May	Roberta Chirko	Steven Meisel
June	Linda Evangelista	Steven Meisel
July-August	Naomi Campbell	Steven Meisel
September	Isabella Rossellini	Steven Meisel
September (Speciale 31)		Mats Gustafson
October (Speciale 32)	Liza Minnelli	Steven Meisel
November	Christy Turlington	Steven Meisel
December	Editha Dussler	Steven Meisel

=== 1991 ===
Issue	Cover model	Photographer
January	Yasmeen Ghauri	Steven Meisel
February	Madonna	Steven Meisel
March	Christy Turlington	Steven Meisel
April	Teresa Stewart	Steven Meisel
May	Linda Evangelista	Steven Meisel
June	Linda Evangelista	Steven Meisel
July	Susan Holmes; Donna Mitchell; Wallis Franken; Andrew Richardson	Steven Meisel
August	Linda Evangelista	Steven Meisel
September	Linda Evangelista	Steven Meisel
October	Shana Zadrick	Steven Meisel
November	Barbara Moors; Sonja Rasch; Catherine McCord; Shana Zadrick; Nicole Beach; Meghan Douglas; Jane Powers	Steven Meisel
December	Shana Zadrick	Steven Meisel

=== 1992 ===
Issue	Cover model	Photographer
January	Meghan Douglas	Steven Meisel
February	Isabella Rossellini	Steven Meisel
March	Magali Amadei	Steven Meisel
April	Wallis Franken; Jane Hitchcock; Susan Forristal	Steven Meisel
May	Kristen McMenamy	Steven Meisel
June	Meghan Douglas	Steven Meisel
July	Nadja Auermann	Steven Meisel
August	Rosie Vela; Tasha de Vasconcelos	Steven Meisel
September	Linda Evangelista	Steven Meisel
October	Lucie de la Falaise	Steven Meisel
November	Madonna	Steven Meisel
December	Sofia Coppola	Steven Meisel

=== 1993 ===
Issue	Cover model	Photographer
January	Patti Hansen	Steven Meisel
February	Camilla Nickerson	Steven Meisel
March	Linda Evangelista	Steven Meisel
April	Twiggy	Steven Meisel
May	Linda Evangelista; Naomi Campbell; Christy Turlington; Amber Valletta; Shalom Harlow; Nadja Auermann; Kristen McMenamy	Steven Meisel
June	Bridget Hall	Steven Meisel
July	Shalom Harlow	Steven Meisel
August	Kristen McMenamy	Steven Meisel
September	Jaime Rishar	Steven Meisel
October	Jaime Rishar	Steven Meisel
November	Bridget Hall	Steven Meisel
December	Lauren Hutton; Gabriel Hill; Christian William; Brett King; Thomas Magiar	Steven Meisel

=== 1994 ===
Issue	Cover model	Photographer
January	Linda Evangelista	Steven Meisel
February	Claudia Schiffer	Steven Meisel
March	Bridget Hall	Steven Meisel
April	Beverly Peele	Steven Meisel
May	Veruschka	Steven Meisel
June	Niki Taylor	Steven Meisel
July	Nadja Auermann	Steven Meisel
August	Kirsty Hume	Steven Meisel
September	Kirsty Hume	Steven Meisel
October 1994	Ali MacGraw; Ann Turkel; Bridget Hall; Carla Bruni; Chessy Rayner; Christy Turlington; Claudia Schiffer; Donna Mitchell; Isabella Rossellini; Jaime Rishar; Jane Hitchcock; Kate Moss; Kirsty Hume; Kristen McMenamy; Lauren Hutton; Linda Evangelista; Lucie de la Falaise; Marisa Berenson; Meghan Douglas; Nadja Auermann; Naomi Campbell; Nina Griscom; Patti Hansen; Peggy Moffitt; Rachel Williams; Shalom Harlow; Sofia Coppola; Stella Tennant; Susan Forristal; Trish Goff; Veruschka	Steven Meisel
November	Linda Evangelista	Steven Meisel
December	Kristen McMenamy	Steven Meisel

=== 1995 ===
Issue	Cover model	Photographer
January	Kristen McMenamy	Steven Meisel
February	Michelle Behennah	Steven Meisel
March	Trish Goff; Amber Valletta	Steven Meisel
April	Laurie Bird	Steven Meisel
May	Bijou Phillips	Steven Meisel
June	Kristen McMenamy	Steven Meisel
July	Linda Evangelista	Steven Meisel
August	Amber Valletta	Steven Meisel
September	Amber Valletta	Steven Meisel
October	Michele Hicks	Steven Meisel
November	Guinevere Van Seenus	Steven Meisel
December	Stella Tennant	Steven Meisel

=== 1996 ===
Issue	Cover model	Photographer
January	Amber Valletta	Steven Meisel
February	Stella Tennant	Steven Meisel
March	Kate Moss	Steven Meisel
April	Elsa Benítez	Steven Meisel
May	Esther de Jong; Jeremy Boesmans	Steven Meisel
June	Esther de Jong; Shirley Mallmann	Steven Meisel
July	Kylie Bax	Steven Meisel
August	Elsa Benítez	Steven Meisel
September	Elsa Benítez	Steven Meisel
October	Guinevere Van Seenus; Carolyn Murphy	Steven Meisel
November	Guinevere Van Seenus	Steven Meisel
December	Amy Wesson	Steven Meisel

=== 1997 ===
Issue	Cover model	Photographer
January	Amy Wesson	Steven Meisel
February	Karen Elson	Steven Meisel
March	Amber Valletta; Naomi Campbell; Kristen McMenamy; Karen Elson; Johnny Zander; Vincent Gallo	Steven Meisel
April	Courtney Love	Steven Meisel
May	Audrey Marnay	Steven Meisel
June	Angela Lindvall; Scott Barnhill; Chris Kramer; Thorsten Larsen	Steven Meisel
July	Danielle Zinaich; Scott Barnhill	Steven Meisel
August	Amy Lemons	Steven Meisel
September	Kirsten Owen	Steven Meisel
October	Chandra North; Colin Egglesfield; Mischa Barton	Steven Meisel
November	Sunniva Stordahl	Steven Meisel
December	Nicole Anderson	Steven Meisel

=== 1998 ===
Issue	Cover model	Photographer
January	Erin O'Connor	Steven Meisel
February	Maggie Rizer; Elsa Benítez; Eugenia Silva	Steven Meisel
March	Eugenia Silva	Steven Meisel
April	Heather Stohler; Thosi Wedlich	Steven Meisel
May	Eva Strus	Steven Meisel
June	Maggie Rizer	Steven Meisel
July	Elizabeth Peyton	Steven Meisel
August	Oluchi Onweagba	Steven Meisel
September	Carolyn Murphy	Steven Meisel
October	Erin O'Connor; Jade Parfitt; Audrey Marnay; Maggie Rizer; Audrey Tchekova; Karen Elson	Steven Meisel
November	Emily Sandberg; Kevin Merkel	Steven Meisel
December	Inge Geurts; Geert De Mot	Steven Meisel

=== 1999 ===
Issue	Cover model	Photographer
January	Frankie Rayder	Steven Meisel
February	Karen Elson	Steven Meisel
March	Małgosia Bela; Maggie Rizer	Steven Meisel
April	Sunniva Stordahl	Steven Meisel
May	Amber Valletta	Steven Meisel
June	Gisele Bündchen; André Resende	Steven Meisel
July	Juliet Elliott	Steven Meisel
August	Madeleine Norling	Steven Meisel
September	Mary Anne Fletcher; Anastasia Khozisova; Juliet Elliott; Uncredited	Steven Meisel
October	Jacquetta Wheeler	Steven Meisel
November	Lisa Taylor	Steven Meisel
December	Caroline Ribeiro	Steven Meisel

== 2000s ==
=== 2000 ===
Issue	Cover model	Photographer
January	Audrey Marnay; Maggie Rizer; Danita Angell; Ana Cláudia Michels; Caroline Ribeiro; Karen Elson	Steven Meisel
February	Sophie Dahl	Steven Meisel
March	Hannelore Knuts	Steven Meisel
April	Sophie Dahl; Damien Van Zyl	Steven Meisel
May	Amanda Moore	Steven Meisel
June	Małgosia Bela	Steven Meisel
July	Hannelore Knuts	Steven Meisel
August	Anouck Lepere; Raquel Zimmermann; Raica Oliveira; Angie Schmidt; Alexandra Sjöstedt	Steven Meisel
September	Natasa Livak; Raquel Zimmermann	Steven Meisel
October	Charlotte Gainsbourg	Steven Meisel
November	Kim Peers	Steven Meisel
December	Eleonora Bosé	Steven Meisel

=== 2001 ===
Issue	Cover model	Photographer
January	Kim Peers	Steven Meisel
February	Liisa Winkler	Steven Meisel
March	Hannelore Knuts; Christina Kruse; Kim Peers; An Oost; Trish Goff; Jacquetta Wheeler	Steven Meisel
April	Hannelore Knuts	Steven Meisel
May	Vicky Andren	Steven Meisel
June	Diána Mészáros	Steven Meisel
July	Karolína Kurková	Steven Meisel
August	Gisele Bündchen; Matt Duffie	Steven Meisel
September	Marisa Berenson; Liliana Domínguez; Justine Bakker; Luciano Cassin	Steven Meisel
October	Amber Valletta	Steven Meisel
November	Naomi Campbell	Steven Meisel
December	Kristina Chrastekova	Steven Meisel

=== 2002 ===
Issue	Cover model	Photographer
January	Carmen Kass; Anne-Catherine Lacroix; Amanda Moore; Bridget Hall	Steven Meisel
February	Eva Jay Kubatova	Steven Meisel
March	Anne-Catherine Lacroix	Steven Meisel
April	Eugenia Volodina	Steven Meisel
May	Michelle Alves	Steven Meisel
June	Raquel Zimmermann	Steven Meisel
July	Carolyn Murphy; Ryan Burns; Scott Nelson	Steven Meisel
August	Selma Blair	Steven Meisel
September	Emily Sandberg	Steven Meisel
October	Liya Kebede	Steven Meisel
November	Missy Rayder	Steven Meisel
December	Natalia Vodianova	Steven Meisel

=== 2003 ===
Issue	Cover model	Photographer
January	Élise Crombez	Steven Meisel
February	Linda Evangelista	Steven Meisel
March	Stella Tennant	Steven Meisel
April	Audrey Marnay	Steven Meisel
May	Élise Crombez	Steven Meisel
June	Julia Stegner	Steven Meisel
July	Daria Werbowy; Élise Crombez; Julia Stegner	Steven Meisel
August	Daria Werbowy	Steven Meisel
September	Jessica Stam	Steven Meisel
October	Daria Werbowy	Steven Meisel
November	Jessica Stam; Missy Rayder	Steven Meisel
December	Rianne ten Haken	Steven Meisel

=== 2004 ===
Issue	Cover model	Photographer
January	Missy Rayder	Steven Meisel
February	Lisa Cant; Justin Vaughn	Steven Meisel
March	Lisa Cant	Steven Meisel
April	Lydia Hearst	Steven Meisel
May	Daria Werbowy	Steven Meisel
June	Karen Elson	Steven Meisel
July	Missy Rayder; Karen Elson; Hannelore Knuts; Élise Crombez; Jessica Stam; Dovile Virsilaite	Steven Meisel
August	Jessica Stam	Steven Meisel
September	Élise Crombez	Steven Meisel
October	Élise Crombez	Steven Meisel
November	Hana Soukupová	Steven Meisel
December	Karen Elson	Steven Meisel

=== 2005 ===
Issue	Cover model	Photographer
January	Missy Rayder; Hannelore Knuts; Shannan Click; Caroline Trentini; Julia Stegner; Frank Brown; Gaspar Dietrich	Steven Meisel
February	Doutzen Kroes	Steven Meisel
March	Lily Donaldson	Steven Meisel
April	Gemma Ward	Steven Meisel
May	Natalia Vodianova	Steven Meisel
June	Carolyn Murphy	Steven Meisel
July	Linda Evangelista	Steven Meisel
August	Snejana Onopka	Steven Meisel
September	Lily Donaldson	Steven Meisel
October	Karen Elson	Steven Meisel
November	Snejana Onopka	Steven Meisel
December	Sasha Pivovarova	Steven Meisel

=== 2006 ===
Issue	Cover model	Photographer
January	Irina Lăzăreanu; Jarrod Branch; Jonathan Kroppmann	Steven Meisel
February	Heather Bratton	Steven Meisel
March	Amanda Moore	Steven Meisel
April	Coco Rocha	Steven Meisel
May	Heather Bratton	Steven Meisel
June	Hilary Rhoda	Steven Meisel
July	Anna Mariya Urajevskaya	Steven Meisel
August	Iselin Steiro; Nataša Vojnović	Steven Meisel
September	Hilary Rhoda	Steven Meisel
October	Nicole Richie	Steven Meisel
November	Agyness Deyn	Steven Meisel
December	Karen Elson	Steven Meisel

=== 2007 ===
Issue	Cover model	Photographer
January	Sasha Pivovarova; Missy Rayder; Nate Nesbitt	Steven Meisel
February	Hilary Rhoda; Coco Rocha	Steven Meisel
March	Sasha Pivovarova	Steven Meisel
April	Karen Elson	Steven Meisel
May	Gemma Ward	Steven Meisel
June	Adina Fohlin	Steven Meisel
July	Denisa Dvořáková	Steven Meisel
August	Magdalena Frackowiak; Maryna Linchuk	Steven Meisel
September	Agyness Deyn; Blaine Cook; Chad Dunn; Rodrigo Calazans; Nate Nesbitt	Steven Meisel
October	Meghan Collison	Steven Meisel
November	Coco Rocha; Meghan Collison	Steven Meisel
December	Lara Stone	Steven Meisel

=== 2008 ===
Issue	Cover model	Photographer
January	Guinevere Van Seenus	Steven Meisel
February	Agnete Hegelund; Kamila Filipcikova	Steven Meisel
March	Kamila Filipcikova	Steven Meisel
April	Natalia Vodianova	Steven Meisel
May	Eva Mendes	Steven Meisel
June	Linda Evangelista	Steven Meisel
July	Jourdan Dunn; Liya Kebede; Naomi Campbell; Sessilee Lopez	Steven Meisel
August	Guinevere Van Seenus; Mark Vanderloo; Johnny Zander; Linda Evangelista; Karen Elson; Nico Malleville; Willy van Rooy; Iris Strubegger	Steven Meisel
September	Viktoriya Sasonkina	Steven Meisel
October	Anna Jagodzińska	Steven Meisel
November	Katrin Thormann; Toni Garrn	Steven Meisel
December	Katrin Thormann	Steven Meisel

=== 2009 ===
Issue	Cover model	Photographer
January	Anna Selezneva; Anna Jagodzińska; Viktoriya Sasonkina	Steven Meisel
February	Pixie Geldof	Steven Meisel
March	Hanne Gaby Odiele; Kinga Rajzak	Steven Meisel
April	Eliza Cummings	Steven Meisel
May	Sasha Pivovarova	Steven Meisel
June	Meghan Collison; Daniel Hicks	Steven Meisel
July	Kristen McMenamy	Steven Meisel
August	Linda Evangelista	Steven Meisel
September	Sasha Pivovarova; Ash Stymest; Anna Jagodzińska; Max Rogers; Will Lewis; Jamie Bochert; Christian Brylle	Steven Meisel
October	Rianne ten Haken; Karlie Kloss	Steven Meisel
November	Rianne ten Haken	Steven Meisel
December	Christy Turlington; Lara Stone; Gisele Bündchen; Kasia Struss; Natalia Vodianova	Steven Meisel

== 2010s ==
=== 2010 ===
Issue	Cover model	Photographer
January	Karlie Kloss	Steven Meisel
February	Jamie Bochert; Daphne Guinness; Agyness Deyn	Steven Meisel
March	Freja Beha Erichsen	Steven Meisel
April	Amber Valletta	Steven Meisel
May	Kirsi Pyrhonen; Daria Strokous	Steven Meisel
June	Eva Herzigová	Steven Meisel
July	Christy Turlington	Steven Meisel
August	Kristen McMenamy	Steven Meisel
September	Miranda Kerr	Steven Meisel
October	Mariacarla Boscono	Steven Meisel
November	Freja Beha Erichsen; Iselin Steiro	Steven Meisel
December	Gisele Bündchen	Steven Meisel

=== 2011 ===
Issue	Cover model	Photographer
January	Freja Beha Erichsen; Arizona Muse	Steven Meisel
February	Candice Swanepoel	Steven Meisel
March	Saskia de Brauw	Steven Meisel
April	Kristina Salinovic	Steven Meisel
May	Kristen McMenamy	Steven Meisel
June	Candice Huffine; Tara Lynn; Robyn Lawley	Steven Meisel
July	Juliane Grüner	Steven Meisel
August	Raquel Zimmermann	Steven Meisel
September	Stella Tennant	Steven Meisel
October	Karen Elson	Steven Meisel
November	Raquel Zimmermann	Steven Meisel
December	Karlie Kloss	Steven Meisel

=== 2012 ===
Issue	Cover model	Photographer
January	Daria Strokous; Caroline Trentini; Paula Patrice	Steven Meisel
February	Laura Kampman	Steven Meisel
March	Joan Smalls	Steven Meisel
April	Chrystal Copland; Sojourner Morrell; Thairine Garcia; Aaron Vernon; Ethan James Green; Lyle Lodwick	Steven Meisel
May	Linda Evangelista	Steven Meisel
June	Isabella Rossellini	Steven Meisel
July	Vanessa Axente; Mackenzie Drazan; Julia Nobis; Elena Bartels; Lida Fox; Erjona Ala	Steven Meisel
August	Jamie Bochert	Steven Meisel
September	Carolyn Murphy	Steven Meisel
October	Meghan Collison	Steven Meisel
November	Kate Upton	Steven Meisel
December	Vanessa Axente; Marlon Teixeira	Steven Meisel

=== 2013 ===
Issue	Cover model	Photographer
January	Fei Fei Sun	Steven Meisel
February	Naomi Campbell	Steven Meisel
March	Vanessa Axente; Gustav Swedberg	Steven Meisel
April	Edie Campbell	Steven Meisel
May	Karen Elson; Edie Campbell	Steven Meisel
June	Gisele Bündchen	Steven Meisel
July	Natalia Vodianova; Gisele Bündchen; Tony Ward; Linda Evangelista; John Pearson; RJ King; Stella Tennant; Peter Marino; Raquel Zimmermann; Dorian Reeves; Amanda Murphy; Ethan James Green; Meghan Collison; Frederik Meijnen; Cameron Russell; Louis Steyaert	Steven Meisel
August	Amanda Murphy	Steven Meisel
September	Doutzen Kroes	Steven Meisel
October	Edie Campbell	Steven Meisel
November	Ashleigh Good	Steven Meisel
December	Anna Ewers; Ophélie Guillermand; Cindy Bruna; Gracie Van Gastel	Steven Meisel

=== 2014 ===
Issue	Cover model	Photographer
January	Julia Nobis	Steven Meisel
February	Sofia Coppola	Steven Meisel
March	Saskia de Brauw	Steven Meisel
April	Issa Lish; Bernd Sassmanshausen	Steven Meisel
May	Lexi Boling	Steven Meisel
June	Adriana Lima	Steven Meisel
July	Amanda Murphy; Edie Campbell; Lexi Boling; RJ King; David Alexander Flinn; Cameron Keesling; Vanessa Moody; Julia Nobis; Geron McKinley; Meghan Collison; Tobey Hayduk	Steven Meisel
August	Isabeli Fontana; Timo Nuñez	Steven Meisel
September	Naomi Campbell; Carolyn Murphy; Raquel Zimmermann; Christy Turlington; Amber Valletta; Linda Evangelista; Karen Elson; Natalia Vodianova; Edie Campbell; Stella Tennant; Jamie Bochert; Vanessa Moody; Mariacarla Boscono; Daria Strokous; Issa Lish; Iselin Steiro; Liya Kebede; Julia Nobis; Meghan Collison; Lexi Boling; Jessica Stam; Saskia de Brauw; Vanessa Axente; Aymeline Valade; Anais Mali; Coco Rocha; Fei Fei Sun; Natasha Poly; Sasha Pivovarova; Rianne van Rompaey; Ophélie Guillermand; Hilary Rhoda; Guinevere Van Seenus; Karlie Kloss; Julia Stegner; Miranda Kerr; Cindy Bruna; Élise Crombez; Jourdan Dunn; Liu Wen; Isabeli Fontana; Amanda Murphy; Joan Smalls; Candice Huffine; Anna Ewers; Cameron Russell; Sasha Luss; Candice Swanepoel; Caroline Trentini; Adriana Lima	Steven Meisel
October	Karlie Kloss; Lexi Boling; Sasha Pivovarova	Steven Meisel
November	Carolyn Murphy	Steven Meisel
December	Valerija Kelava; Jamie Bochert	Steven Meisel

=== 2015 ===
Issue	Cover model	Photographer
January	Hollie-May Saker	Steven Meisel
February	Lexi Boling	Steven Meisel
March	Mia Goth	Steven Meisel
April	Karen Elson; Christopher Niquet	Steven Meisel
May	Kayla Scott	Steven Meisel
June	Fei Fei Sun	Mert & Marcus
June	Fernanda Ly; Gia Tang; Jing Wen	Mario Sorrenti
June	Xiao Wen Ju	Steven Klein
June	Yuan Bo Chao	Craig McDean
July	Anna Cleveland; Bambi; Chandrika Casali; Donna Jordan; Erin O'Connor; Frankie Rayder; Hailey Gates; Jan de Villeneuve; Maddison Brown; Mariel Hemingway; Sasha Pivovarova; Stockard Channing; Verde Visconti; Yasmin Warsame	Steven Meisel
August	Mariacarla Boscono	Vincent van de Wijngaard
September	Lexi Boling; Maartje Verhoef	Steven Meisel
October	Estella Boersma; Lily Stewart; Lucas Jayden Satherly	Mert & Marcus
November	Gigi Hadid	Steven Meisel
December	Adwoa Aboah; Edie Campbell; Jamie Bochert; Erin O'Connor; Christina Carey; Anna Cleveland; Karen Elson; Kate Moss	Tim Walker

=== 2016 ===
Issue	Cover model	Photographer
January	Julia Garner	Steven Meisel
February	Kate Moss	Mario Testino
March	Rianne van Rompaey	Steven Meisel
April	Gigi Hadid; Liya Kebede; Imaan Hammam	Patrick Demarchelier
April	Kenza Fourati; Samantha Ellsworth; Pooja Mor; Elisa Sednaoui	Peter Lindbergh
April	Ajak Deng; Mica Argañaraz; Zahara Davis; Anoushka Sharma	Bruce Weber
May	Caitie Greene	Steven Meisel
June	Kate Moss; Lila Moss	Mario Sorrenti
June	Edie Campbell; Olympia Campbell	Mario Sorrenti
June	Gray Sorrenti; Mary Sorrenti; Arsun Sorrenti	Mario Sorrenti
June	Mia Isis; Sasha Pivovarova	Mario Sorrenti
June	Paul van Ravenstein; Noel van Ravenstein; Anna Cleveland; Pat Cleveland	Mario Sorrenti
July	Vittoria Ceretti	Steven Meisel
August	Lara Stone; Andres Sanjuan Villanueva	Steven Klein
September	Bella Hadid; Frederikke Sofie; Kiki Willems; Lulu Tenney	Steven Meisel
October	Isabeli Fontana; Carolyn Murphy; Milla Jovovich; Liu Wen; Lara Stone; Karen Elson; Helena Christensen; Karen Alexander; Tatjana Patitz	Peter Lindbergh
November	Alicia Burke; Hussein Abdulrahman	Steven Meisel
December	Lady Jean Campbell; Sasha Lane; Carson Aldridge; Chase Finlay; Saoirse Stanley	Bruce Weber

=== 2017 ===
Issue	Cover model	Photographer
January	Estella Boersma; Jaden Smith	Bruce Weber
February	Madonna	Steven Klein
March	Lulu Tenney	Steven Meisel
April	Sara Grace Wallerstedt; Ansley Gulielmi; Cara Taylor	Mert & Marcus
May	Anna Ewers; David Friend	Mario Sorrenti
June	Bella Hadid	Inez & Vinoodh
July	Grace Elizabeth; Garrett Neff	Steven Meisel
August	Lara Stone	Harley Weir
September	Mariacarla Boscono; Federico Spinas; Lily Aldridge; Vittoria Ceretti; Pablo Rousson; Edoardo Velicskov	Mert & Marcus
September	Mariacarla Boscono; Saskia de Brauw; Othilia Simon	Inez & Vinoodh
September	Mariacarla Boscono	Willy Vanderperre
October	Diego Villarreal; Lauren Hutton; Nataša Vojnović	Steven Klein
November	Raquel Zimmermann	Inez & Vinoodh
December	Natalia Vodianova; Joan Smalls; Anja Rubik; Catherine McNeil; Jamie Bochert; Irina Shayk	Mert & Marcus

=== 2018 ===
Issue	Cover model	Photographer
January	Fran Summers	Craig McDean
February	Gisele Bündchen	Jamie Hawkesworth
March	Remington Williams	Steven Meisel
April	Adut Akech; Amandine Renard; Birgit Kos	Mert & Marcus
May	Gigi Hadid; Justin Martin	Steven Klein
June	Doutzen Kroes; Mica Argañaraz; Rianne van Rompaey	Willy Vanderperre
July	Kaia Gerber	Craig McDean
August	Madonna	Mert & Marcus
September	Vittoria Ceretti; Saskia de Brauw; Guinevere van Seenus	Mert & Marcus
September	Vittoria Ceretti	Inez & Vinoodh
September	Vittoria Ceretti; Daan Duez; Fernando Albaladejo	Willy Vanderperre
October	Carla Bruni	Giampaolo Sgura
October	Gisele Bündchen	Luigi & Iango
October	Mariacarla Boscono	Dario Catellani
November	Freja Beha Erichsen	Ethan James Green
December	Shalom Harlow	Inez & Vinoodh

=== 2019 ===
Issue	Cover model	Photographer
January	Rebecca Leigh Longendyke	Craig McDean
February	Kendall Jenner	Mert & Marcus
March	Amber Valletta	Mert & Marcus
March	Karl Lagerfeld (In memoriam)	Inez & Vinoodh
April	Rianne van Rompaey	Karim Sadli
May	Anok Yai	Steven Klein
June	Lana Del Rey	Steven Klein
July	Gigi Hadid	Alasdair McLellan
July	Imaan Hammam	Theo Sion
July	Karen Elson	Harley Weir
August	Claudia Schiffer; Stephanie Seymour	Collier Schorr
September	Vilma Sjöberg	Mert & Marcus
September	Adut Akech	Paolo Roversi
October	Jaden Smith; Willow Smith	Hugo Comte
November	Florence Hutchings	David Sims
December	Rebecca Leigh Longendyke (Background: Yasmin El Yassini; Mino Sassy; Nadja Auermann; Meghan Roche; Ernie Blocksage; Perry Finneran)	Mert & Marcus

== 2020s ==
=== 2020 ===
Issue	Cover model	Photographer/Artist
January	—N/a	Vanessa Beecroft
January	Assa Baradji	Delphine Desane
January	Felice Noordhoff	Paolo Ventura
January	Lili Sumner	David Salle
January	Olivia Vinten	Milo Manara
January	Lindsey Wixson	Yoshitaka Amano
January	Ambar Cristal Zarzuela	Cassi Namoda
February	Vittoria Ceretti	Oliver Hadlee Pearch
February	Maty Fall Diba	Paolo Roversi
March	Ida	Mert & Marcus
April	—N/a	—N/a
May	Freja Beha Erichsen	Alasdair McLellan
May	Kaia Gerber	Karim Sadli
May	Grimes	Ryan McGinley
May	Anja Rubik	Harley Weir
June	—N/a	Camilla C.
June	—N/a	Tadzio D.M.
June	—N/a	Giorgio P.
June	—N/a	Pietro R.
June	—N/a	Nori T.
June	—N/a	Rachele T.
June	—N/a	Violetta T.
June	—N/a	Thomas W.
July/August	Binx Walton	Ethan James Green
September	Ugbad Abdi	Mark Borthwick
September	Akon Adichol	Mark Borthwick
September	Adesuwa Aighewi	Mark Borthwick
September	Madeline Allen	Mark Borthwick
September	Angeer Amol	Mark Borthwick
September	Kai Avent-deLeon	Mark Borthwick
September	Zazie Beetz	Mark Borthwick
September	Munaiya Bilal	Mark Borthwick
September	Sara Blomqvist	Mark Borthwick
September	Lexi Boling	Mark Borthwick
September	Saskia de Brauw	Mark Borthwick
September	Naomie Broquet	Mark Borthwick
September	Abby Champion	Mark Borthwick
September	Asia Chow	Mark Borthwick
September	Susan Cianciolo	Mark Borthwick
September	Pat Cleveland	Mark Borthwick
September	Meghan Collison	Mark Borthwick
September	Giannie Couji	Mark Borthwick
September	Cindy Crawford	Mark Borthwick
September	Anisa Dagher	Mark Borthwick
September	Delphine Desane	Mark Borthwick
September	Agyness Deyn	Mark Borthwick
September	Dom' Dominique Duroseau	Mark Borthwick
September	Paloma Elsesser	Mark Borthwick
September	Freja Beha Erichsen	Mark Borthwick
September	Ash Foo	Mark Borthwick
September	Beatrice Galilee	Mark Borthwick
September	Kaia Gerber	Mark Borthwick
September	Trish Goff	Mark Borthwick
September	Bella Hadid	Mark Borthwick
September	Diana al-Hadid	Mark Borthwick
September	Patti Hansen	Mark Borthwick
September	Bethann Hardison	Mark Borthwick
September	Gisue Hariri	Mark Borthwick
September	Donna Jordan	Mark Borthwick
September	Xiao Wen Ju	Mark Borthwick
September	Kiki Layne	Mark Borthwick
September	Precious Lee	Mark Borthwick
September	Rebecca Leigh Longendyke	Mark Borthwick
September	Lacey Lennon	Mark Borthwick
September	Loren Lenox	Mark Borthwick
September	Havana Liu	Mark Borthwick
September	Dede Mansro	Mark Borthwick
September	Carly Mark	Mark Borthwick
September	Hiandra Martinez	Mark Borthwick
September	Jade Meehan	Mark Borthwick
September	Emily Miller	Mark Borthwick
September	June Miller	Mark Borthwick
September	Juno Mitchell	Mark Borthwick
September	Maria Mocerino	Mark Borthwick
September	Indya Moore	Mark Borthwick
September	Lineisy Montero	Mark Borthwick
September	Cassi Namoda	Mark Borthwick
September	Haley Nichols	Mark Borthwick
September	Ariel Nicholson	Mark Borthwick
September	Sam Nïxon	Mark Borthwick
September	Julia Nobis	Mark Borthwick
September	Elaine Palacios	Mark Borthwick
September	Soo Joo Park	Mark Borthwick
September	Jake Junkin	Mark Borthwick
September	Benzo Perryman	Mark Borthwick
September	Elizabeth Peyton	Mark Borthwick
September	Sasha Pivovarova	Mark Borthwick
September	Efna Plaza-Merritt	Mark Borthwick
September	Kyla Ramsey	Mark Borthwick
September	Emily Ratajkowski	Mark Borthwick
September	Missy Rayder	Mark Borthwick
September	Rachel Rose	Mark Borthwick
September	Ajani Russell	Mark Borthwick
September	Cameron Russell	Mark Borthwick
September	Talia Ryder	Mark Borthwick
September	Tafv Sampson	Mark Borthwick
September	Carolina Sarria	Mark Borthwick
September	Valerie Scherzinger	Mark Borthwick
September	Tschabalala Self	Mark Borthwick
September	Yulu Serao	Mark Borthwick
September	Vineeta Seshasai Maruri	Mark Borthwick
September	Chloë Sevigny	Mark Borthwick
September	Irina Shayk	Mark Borthwick
September	Zora Sicher	Mark Borthwick
September	Avery Singer	Mark Borthwick
September	Ming Smith	Mark Borthwick
September	Toni Smith	Mark Borthwick
September	Debra Solomon	Mark Borthwick
September	Gray Sorrenti	Mark Borthwick
September	Lili Sumner	Mark Borthwick
September	Cici Tamez	Mark Borthwick
September	Cara Taylor	Mark Borthwick
September	Laurel Taylor	Mark Borthwick
September	Lulu Tenney	Mark Borthwick
September	Varsha Thapa	Mark Borthwick
September	Tara Thomas	Mark Borthwick
September	Kita Updike	Mark Borthwick
September	Guinevere Van Seenus	Mark Borthwick
September	Heaven Walston	Mark Borthwick
September	Binx Walton	Mark Borthwick
September	Alek Wek	Mark Borthwick
September	Denali White Elk	Mark Borthwick
September	Karen Wong	Mark Borthwick
September	Raquel Zimmermann	Mark Borthwick
October	Justin Bieber; Hailey Bieber	Eli Russell Linnetz
November	Alex Andrews	David Sims
November	Georgia Palmer	David Sims
December	Lila Moss	David Sims

=== 2021 ===
Issue	Cover model	Photographer/Artist
January	Sofia Hansson	Johnny Dufort
January	Ifrah Qaasim	Heji Shin
February	Lavinia De Alessandri	Carlos Nazario
February	Meron Kidane	Carlos Nazario
March	Binx Walton; Saskia de Brauw; Adut Akech; Tao Okamoto; Sasha Pivovarova; Julia Nobis	Craig McDean
April	Adwoa Aboah	James Barnor
April	Selena Forrest; Binx Walton	Miranda Barnes
April	Stella Jones	David Sims
April	Malika Louback; Amar Akway; Skarla Ali	Malick Bodian
April	Demi Moore	Brett Lloyd
April	Natalia Vodianova	Paolo Roversi
May	Amar Akway; Caren Jepkemei	Oliver Hadlee Pearch
May	Loli Bahia	Oliver Hadlee Pearch
May	Sora Choi	Oliver Hadlee Pearch
May	Maty Fall Diba	Oliver Hadlee Pearch
May	Quinn Elin Mora	Oliver Hadlee Pearch
May	Anna Ewers	Oliver Hadlee Pearch
May	Selena Forrest	Oliver Hadlee Pearch
May	Grace Hartzel	Oliver Hadlee Pearch
May	Greta Hofer	Oliver Hadlee Pearch
May	Jill Kortleve	Oliver Hadlee Pearch
May	Rebecca Leigh Longendyke	Oliver Hadlee Pearch
May	Miriam Sánchez	Oliver Hadlee Pearch
June	Rihanna	Rihanna
July	Monica Bellucci; Deva Cassel	Paolo Roversi
August	Mona Tougaard	Colin Dodgson
September	Emma Cline; Ottessa Moshfegh	Jordan Wolfson
September	Anne Collier	Anne Collier
September	—N/a	Hans Ulrich Obrist, Etel Adnan
September	—N/a	Precious Okoyomon
September	Freja Beha Erichsen	Michelangelo Pistoletto
September	Diana Silvers; Djuna Bel	Torbjørn Rødland
September	—N/a	Thomas Ruff
September		Tschabalala Self
September	Dara Gueye; Tina Diedhiou (and twelve uncredited models)	Massimo Vitali
October	Chiara Ferragni	Scandebergs
November	Lady Gaga	Steven Meisel
December	Maty Fall Diba; Khady Sow; Ndack Ndiaye	Rafael Pavarotti

=== 2022 ===
Issue	Cover model	Photographer
January	Veronica Yoko Plebani	Cho Gi-Seok
February	Coco Rebecca Edogamhe	Alasdair McLellan
March	Donatella Versace	Mert & Marcus
April	Vittoria Ceretti	Rafael Pavarotti
May	Joan Smalls	Cho Gi-Seok
June	Adut Akech	Vito Fernicola
July	Zendaya	Elizaveta Porodina
August	Matilda De Angelis	Brett Lloyd
September	Gigi Hadid	Rafael Pavarotti
October	Mariacarla Boscono	Tanya & Zhenya Posternak
November	Rosalía	Harley Weir
December	Thomas Raggi; Ethan Torchio; Victoria De Angelis; Damiano David	Hugo Comte

=== 2023 ===
Issue	Cover model	Photographer
January	Sora Choi	Carlijn Jacobs
February	Elodie	Giovanni Corabi
February	Tatjana Patitz (In memoriam)	Peter Lindbergh
March	Gisele Bündchen	Rafael Pavarotti
April	Kendall Jenner	Robin Galiegue
May	Bella Hadid	Carlijn Jacobs
June	Anok Yai	Oliver Hadlee Pearch
July	Kim Kardashian	Rafael Pavarotti
August	Tosca Grasso	Maciek Pożoga
September	Angelina Kendall	Carlijn Jacobs
October	Isabella Rosellini	Zhong Lin
November	Anna Ewers	Bruno Staub
December	Liya Kebede (Reflection: Jem Perucchini)	Campbell Addy

=== 2024 ===
Issue	Cover model	Photographer
January	Benedetta Porcaroli	Elizaveta Porodina
February	Adele Aldighieri; Ajok Daing; Malika El Maslouhi; Marina Moioli; Maty Fall Diba; Paola Manes; Valeria Buldini	Mark Kean
March	Taylor Russell	Paolo Roversi
April	Bella Hadid	Zoë Ghertner
May	Irina Shayk; Charles Leclerc; Carlos Sainz Jr.	Theo Liu
June	Hunter Schafer	Ethan James Green
July	Bad Bunny	Rafael Pavarotti
August	Karen Elson	Martin Parr
September	Mariacarla Boscono	Steven Meisel
September	Deva Cassel	Steven Meisel
September	Vittoria Ceretti	Steven Meisel
September	Maty Fall Diba	Steven Meisel
September	Linda Evangelista	Steven Meisel
September	Isabella Rossellini	Steven Meisel
October	Monica Bellucci	Tim Burton
November	Lana Del Rey	Steven Meisel
December	Alex Consani; Edward Buchanan	Rafael Pavarotti
December	Maty Fall Diba; Carlita	Rafael Pavarotti
December	Paloma Elsesser	Rafael Pavarotti
December	Amelia Gray	Rafael Pavarotti
December	Alek Wek	Rafael Pavarotti
December	Anok Yai; Carlita	Rafael Pavarotti

=== 2025 ===
Issue	Cover model	Photographer
January	Damiano David	Steven Klein
February	Miriam Leone	Maciek Pożoga
March	Ariana Grande	Elizaveta Porodina
April	Alice Rohrwacher; Alba Rohrwacher	Bea De Giacomo
May	Loli Bahia	Vito Fernicola
June	Nicki Minaj	Petra Collins
July	Vittoria Ceretti	Carlijn Jacobs
August	Hailey Bieber	Mikael Jansson
September	Mikey Madison	Steven Meisel
October	Sabrina Carpenter	Steven Meisel
October	Giorgio Armani (In memoriam)	Bob Krieger; Raffaele Grosso
November	Mia Goth	Mark Peckmezian
December	Wali Deutsch	Collier Schorr
December	Betsy Gaghan	Collier Schorr
December	Divine Mugisha	Collier Schorr

=== 2026 ===
Issue	Cover model	Photographer
January	Laura Mattarella	Brett Lloyd
February	Awar Odhiang	Rafael Pavarotti
February	(Tribute to Valentino)	NA
March	Bella Hadid	Gia Coppola
April	Léonie Cassel	Sebastián Faena
May	Mariacarla Boscono	Carlijn Jacobs
June	Mona Tougaard	Malick Bodian
July	Madonna	Rafael Pavarotti
August	Vittoria Ceretti	Vito Fernicola
September	Dua Lipa	Carlijn Jacobs
October	Roberto Bolle	Szilveszter Makó
October	Dove Cameron, Damiano David	Malick Bodian
October	Ida Heiner	Ethan James Green
November	Alicia Keys	Szilveszter Makó
December	Cara Delevingne	Lea Colombo

== See also ==
- List of Harper's Bazaar Italia cover models
