= Isa Stoppi =

Italian model (1941–2020)

- Stoppi in 1968
- Born: June 12, 1941; Tajura, Italian Libya
- Died: November 14, 2020; Milan, Italy
- Occupation: Model
- Years active: 1962–1972
- Children: 2

Isa Stoppi (12 June 1941 – 14 November 2020), was an Italian fashion model. Considered to be the most successful Italian model, Stoppi rose to prominence in the mid-1960s as a muse of Gian Paolo Barbieri and was featured heavily in the pages of Vogue. Richard Avedon named her "the most beautiful woman in the world." After representing Italy at the 1962 Miss Universe pageant, she was brought to New York City by Vogue editor Diana Vreeland and signed to Ford Models.

== Early life ==
Stoppi was born in Tajura, Italian Libya on 12 June 1941 to parents of Austro-Italian ancestry. Following Libyan independence in 1951 the family moved to a Syracuse, Italy where they lived in a caravan park. Following the death of her father Stoppi began working in a tomato-canning factory. The family would later move to Castell’Arquato.

== Career ==
Her modelling career began after representing Italy at the 1962 Miss Universe beauty pageant. Her brother introduced her to photographer Gian Paolo Barbieri and following an unsuccessful swimwear shoot in 1964, Barbieri introduced her to Pablo Manzoni who gave her a makeover. Following the makeover Barbieri photographed her posing with a boa constrictor, Vogue editor-in-chief Diana Vreeland saw the photo and Stoppi was brought to New York City and signed to Ford Models. Stoppi emerged alongside four other Italian models working in New York: Benedetta Barzini, Marina Schiano, Alberta Tiburzi, and Mirella Petteni. All of whom rose to prominence due to Vreeland.

During her career Stoppi would work with Irving Penn, Bert Stern, Jacques Henri Lartigue and Henry Clarke among others. In December 1965, Stoppi was featured on the cover of what is cited as one of the first issues of Vogue Italia. (Note: Erroneously reported as featuring on the cover of the first issue (October 1964), Stoppi featured on the cover of the first issue that featured "Italia" within the Vogue "O" in the Vogue & Novita logo, see Vogue Italia#Background.)

In the late 1960s she attempted to transition into a career as an actress, her first and only film appearance was in 1969's The Appointment, directed by Sidney Lumet.

Following her 1972 marriage she retired from modelling, occasionally working with Helmut Newton, Horst P. Horst, and Oliviero Toscani. She then worked for Vogue Italia as a fashion editor until the birth of her son Germano.

== Personal life ==
In the late 1960s she met industrialist Gian Germano Giuliani at a Milan night club. They would marry in 1972 in Lugano, Switzerland, where they would raise their two children (Germano and Giammaria) due to kidnapping threats from the Red Brigades. Following their divorce she would date Ted Kennedy of whom she had an on-and-off relationship with since the 1960s. In 1988 she married insurance broker Renzo Ghezzi.

She lived the last decades of her life primarily on the Spanish island of Ibiza.

== Death ==
Stoppi died on 14 November 2020 in Milan, Italy from cancer. A full-page obituary was printed for her in the Italian newspaper Corriere della Sera.

== Filmography ==
Year	Title	Director	Role	Notes	Ref.
1969	The Appointment	Sidney Lumet			
