= Greta Hofer (model) =

Austrian fashion model (born 2001)

- Born: Greta Elisa Hofer c. 8 January 2000 (age 26); Steinach am Brenner, Austria
- Modeling information
- Height: 1.74 m (5 ft 8 1/2 in)
- Hair color: Brown
- Eye color: Blue
- Agency: The Society Management (New York); Elite Model Management (Paris, Milan, London, Copenhagen); Sight Management Studio (Barcelona); SP-Models (Innsbruck) (mother agency)

Greta Elisa Hofer (born 8 January c. 2000) is an Austrian fashion model.

== Career ==
Hofer was spotted by a scout while out in Innsbruck, as well as via Instagram. After securing an agent, she made her runway debut as a Prada exclusive in 2020, featured in models.com's Top 50 Worldwide, and campaigns/editorials for brands like Vouge, Giorgio Armani, and Calvin Klein, and starred in Prada's S/S 2021 campaign. Despite the COVID-19 pandemic stalling the fashion industry at that time, her career took off that year. She is known for her short haircut, which she has kept since she was 17 years old. In May 2021, Hofer appeared on the cover of Vogue Italia for an astrology-themed issue, with other models such as Anna Ewers, Jill Kortleve, and Rebecca Leigh Longendyke on alternate covers, all of them wearing the same Chanel outfit. In September 2022, she participated in the Vogue World event, walking the runway dressed as Cruella de Vil with many other top models and influencers as well as celebrities including Serena Williams. Hofer has appeared in W, The Wall Street Journal, Vogue France, and Vogue Japan.

Vogue picked her as one of the "10 Breakout models" of the spring 2022 season. Hofer has walked the runway for designers Isabel Marant, Valentino, Dior, Alberta Ferretti, Jil Sander and Chloé among others. Outside of Prada, she has appeared in ensemble campaigns for Dior (pre-fall), and Salvatore Ferragamo alongside actor Jharrel Jerome and other models.

== Personal life ==
Hofer is the youngest of three, having two sisters, and they were raised in the Austrian Alps town of Steinach am Brenner. At age 17, she cut her previously long hair overnight. She learns languages in her spare time including Russian and French. She lives in Vienna, and says she wants to help "normalise homosexual relationships".
