= The Last Sitting =

Book and photo shoot of Marilyn Monroe

- Cover of the later complete edition
- Author: Bert Stern; Annie Gottlieb
- Subject: Marilyn Monroe
- Publisher: William Morrow and Company
- Publication date: October 1982
- Pages: 188
- ISBN: 0-688-01173-X
- OCLC: 8345846

The Last Sitting is a book and photo shoot of Marilyn Monroe by photographer Bert Stern. The photo shoot was commissioned by Vogue magazine in late June 1962, taking place over three daily sessions, just six weeks before she died.

Bert Stern published The Last Sitting in 1982. The book included many of the over 2,500 images that Stern had shot, including contact sheets with images Monroe had disliked and crossed out.

In 2008 Stern shot recreations of the images used by Vogue—with actress Lindsay Lohan as the model—for the February 25, 2008 issue of New York.

== Publishing history ==
=== Hardcover editions ===
- The Last Sitting. William Morrow and Company (1982) ISBN 0-688-01173-X
- The Last Sitting. Orbis Publishing (1982) ISBN 0-85613-468-6
- The Last Sitting. Random House Value Publishing (January 9, 1988) ISBN 0-517-40254-8
- Marilyn Monroe's Last Sitting. Schirmer/Mosel Verlag GmbH (1998) ISBN 3-88814-261-X
- Marilyn Monroe: The Complete Last Sitting. Schirmer/Mosel Verlag GmbH (2000)
- Marilyn Monroe: The Complete Last Sitting. Schirmer Art Books (2006) ISBN 3-88814-191-5
- Marilyn Monroe: The Complete Last Sitting. Te Neues Publishing Company (2000) ISBN 3-8238-5483-6

=== Paperback editions ===
- Marilyn Monroe: The Complete Last Sitting. Schirmer/Mosel Verlag GmbH (2000)
- La Derniere Seance: Marilyn Monroe. Éditions Gallimard (2006) ISBN 2-07-011857-6
- Marilyn Monroe: The Last Sitting. Random House Mondadori (2007) ISBN 0-307-39164-7
