= Trish Goff =

American model and actress

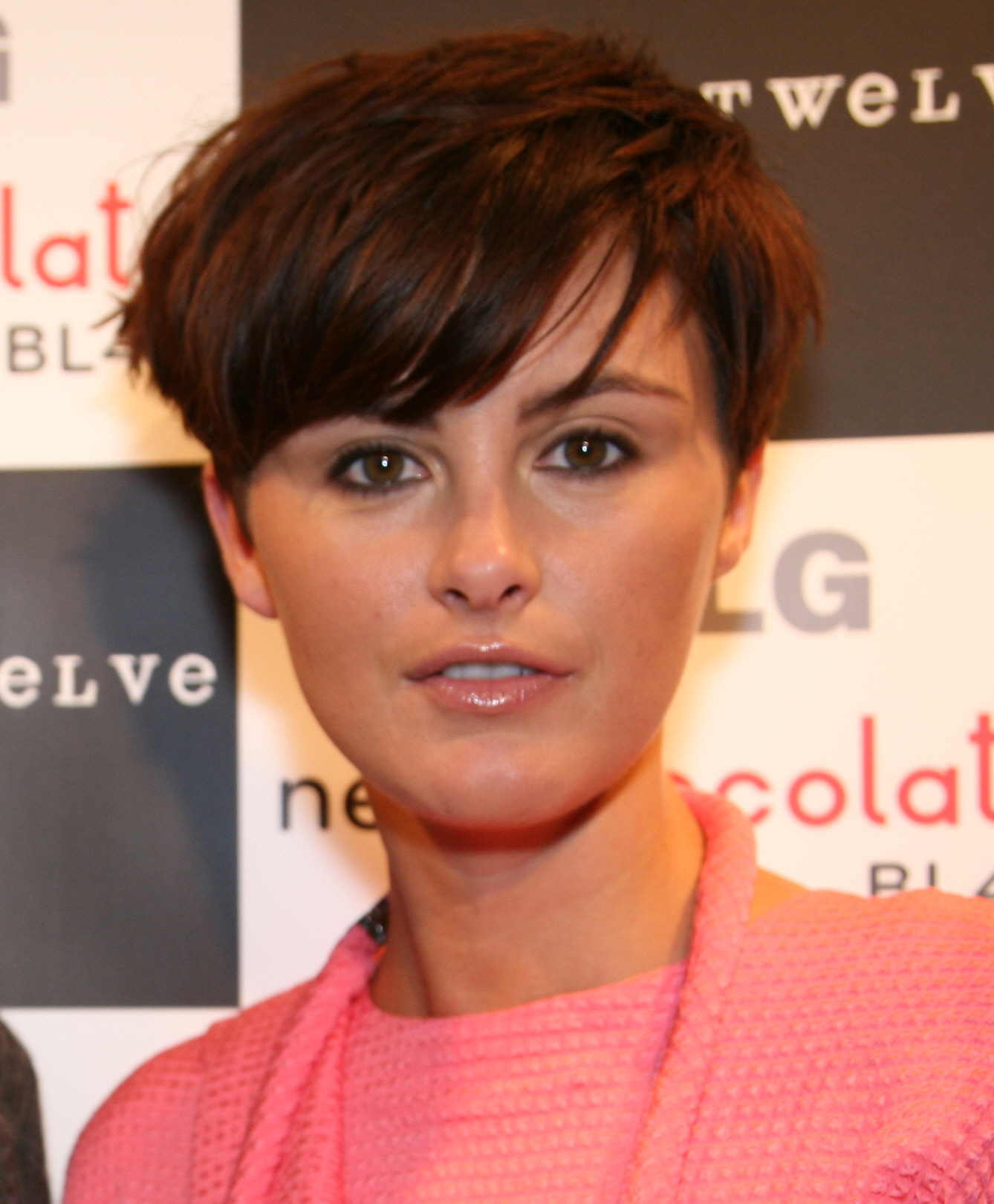
- Goff in 2009
- Born: June 8, 1976 (age 50); Florida, U.S.
- Occupations: Model, actress, real estate broker
- Years active: 1994–present
- Children: 1
- Modeling information
- Height: 1.75 m (5 ft 9 in)
- Hair color: Brown
- Eye color: Brown
- Agency: DNA Model Management (New York); VIVA Model Management (Paris, London); Why Not Model Management (Milan)

Trisha Jana Goff (born June 8, 1976) is an American model, actress and real estate broker.

== Early life and career ==
Goff was born and raised in Northern Florida. She was discovered by a modeling scout at the age of 15. After being discovered, she dropped out of school and moved to New York City to pursue a career in modeling. She has appeared on the cover of a variety of international editions of Vogue and in several Victoria's Secret Fashion Shows. Goff also appeared in campaigns for Banana Republic, Chanel, Chloé, Christian Dior, Gap, Pollini, Ann Taylor, Louis Vuitton, Versace, and YSL. In 2005, she starred in the psychological thriller Noise.

She returned from a two-year hiatus to close for Alexander Wang fashion show in February 2009. Goff later moved to London with her husband, casting director Angus Munro. The couple later moved to Portugal before divorcing.

After returning to the United States, Goff received her real estate license from New York University and now works as a broker for Compass, Inc. in New York. She lives in Chelsea, Manhattan. Goff previously worked for the Douglas Elliman real estate company.

In the midst of the Harvey Weinstein abuse sex scandal, Goff alleged that she too was an abuse victim of Harvey Weinstein.

== Personal life ==
Goff and Aaron Ward had a son named Nyima Lee Ward. He was born on January 2, 1997 and died on May 29, 2024. The cause of death was not revealed.
