= Amy Wesson =

American fashion model

Amy Wesson (born 1977) is an American fashion model from Tupelo, Mississippi.

== Career ==
Wesson was discovered at age 16 while working at a clothing store in a shopping mall. She has been featured in advertising campaigns for Thierry Mugler's Angel perfume, Christian Dior, Versace, Calvin Klein, Valentino, BCBG, Max Azria, Missoni and Moschino.

Wesson has twice landed the cover of Italian Vogue and has also been on the cover of W. She was the cover model for the Smashing Pumpkins' 1998 release Adore.

In 2001, Wesson was featured in the Sports Illustrated Swimsuit Issue.

She is signed with agencies New York Model Management, Marilyn (Paris), Why Not (Milan), and Modelwerk (Hamburg).
