= Gian Paolo Barbieri =

Italian fashion photographer (1935–2024)

Gian Paolo Barbieri or Giampaolo Barbieri (1935 – 17 December 2024) was an Italian fashion photographer.

== Life and career ==
Born on the Via Mazzini in Milan, Barbieri's family were fabric wholesalers, and his father owned a department store. He performed in amateur dramatics in the mid-1950s, forming "The Trio", a performance troupe with his friends. Barbieri also had a non-speaking role in Luchino Visconti's film Medea. He was influenced by cinema at an early age and photographed models in 1960s Rome, part of the social scene that was portrayed in Federico Fellini's 1960 film La Dolce Vita.

A self-taught photographer, his first professional work was an apprenticeship to the Harper's Bazaar photographer Tom Kublin, who died twenty days later. In 1963 Barbieri had some images published in the Italian fashion magazine Novità, which became Vogue Italia in 1965. Barbieri also shot for the American and French editions of Vogue.

The role of fashion editor had not been fully created in the 1960s, and Barbieri had to find the best setting for his photographs and create the hairstyles, makeup, and jewellery. This could lead to the use of unusual materials, a notable example being earrings made with table tennis balls painted in a mother-of-pearl colour.

Barbieri opened his own studio in Milan in 1964, and began to work closely with ready-to-wear fashion designers a few years later. His creative relationship with Walter Albini led to an appreciation of the role of the stylist, and Barbieri and the fashion designer Valentino were responsible for innovations in modern fashion advertising campaigns. Notable models that Barbieri has photographed include Mirella Petteni, Jerry Hall, Veruschka, Monica Bellucci and Audrey Hepburn. Barbieri has worked for fashion designers Armani, Versace and Ferré, and Dolce & Gabbana, Pomellato, and Giuseppe Zanotti.

In the 1990s Barbieri became a travel photographer. An exhibition of Barbieri's work was curated by the English fashion photographer David Bailey, shown at the Victoria and Albert Museum in London and the Kunstforum in Vienna.

Barbieri photographed in analog and did not retouch his pictures. One of his early cameras was a Reflex Voigtländer 35mm. In 1968 he was awarded the Biancamano Prize as Best Italian Photographer and was named one of the 14 best international fashion photographers by the German magazine Stern in 1978.

Barbieri died in Milan on 17 December 2024, at the age of 89.

== Books ==
- Fiori della mia vita, Silvana (2016)
- Flowers, Silvana (2016)
- Skin, Silvana (2015)
- Dark Memories, Skira (2013)
- Gian Paolo Barbieri, Federico Motta (2007)
- Catalogo Mostra Palazzo Reale (2007)
- Body Haiku, Dolci Japan gallery (2007)
- Sud, Pomellato (2006)
- Exotic Nudes, Taschen (2003)
- Innatural, Contrasto (2001)
- A History of Fashion, Photology (2001)
- Equator, Taschen (1999)
- Tahiti Tattoos No. 2, Taschen (1998)
- Madagascar, Taschen (1997)
- Pappa e Ciccia, Pappa & Ciccia Editori (1991)
- The maps of desire, Pomellato (1989)
- Tahiti Tattoos No. 1, Fabbri (1989)
- Barbieri, Fabbri (1988)
- Venti Anni di Vogue Italia 1964–1984, Edizioni Condé Nast (1984)
- Silent Portraits, Massimo Baldini (1984)
- I grandi fotografi, gruppo editoriale Fabbri (1982)
- Artificial, FotoSelex (1982)

== Publications ==
- Novità
  - 1963: July, November
  - 1964: February, July, September, October, November
  - 1965: September
- Vogue Italia
  - 1965: November (Isa Stoppi), December (Mirella Petteni)
  - 1966: January, February, November, December
  - 1967: November, December
  - 1968: January, February, April, May, June, September, October
  - 1969: January, February, March, July
  - 1971: April
  - 1972: May, October, December
  - 1973: June, September, October, December
  - 1974: March, June, September, November
  - 1975: March, April, June, September, October, November, December
  - 1976: September, October, December
  - 1977: March, April, May, November, December
  - 1978: April, May, June, November, December
  - 1979: January, March, July, December
  - 1980: February, March, May, June, October, December
  - 1981: February, May, September, October, December
  - 1982: June, September
  - 1983: January
  - 1985: March
  - 2013: March
- Linea Italiana
  - 1966: Spring-Summer
  - 1967: Autumn-Winter
  - 1968: Spring-Summer
- Vogue Paris
  - 1974 m: June
- Vogue Giappone
  - 2017: January
- Progresso Fotografico
  - 1981: January
- Photo Italia
  - 1989: number 165
  - 1990: number 180
  - 2001: number 11
- IO Donna
  - 1997: March, April, July
  - 1998: July, November
  - 1999: December
- GQ
  - 2000: July, September, October, November
  - 2001: February, March, August, September, October, November
  - 2002: June, July
  - 2003: January, March, May, November
  - 2004: February, June
  - 2005: April, May, August, November
  - 2006: February, May
  - 2014: July
- GQ Russia
  - 2011: March
- Vanity Fair
  - 2004: March, May
  - 2005: May, October
  - 2006: July, November
  - 2008: August, September
  - 2009: July
- Glamour
  - 2015: October
