= Missy Rayder =

American fashion model (born 1978)

- Born: Missy Rayder; June 21, 1978 (age 48); River Falls, Wisconsin, U.S.
- Other name: Melissa Rayder
- Modeling information
- Height: 1.78 m (5 ft 10 in)
- Hair color: Dark Brown
- Eye color: Blue
- Agency: One Management (New York); Oui Management (Paris); Fashion Model Management (Milan); Premier Model Management (London); Iconic Management (Berlin)

Melissa "Missy" Rayder (born June 21, 1978) is an American fashion model. She is the younger sister of model Frankie Rayder. Her career is highlighted by appearances on several leading high fashion magazines such as Vogue Italia, Vogue España, and Elle France. She is linked to her sister through various print ad campaigns and joint cover girl work.

== Background ==
Born in River Falls, Wisconsin, Rayder has done runway show modeling of ready to wear apparel since 1997. She has also appeared in print ads for companies including Ann Taylor, Balenciaga, Barneys New York, Bulgari fragrance, Burberry, David Yurman, Escada, GAP, Jean Paul Gaultier, Kenneth Cole, Missoni, Moschino, Nordstrom, Prada, Louis Vuitton, Vera Wang, and most recently Agent Provocateur.

In 1997, Missy debuted in Paris and Milan runway shows for Chloé, Costume National, Trussardi and others. In the fall of 2000, The New York Times referred to Missy and Frankie Rayder collectively as the famous Rayder Sisters. They had been featured together on the May 2000 cover of Harper's Bazaar. Rayder was considered to be one of the top models at Elite Model Management in New York City at the beginning of 2002. Elite opened up a new division to cater to her and its other top models: Erin O'Connor, Maggie Rizer, Karen Elson, Oluchi Onweagba, and Sophie Dahl. In April 2002, she had income tax issues that nearly prevented from reentering the United States due to money earned overseas during Mercedes Australian Fashion Week. That September, Steven Meisel asked her to shave her hair and eyebrows for a New York Marc Jacobs show. In the following months she was on the cover of German Vogue (October) and Vogue Italia (November) with the latter being Meisel's work.

Rayder was one of the featured models (along with her sister and Linda Evangelista, Twiggy, Patti Hansen with daughters Alexandra and Theodora Richards, and Beverly Johnson) in the 50-model Ann Taylor 50th Anniversary ad campaign that was photographed by Annie Leibovitz in 2004.

In 2006, she appeared on the Harper’s Bazaar’s best-dressed list. Rayder is among the people often spotted as a celebrity at New York Knicks games at Madison Square Garden.

Between 2002 and 2007, Rayder appeared on the cover of Vogue Italia six times (November 2002, November 2003, January 2004, July 2004, January 2005, and January 2007) and she also has appeared on the cover of Vogue España (September 2006, April 2008, March 2009) and German Vogue (July 2005). Other cover highlights include Elle France (July 2000 and September 2008) and Elle Italy (February 2001).

In January 2008, she left, DNA, Viva, and Why Not to sign with IMG worldwide. As of February 2009, Rayder was represented by IMG in both New York and Paris, Why Not Model Management in Milan and 2pm Model Management Copenhagen.

== Personal ==
Rayder went to visit her sister Frankie in New York City in 1995 and moved to Tribeca. Frankie and Missy formerly lived across the street from each other in New York. During the September 11 attacks, Missy still lived in Tribeca. The Rayder sisters (along with a third sister named Molly) appeared in holiday ads for Gap as siblings in 2003 to the tune of "Put a Little Love in Your Heart". In later years, Rayder and Frankie appeared in Gap holiday ads as a pair. There are a total of four Rayder sisters. They have one brother and their father continued to live in River Falls in 2004.

Along with Maggie Rizer, Karen Elson, and Oluchi Onweagba, Rayder was part of a team of Elite models who cut their billing rate by as much as 75% to appear at a benefit for the Children's Hospital of Philadelphia in 2001. In 2006, Rayder was the subject of photographic work that served as the basis for sketches and a 30-by-42-inch (76 by 107 cm) pastel drawings that appeared at a benefit for the Whitney Museum of American Art before being placed at the Calvin Klein flagship store on Madison Avenue. The theme of the works were Art from fashion.
