= Amanda Murphy (model) =

American model

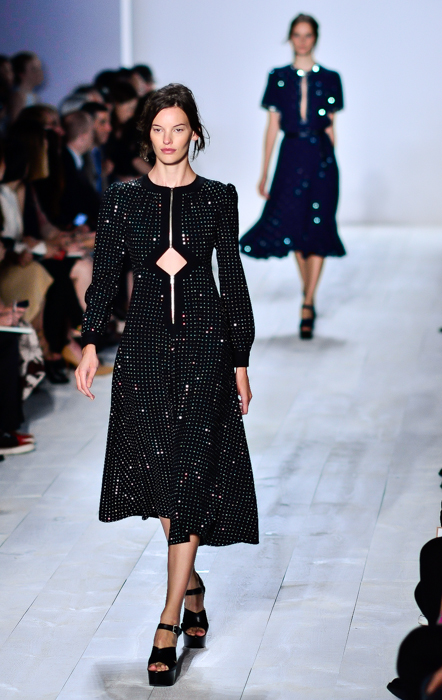
- Amanda Murphy walks the runway at the Michael Kors Spring/Summer 2014 show at New York Fashion Week, September 2013.
- Born: November 16, 1986 (age 39); Chicago, Illinois, U.S.
- Modeling information
- Height: 5 ft 11 in (1.80 m)
- Hair color: Brown
- Eye color: Brown
- Agency: IMG Models (Worldwide)

Amanda Jean Murphy (born November 16, 1986) is an American fashion model, radiology technologist, and equestrian. She is best known for being a Prada muse for over a decade. She has been listed as an Icon and one of the Top 50 models in the world by models.com She has been on the cover of Vogue Italia four times.

== Early life ==
She is from Orland Park, Illinois, and is the oldest of 4.

== Career ==
Murphy started her modeling career at 17 after finishing school.

Her breakout year was 2013 where she debuted as a Prada exclusive and Proenza Schouler exclusive.

In addition to her Prada work, she has been in notable advertisements for Prada Beauty, Hermes, Bottega Veneta, Zara, H&M, Céline, DSquared2, Giorgio Armani, and Salvatore Ferragamo.

She has been on the cover of Vogue Italia, Vogue Japan, i-D, V magazine, The Edit by Net-a-Porter, and T: The New York Times Style Magazine.
