= Franco Rubartelli =

Italian photographer and film director

Franco Rubartelli (born 1937), is an Italian photographer, film director and television spots maker.

Rubartelli was born in Florence.

Rubartelli worked for magazines such as Vogue and Glamour, and helped to discover Veruschka. In Venezuela he later made two more films and many television commercials for brands (Simplicio and Ya Koo) centered on figures of very young natives: Pepiwe, the protagonist of the film Ya Koo, is a Yanomami boy who recovers his origins in the jungle.

== Filmography ==
- Veruschka (1971)
- Simplicio (1978)
- Ya Koo (1985)
