= Hiro (photographer) =

Japanese-born American photographer (1930–2021)

- ヒロ
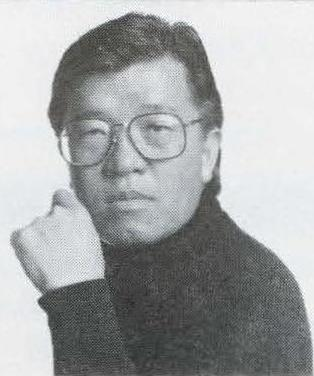
- Hiro circa 1986
- Born: 若林 康宏 (Wakabayashi Yasuhiro); November 3, 1930; Shanghai, China
- Died: August 15, 2021 (aged 90); Erwinna, Pennsylvania, U.S.
- Citizenship: United States
- Occupation: Photographer

Yasuhiro Wakabayashi (若林 康宏, Wakabayashi Yasuhiro) (3 November 1930 – 15 August 2021), known professionally as Hiro (ヒロ), was a Japanese-American commercial photographer. He was known for his fashion and still life photography from the mid-1960s onward.

== Early life ==
Hiro was born in Shanghai to Japanese parents. His family returned to Japan from China at the end of the Second World War.

== Photography career ==
In 1954, he went to the United States, and briefly enrolled in the School of Modern Photography in New York. He was dissatisfied with the school, however, and apprenticed himself to the studio of Lester Bookbinder and Reuben Samberg. At the end of 1956, he gained an apprenticeship at Richard Avedon's fashion photography studio in New York City. In 1957, Avedon recommended him to Alexey Brodovitch, the art director at Harper's Bazaar, and Hiro worked there as his assistant for a time, during Brodovitch's Design Laboratory at The New School.

By the end of 1957, Hiro was no longer Avedon's assistant, and had launched his own career. Within only a few years, Hiro became a fashion photographer in his own right. He contributed as a staff photographer to Harper's Bazaar from 1956 to 1975, then worked as a freelancer taking commissioned assignments from Harper's, Vogue and other magazines.

One of his early celebrated photographs is a 1963 image of a Harry Winston diamond necklace placed on a bovine hoof. Surreal and unique, Hiro's photographs are noted for their elegance and clean appearance. He uses uncommon lighting, the juxtaposition of unexpected elements, and his particular use of color.

He was named Photographer of the Year by the American Society of Media Photographers in 1969 and 1982. Also in 1982, the trade magazine American Photographer devoted an issue to him. In 2020 Hiro was inducted into the International Photography Hall of Fame and Museum.

He died at his country home in Erwinna, Pennsylvania, on 15 August 2021, at the age of 90.

== Personal life ==
Hiro married set designer Elizabeth Clark in 1959, and they had two sons. He lived primarily in Manhattan, and had a country home in Erwinna, Pennsylvania.

== Publications ==
- Hiro: Photographs. New York: Bulfinch, 1999. Edited by Richard Avedon. ISBN 9780821225929. With an afterword by Mark Holborn.
