= Emily Sandberg Gold =

American model and entrepreneur

Emily Sandberg
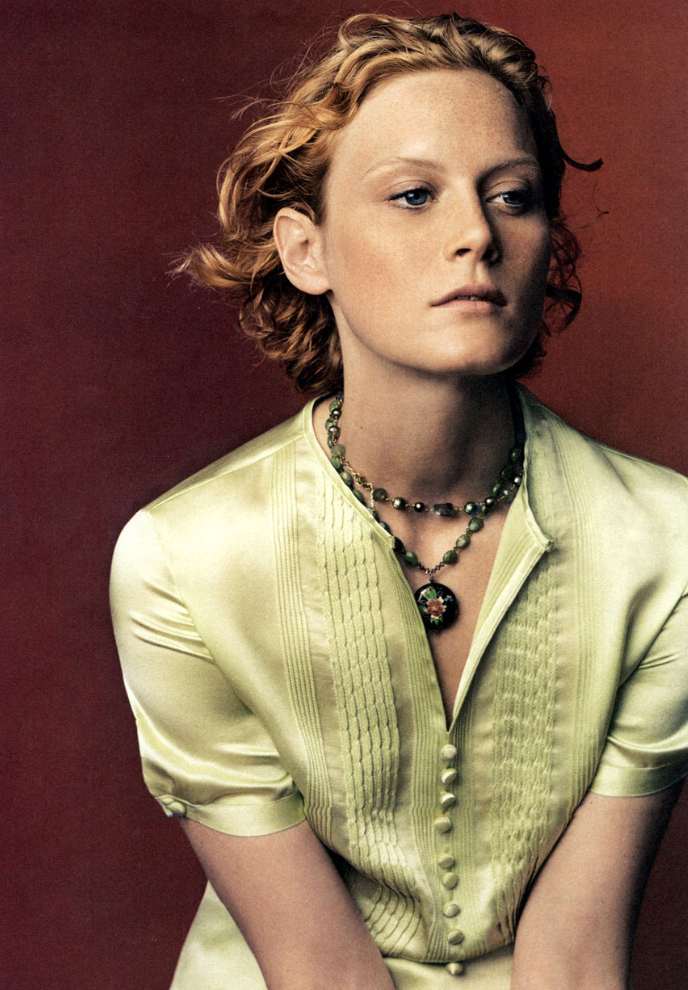
- Born: Emily Sandberg; May 26, 1978 (age 48); Rochester, Minnesota, U.S.
- Occupations: Entrepreneur, fashion model
- Known for: Twice Social
- Spouse: Divorced
- Children: 2
- Modeling information
- Height: 1.75 m (5 ft 9 in)
- Hair color: Red / blonde
- Eye color: Blue
- Agency: Iconic Models
- Website: twicesocial.com

Emily Sandberg Gold (née Sandberg; born May 26, 1978) is an American model and entrepreneur from Rochester, Minnesota. She was the international face of Clinique, Donna Karan, Versace, Fendi, and The Gap. She has also been featured on the covers of Vogue Italia, Vogue Japan, and Italian Marie Claire. In 2015 Gold became the founder and chief executive officer of digital marketing agency Twice Social. She later founded Gold Brand Consultants, a brand-strategy consultancy.

== Early Career ==
Sandberg moved to New York at 18 and signed with Next Model Management. From 1998 to 2007, Gold was an international runway fixture, walking for fashion houses like Marc Jacobs and Balenciaga. She has been the face of ad campaigns for Versace, Fendi, DKNY and Marni. She has been photographed by Annie Leibovitz, Steven Meisel, Mario Testino, Craig McDean, Mikael Jansson and Peter Lindbergh. Gold has also appeared on five Vogue covers, as well as the covers for Harper's Bazaar and Elle, and the 2002 September issues of Glamour and Vogue Italia.

In March 1999, Emily was first on the cover of Vogue Italia alongside Malgosia Bela, photographed by Steven Meisel.

Named one of the top 50 models by Models.com Marc Jacobs designed a bag named after Emily. Sandberg has been represented by Next NY, Elite LA, DNA models, IconicFocus, Fashion Milan, Elite Paris

Sandberg was the face for Fendi's Fall/Winter 1999 campaign, directed by Karl Lagerfeld. Karl Lagerfeld.

Sandberg was a recurring subject of Italian fashion photographer Paolo Roversi. She appears in Roversi's 1999 photobook Nudi, a collection of nude portraits of established fashion models and other subjects photographed in his painterly style. Nudi was published by Stromboli at Steidl in 1999.

Sandberg's work with Roversi also included the Krizia Spring/Summer 1999 advertising campaign and fashion editorials for Vogue Italia and i-D. She appeared with Malgosia Bela and Erin O'Connor in a Roversi editorial for Vogue Italia in February 1999 and was photographed by him again for the magazine in February 2003.

Sandberg's former blog, Supermodel Central, chronicled her life as model and featured interview of models and fashion's creative teams.

Vogue named Sandberg as a runway-star-turned-tech-entrepreneur who returned to the runway for Prada's FW 22 runway show in Milan. The runway show was a "salute to profession of modeling" and a "history of women."

Sandberg has remained involved in fashion education and mentorship, including workshops for aspiring models and runway instruction for young designers and fashion-program participants in Nashville. She is a mentor for Fashion Trust U.S.

== Business Career ==
After retiring from full-time modeling, Sandberg worked in product development, branding, and marketing before moving into digital marketing. In 2015 Sandberg founded Twice Social, a Nashville-based digital marketing agency. Twice Social worked with fashion brands and models on digital strategy and social media. She later founded Gold Brand Consultants.

== Filmography ==
- VH1/Vogue Fashion awards (2000) - Self
- The Devil Wears Prada (2006) - Clacker
- Employee of the Month (2006) - Young Mom
- Old Dogs (2009) - Sara
