= Remington Williams =

American fashion model

- Born: Austin, Texas, U.S.
- Modeling information
- Height: 1.79 m (5 ft 10 1/2 in)
- Hair color: Red (naturally blonde)
- Eye color: Blue
- Agency: Foreman Management (Austin); DNA Models (New York); Silent (Paris); The Fabbrica (Milan); Models 1 (London)

Remington Williams is an American fashion model. She has been on the cover of Vogue Italia.

== Career ==
Williams was discovered while working at a Chipotle Mexican Grill in Austin, Texas–10 days later she debuted at Calvin Klein. She has also walked for Sies Marjan, Marc Jacobs, Missoni, Moschino, Chanel, Rick Owens, Christopher Kane, Erdem, Maison Margiela, Miu Miu, Sacai, Schiaparelli and Coach New York (which she closed).

Williams was on the cover of the March 2018 issue of Vogue Italia and has appeared in editorials for Dazed, W, Interview and Love.

For the F/W 2018 season, models.com listed her as a "Top Newcomer."
