= Chris von Wangenheim =

German photographer

- Born: Christoph von Wangenheim; 21 February 1942; Brieg, Province of Lower Silesia, Germany
- Died: 9 March 1981 (aged 39); Saint Martin
- Occupation: Fashion photographer
- Years active: 1965–1981
- Spouse: Regine Jaffry
- Children: 1
- Parent: Konrad Freiherr von Wangenheim

Christoph von Wangenheim (21 February 1942 – 9 March 1981) was a German fashion photographer of the late 1960s through the early 1980s.

== Biography ==
Wangenheim was born in Brieg, during the Second World War, the son of Konrad Freiherr von Wangenheim, an aristocratic German Cavalry officer who became an Olympic horse rider at the 1936 Olympic Games in Berlin, winning a gold medal in Team Eventing. In 1944, while serving on the Eastern Front, his father was taken prisoner and held in a POW camp located in the Soviet Union. He remained imprisoned for almost ten years and was found hanged days before his intended release.

After studying architecture for a period of time, Wangenheim decided to pursue his interest in photography. In 1965, he moved to New York City where he worked as a photographer's assistant for David Thorpe and James Moore until 1967. He started his own studio the following year and began working for the American edition of Harper's Bazaar, and for the Italian edition of Harper's Bazaar in 1970.

American Vogue became his primary outlet in 1972, but he also worked for its German, French and Italian editions, as well as for Esquire, Playboy, Interview, and Viva magazines. Wangenheim is also known for his advertisements for Christian Dior, Calvin Klein, and Revlon.

Supermodel Gia Carangi did her first major fashion shoot with him in October 1978. He took the photographs of Carangi standing naked behind a chain-link fence. Carangi became one of Wangenheim's favorite models and worked with him on several fashion photographs throughout her career.

On 9 March 1981, Wangenheim was killed in a single-car crash while on holiday in Saint Martin. At the time of his death, he was in the process of divorcing the former model Regine Jaffry, with whom he had one child.

On September 15, 2015, Rizzoli published a book on Wangenheim's work and life by Roger Padilha and Mauricio Padilha entitled Gloss: The Work of Chris von Wangenheim, with a foreword by the photographer Steven Klein.
