= Meghan Collison =

Canadian model

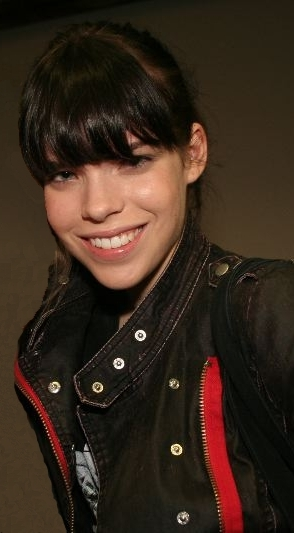
Collison in 2007

Meghan Collison is a Canadian model.

== Career ==
Collison was born in Edmonton, Alberta, Canada and was discovered at a local mall by Kelly Streit of Mode Models.

At the age of 18, she moved to New York City and rose to fame as one of the world's top models, working internationally in major fashion markets. Her big break came in October 2007, when she appeared on the cover of Italy's Vogue magazine, photographed by Steven Meisel. Since then, she has done shows and advertisements for Dolce & Gabbana, Marc Jacobs, Prada, Anna Sui, H&M, Topshop, Swarovski, Valentino, Givenchy, Louis Vuitton, and other prominent fashion designers.

She has also appeared in editorials in W magazine, Pop, Dazed & Confused, and Vogue (in Italian, Russian, German, Japanese, French, English, and Chinese editions).
