= Jamie Bochert =

American musician and model

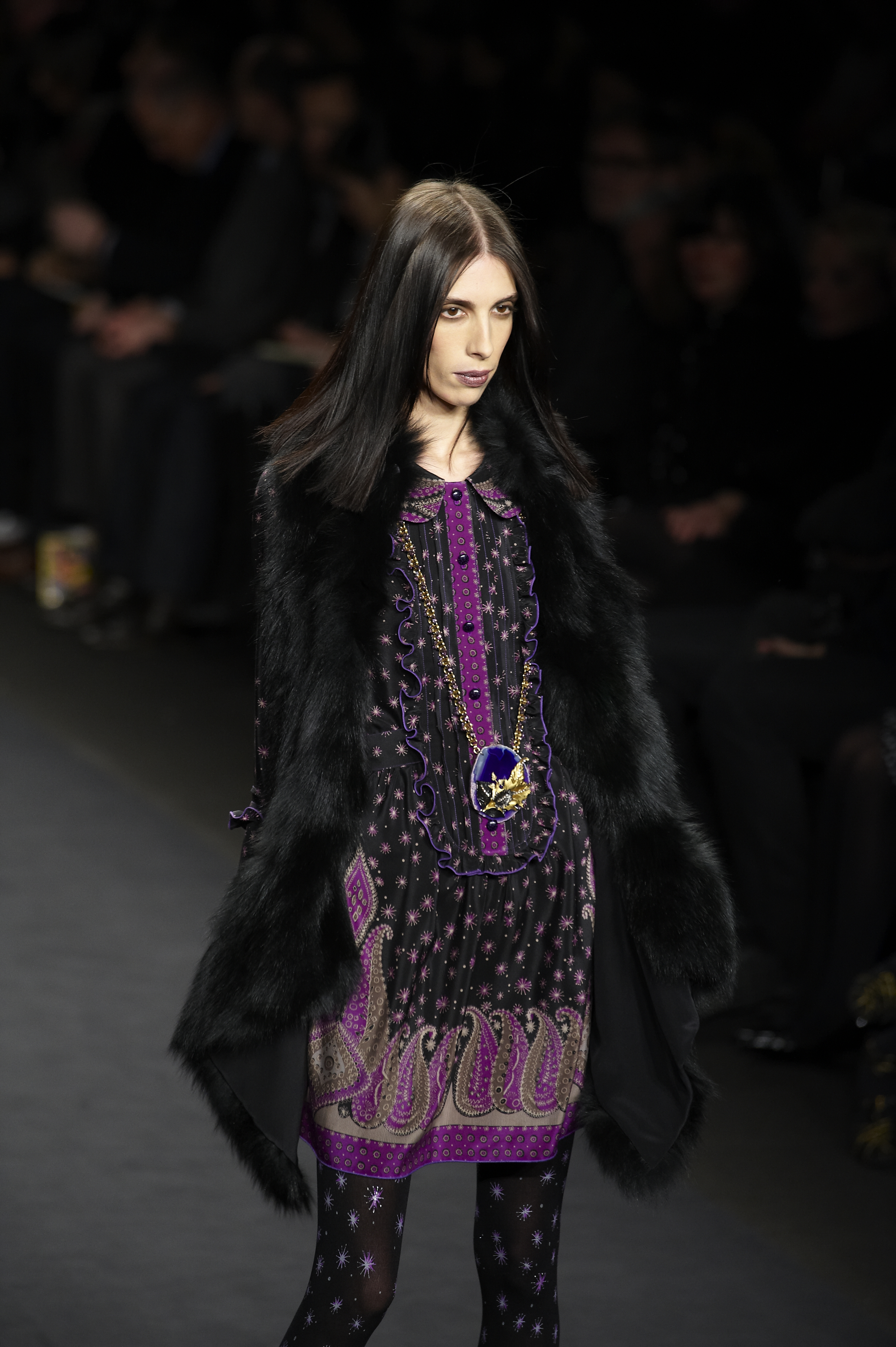
- Bochert on the catwalk for Anna Sui FW 2010
- Born: December 4, 1978 (age 47); New Brunswick, New Jersey, U.S.
- Other name: Francis Wolf
- Occupations: Model; musician
- Years active: 2002–2021, 2025
- Height: 5 ft 10 in (1.78 m)
- Spouse: Sergey Skliarenko (m. 1997, divorced)
- Partner: Michael Pitt (2004–2014)

Jamie Lynn Bochert (born December 4, 1978), also known by her stage name Francis Wolf, is an American former fashion model and musician, best known for her work in independent fashion magazines and for being a Marc Jacobs muse. She has garnered a dedicated cult following since her debut in 2002. She is currently ranked as an "Industry Icon" by models.com.

== Early life ==
Jamie Lynn Bochert was born on December 4, 1978, to Mary Lillian Bochert (née Swarbrick, born 1951) and James Howard Bochert (born 1946). She has an older sister, Anne-Marie (born May 19, 1971). Bochert is of primarily English descent. She lived in Louisiana for a few years as a child, and studied ballet as a teenager after failing her cheerleading audition. She began playing the piano at 10 years old. While living in Brea, California, Bochert attended Brea Olinda High School, where she studied dance. She graduated from Los Alamitos High School.

== Career ==
=== Modeling ===
Bochert was scouted by an agent in 2002 while working as a bartender at a restaurant in Los Angeles.

The model debuted on the catwalks of Paris for Ann Demeulemeester in March 2002 and was immediately noticed for her androgynous looks, which—in September of the same year—led to an appearance on the cover of British magazine i-D.

In May 2003, Bochert starred in the documentary Models: The Real Skinny. Despite her modeling success, in 2004, Bochert purportedly announced her withdrawal from the catwalks, to focus on her music. However, in 2008, she returned to work, signing new contracts with Women Management and Elite Model Management.

Bochert has appeared in editorials for Italian and German Vogue, Elle, W, V, and i-D. She has appeared on the covers of Italian and Japanese Vogue, i-D, and French Numéro. She has walked the runways for Bottega Veneta, Versace, Dries Van Noten, Tom Ford, Prada, Loewe, Givenchy, Chanel, Marc Jacobs, Sonia Rykiel, Alexandre Vauthier, Anna Sui, Michael Kors, Missoni, Dior, Thierry Mugler, Lanvin, Prabal Gurung, Alexander Wang, Proenza Schouler, DSquared2, Fendi, Louis Vuitton, Vera Wang, Rodarte, Max Mara, Balenciaga, Viktor & Rolf, Salvatore Ferragamo, Diesel, Diane Von Fürstenberg, Jean Paul Gaultier, Roberto Cavalli, Jeremy Scott, Alexander McQueen, Zac Posen, and Céline.

Bochert has appeared in advertising campaigns for Givenchy, Marc Jacobs, Balenciaga, Calvin Klein, Valentino, Phillip Lim, Bvlgari, Lanvin, Diesel, H&M, Christopher Kane, Maison Margiela, Jimmy Choo, Karen Millen, Furla, and Gucci.

=== Music ===
Although she has maintained a career in modeling, Bochert has cited music—namely, her band, Francis Wolf—as her "top priority." In 2016, she said she was working on an album. Her musical influences include Nick Cave, PJ Harvey, Lou Reed, and David Bowie.

=== Film ===
In 2005, Bochert appeared in musician Kim Gordon's film Perfect Partner. In 2013, she appeared in the short film The Return, which starred Geraldine Chaplin as Coco Chanel. In 2015, Bochert appeared in Karl Lagerfeld's short film Once and Forever.

== Personal life ==
Bochert married Sergey Skliarenko on September 24, 1997, in Manhattan. They later divorced.

Bochert was in a relationship with Michael Pitt from 2004 to 2014. Pitt revealed the two had been engaged "for a long time now" in 2009. They resided in Brooklyn together, and owned a cat named Crackhead. After their relationship ended, Bochert dated Argentine photographer Sofia Malamute from 2014 to 2016.

Bochert is claustrophobic and germophobic. As of September 2016, she resided in Williamsburg, Brooklyn with her cat Sid, who she had owned for 23 years.
