= Viktoriya Sasonkina =

Ukrainian fashion model (born 1988)

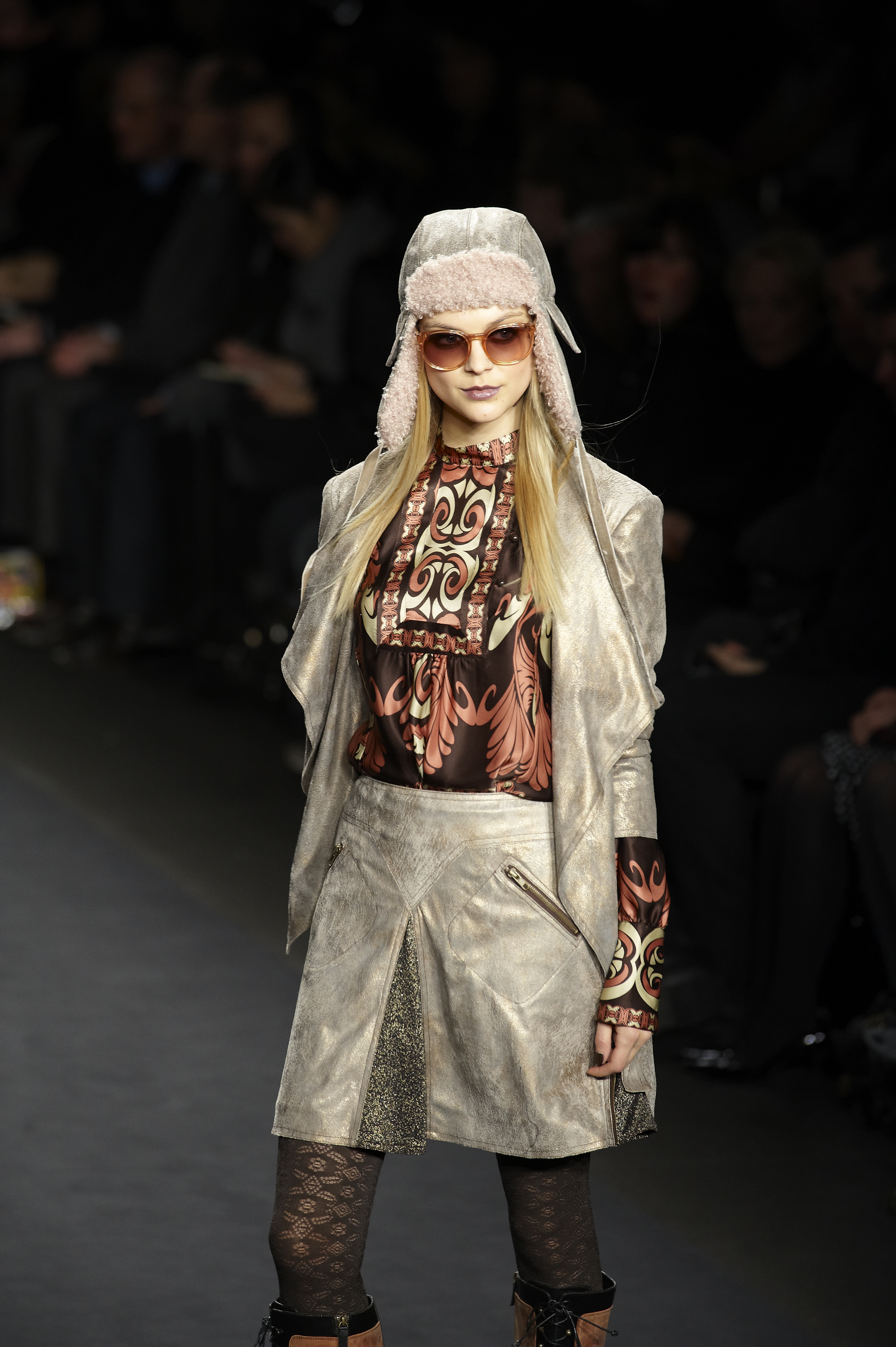
- Sasonkina on the runway at Anna Sui FW 2010.
- Born: July 7, 1988 (age 37); Odesa, Ukraine
- Occupation: Model
- Modeling information
- Height: 5 ft 9.5 in / 176.5 cm
- Hair color: Blonde
- Eye color: Blue
- Agency: Women Management (New York, Milan); Premium Models (Paris); Storm Model Management (London); View Management (Barcelona); Scoop Models (Copenhagen); Modelwerk (Hamburg); MP Stockholm (Stockholm); METRO Models (Zurich)

Viktoriya Sasonkina (Ukrainian: Вікторія Сасонкіна; born July 7, 1988) is a Ukrainian fashion model.

== Early life ==
Sasonkina was born in Odesa, Ukraine. As a child, she was interested in graphics and drawing, and took art lessons for seven years. She never considered modelling as a career. After finishing high school, she went to a model casting to support a friend, but was instead scouted herself by Stas Yankelevskiy, director of the international division of L-Models agency, who then invited her to Kyiv.

== Career ==
Aged 17, Sasonkina signed a contract with major modelling agency Premium Models in Paris, and made her catwalk debut at Issey Miyake's Spring 2007 show. After, she moved to London for work commitments. In February 2007, Sasonkina shot her first major magazine editorial for Italian Elle. In 2008, she signed a contract with leading modeling agency Women Management in both New York and Milan, and worked with legendary photographer Steven Meisel. Sasonkina has referred to Meisel as "the godfather for [her] modelling career." She eventually became one of Meisel's favourite models, with him shooting her for a Calvin Klein Jeans campaign and two Vogue Italia covers (September 2008 and January 2009) amongst others.

Sasonkina has appeared the cover of numerous international magazines, including Marie Claire, Elle, L'Officiel and twice on Vogue Italia. She has walked for Marc Jacobs, Vivienne Westwood, Bottega Veneta, Missoni, Versace, Phillip Lim, Oscar de la Renta, DKNY, Jason Wu, Prada, Issey Miyake, John Galliano, La Perla, Gianfranco Ferré, Jean Paul Gaultier, Laura Biagiotti, Rodarte, Dior, Michael Kors, Dolce & Gabbana, Roberto Cavalli, Blumarine, Nina Ricci, Anna Sui, Sportmax, Diesel, and Topshop, and appeared in advertising campaigns for Prada, Calvin Klein, Yves Saint Laurent, Alberta Ferretti, Gianfranco Ferré, John Galliano, Liu Jo, Vince Camuto, Mulberry, Sonia Rykiel, Barneys New York, Nordstrom, Juicy Couture, MAC, and Urban Decay.

Sasonkina currently lives and works in New York City.
