= Dawn Gallagher =

American writer and model

Dawn Gallagher is an American author and beauty and wellness expert, best known as the author of Naturally Beautiful: Earth’s Secrets and Recipes for Skin, Body and Spirit, and Nature’s Beauty Secrets: Recipes for Beauty Treatments From The World’s Best Spas. She is also a host on WebMD’s Spa Escapes.

== Biography ==
=== Early life ===
Gallagher was born and raised in Buffalo, New York in a family of ten. At the age of seventeen she was discovered at a local parade and moved to New York City to begin her modelling career with Elite Model Management under a lucrative contract.

=== Career ===
Dawn Gallagher promotes inner and natural beauty with a concentration on healthy or organic products. In her books she presents a multicultural and holistic approach to beauty using ancient and modern beauty secrets, healing practices and lifestyle tips.

As a fashion model she appeared on more than three hundred magazine covers including Italian Vogue, Italian Harper’s Bazaar, and in several international Cosmopolitan magazines. She walked the runway for designers including Ralph Lauren and Valentino. Her successful modeling career enabled her to travel extensively throughout Africa, Europe, Australia, Asia and North and South America. During her travels, Gallagher developed a passion for different cultures, which inspired her to research indigenous beauty and wellness regimes and secrets from women around the world.

She has collected recipes from spas including the Banyan Tree Spa in the Maldives and the Overwater Spa at Kamalame Cay in the Bahamas and re-created them into simple do-it-yourself recipes using natural ingredients. Her recipes have been featured in magazines including, Woman’s Day, Health (magazine), Fitness Magazine, Shape Magazine and the Chicago Tribune.

Gallagher has appeared in fashion and cosmetic campaigns including Maybelline, Clarins, Loreal and Clairol. She has also appeared on Good Morning America, the Today Show, Live with Regis and Kelly and Food 911. She was formerly the contributing editor for Alternative Medicine magazine and Hampton Jitney magazine.

Dawn Gallagher was the founder of Borneo Basics, a line of bath and body products created from natural, renewable resources from the rainforest. With a passion to preserve the global environment, particularly rainforests, she became an active member of Conservation International in Washington. Her status as a beauty and cosmetics authority enabled her to express her concerns on rainforest preservation resulting in her own personal care line. Portions of Borneo Basics’ proceeds were donated to Conservation International. She sold the company in 2000.

== Philanthropy ==
Gallagher co-founded and co-chairs the St. Jude Children's Research Hospital’s annual fashion gala.

== Published works ==
- Naturally Beautiful: Earth’s Secrets and Recipes for Skin, Body and Spirit (Rizzoli, 2000)
- Nature’s Beauty Secrets: Recipes for Beauty Treatments From The World’s Best Spas (Rizzoli, 2011)
