= Vibeke Knudsen =

Norwegian diplomat (1948–2016)

Vibeke Knudsen (10 November 1948 – 18 December 2016) was a Norwegian diplomat. She served as Norway's ambassador to Colombia from 2009 to 2016. She also holds a dual accreditation, serving as Norway's ambassador to Ecuador from 2010. She also held diplomatic offices in Venezuela, Greece, Austria, and the Netherlands. A social anthropologist by profession, Knudsen obtained a master's degree at the University of Oslo in 1980. That same year, she joined the Foreign Ministry. She retired in September 2016.

Knudsen died on 18 December 2016 at the age of 68.
