= Julia Nobis =

Australian model (born 1992)

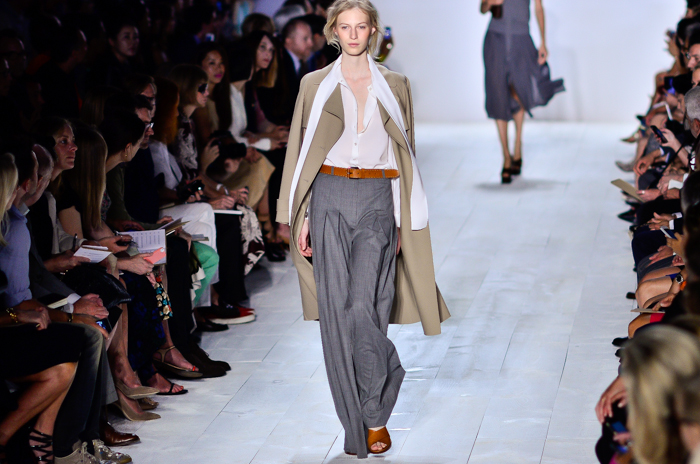
- Born: 27 June 1992 (age 34); Sydney, Australia
- Modeling information
- Height: 180 cm (5 ft 11 in)
- Hair color: Blonde
- Eye color: Blue
- Agency: DNA Model Management (New York); VIVA Model Management (Paris, London, Barcelona); Priscilla's Model Management (Sydney) (Mother Agent.)

Julia Nobis (born 27 June 1992) is an Australian fashion model. She is considered an "Industry Icon" by models.com and a supermodel by Vogue. She has been on the cover of Vogue Italia six times and Business of Fashion's top 500 list since 2014.

== Career ==
Nobis was discovered in 2009 and debuted as a Calvin Klein exclusive in February 2010. In the ensuing seasons, she walked for brands such as Chanel, Dior, Burberry, Balenciaga, Valentino, Versace, Yves Saint Laurent, Tory Burch, Marni, Salvatore Ferragamo, Celine, and notably closed Prada. Other brands she has walked for include Fendi, Emilio Pucci, Tommy Hilfiger, Sacai, Paco Rabanne, Michael Kors, Lacoste, Jason Wu, Haider Ackermann, Dries van Noten, Alexander Wang, Acne Studios, and Gucci among many others.

She has been in ad campaigns for Louis Vuitton, Prada, Fendi, Marc Jacobs, Dior, Calvin Klein, Valentino, Jil Sander, Proenza Schouler, Balenciaga, Lanvin, Sacai, Celine, Yves Saint Laurent, Moschino, Zara, Loewe, Tom Ford, Giorgio Armani, Max Mara, Versace, Alberta Ferretti and Givenchy among others.

Nobis received her Bachelor of Science (Applied Science) in 2019 from RMIT. She at one time aspired to become an ER doctor saying:

"Modelling was never my end goal. I get paid to study basically. I get paid better than your average uni student that's for sure. I kind of fell into modelling and stuck with it."
