= Anette Stai =

Norwegian model

- Born: Karen Anette Stai; March 24, 1961 (age 65); Norway
- Spouse: Jan-Eric Arnesen
- Children: 2

Karen Anette Stai (born 24 March 1961) is a Norwegian model. She was one of the top fashion models in the 1980s. Stai won the first Supermodel of the World contest in 1980.

After a few years of working as a model Stai felt burnt out. She was offered a contract with L'Oréal but decided to quit being a model. She has since worked as a fashion photographer and fashion editor, and has authored books.

She is married to Jan-Eric Arnesen. She has one son with Arnesen, one from a previous relationship and two stepsons.

== Published works ==
- Crazy business - photo model Diary (1983)
- In the midst of life: Living with seeing yourself and others (2003)
