= Élise Crombez =

Belgian model

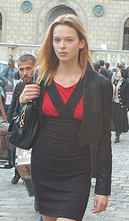
- Born: 24 July 1982 (age 44); Mouscron, Belgium
- Modeling information
- Height: 1.80 m (5 ft 11 in)
- Hair color: Brown
- Eye color: Hazel
- Agency: DNA Model Management (New York); Elite Model Management (Paris); Why Not Model Management (Milan); TESS Management (London); Uno Models (Barcelona); Seeds Management GmbH (Berlin); Dominique Models (Brussels); Stockholmsgruppen (Stockholm); Donna Models (Tokyo)

Élise Crombez (born 24 July 1982 in Mouscron, Belgium) is a Belgian model.

== Career ==
She grew up and went to school in Koksijde. She was discovered in 1999 when she decided to enter a fashion contest (Miss Mannequin) with a friend of hers. The contest was held in the Belgian town of Roeselare. She worked with Steven Meisel extensively throughout her career, landing campaigns for Prada, H&M, Versace, Armani, Nina Ricci, Gianfranco Ferre, Lacoste, Eres, GAP, Jil Sander, Ralph Lauren, Escada, Pollini, and Valentino. Crombez also appeared on covers for W, British, Italian, Mexican, Japanese, German, and Turkish Vogue, and twice on the cover of French Elle and six times on the cover of Italian Vogue. She has appeared in editorials for French, Italian, German, Turkish, Mexican, and Japanese Vogue, British and American Harpers Bazaar, W, and Allure. Crombez has walked in numerous fashion shows, such as Christian Dior, Christian Lacroix, Galliano, Karl Lagerfeld, Louis Vuitton, Prada, Versace, and Viktor & Rolf. She also appeared in the 2006 and 2007 Victoria's Secret fashion shows.

Crombez has received criticism for her "aggressively nondescript" image. The Times named Crombez as one of the "reliable, forgettable girls" it dubbed "Stepford supermodels". Crombez fell at the Proenza Schouler Spring 2007 runway show, her sky-high heels made her pitch forward, she ended taking off her shoes and walking the rest of the runway barefoot. It took third spot on the "Top Five Runway Falls" list by New York Magazine.

She is signed with DNA Models in New York. She resides in New York City.
