= Benedetta Barzini =

Italian actress and model

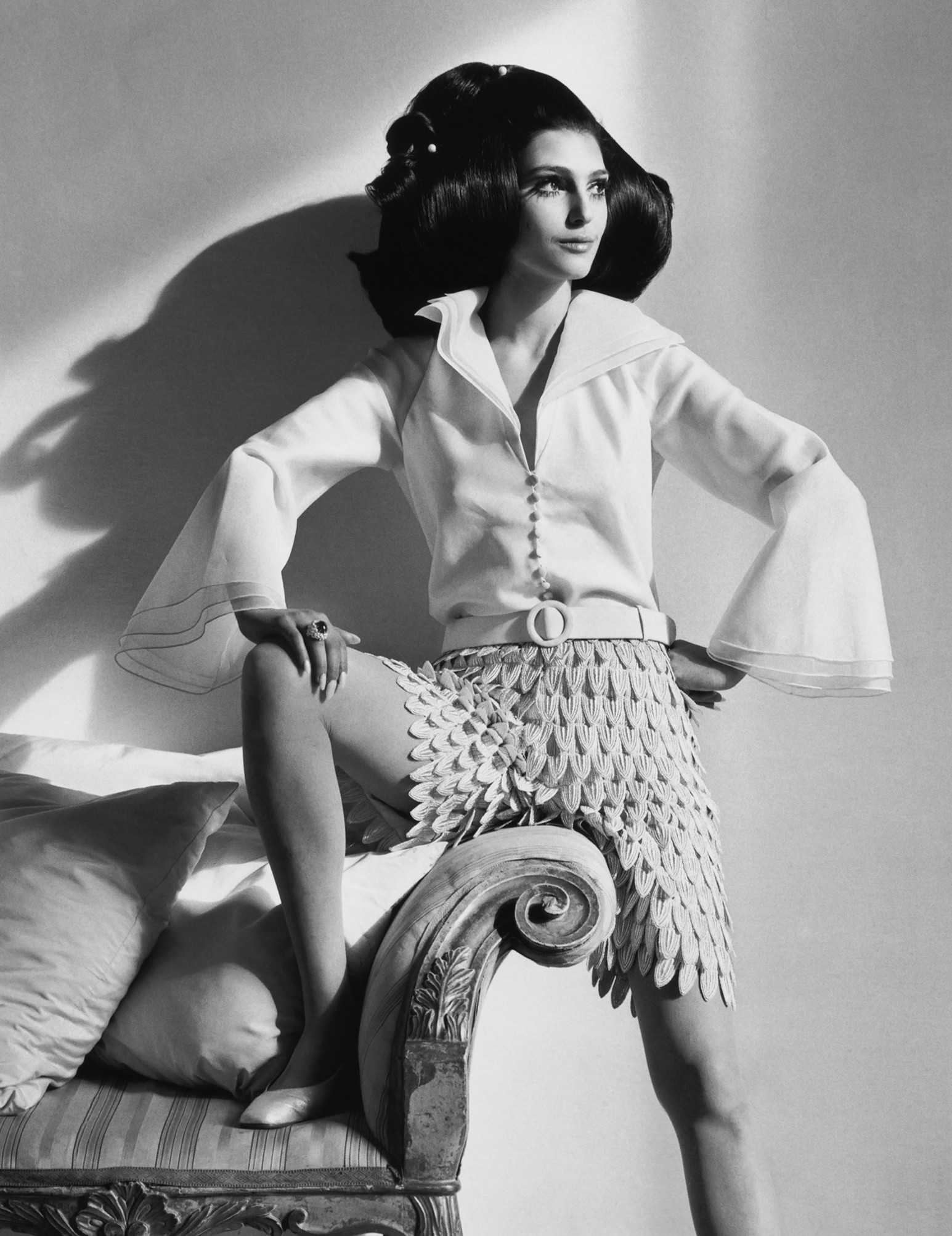
Benedetta Barzini in 1968

Benedetta Barzini (born 22 September 1943 in Porto Santo Stefano) is an Italian model, journalist, writer, educator, and feminist. She began her modeling career in the United States in the 1960s and became the first Italian woman to appear on the cover of American Vogue. In 1965, Barzini appeared on the cover of the inaugural issue of Italian Vogue Italia. She was photographed by Irving Penn, Richard Avedon, Ugo Mulas, and Henry Clarke. By the end of the decade, she had grown disillusioned with the fashion industry and returned to Italy, where she became involved with the Italian Communist Party and radical feminism. Barzini later worked as a writer and educator, lecturing at several universities and authoring more than five books.

== Biography ==
=== Early life ===
Benedetta was born on 22 September 1943 in Porto Santo Stefano as the youngest daughter of Italian journalist and author Luigi Barzini Jr. and his first wife, Giannalisa Gianzana Feltrinelli, wealthy widow of Carlo Feltrinelli. Benedetta's sibling Ludina was only one year older. Giannalisa Feltrinelli had a son from her previous marriage, Giangiacomo Feltrinelli. Her parents' marriage quickly fell apart; according to Benedetta's recollections, her mother did not love her or her sister Ludina. After leaving the family, Luigi Barzini didn't even congratulate Benedetta on her birthday, and when travelling to New York her mother rented herself an apartment on the 60th floor of a skyscraper, and her children a separate flat on the third, where a nanny lived with them. The relationship with her mother was so difficult that Benedetta began to suffer from anorexia and other psychological problems at the age of 14. Caught for the third time in a clinic for anorexics in Geneva, she sought help from the young Italian consul Antonello Pietromarca, who gave her a passport and helped her go to the juvenile court, where Benedetta received documents so that her mother could no longer interfere with her affairs.

=== Modeling career ===
Barzini was discovered at age 20 on the streets of Rome by Consuelo Crespi in 1963; Diana Vreeland soon thereafter received photographs of Barzini and sent a telegram asking if she could come to Manhattan to shoot for American Vogue with Irving Penn. She did so, and within ten days, she was signed with Ford Models. She hence established a successful fashion career in New York City, working with other notable fashion photographers such as Ugo Mulas, Richard Avedon, and Henry Clarke. Barzini appeared on the cover of the first issue of Vogue Italia in November 1965, and became the first Italian model to be featured on the cover of American Vogue.

In 1966, Barzini became romantically involved with, and later engaged to, New York poet and filmmaker Gerard Malanga, an early collaborator of Pop artist Andy Warhol. Malanga would dedicate various works to her, such as his Poems for Benedetta Barzini and The Last Benedetta Poems. Barzini also participated in two Screen Tests at Warhol's Factory in 1966, although she was not one of Warhol's superstars. She later recalled, "I never spent time with Andy, I spent time with the people that were spending time with Andy."

Barzini became friends with and muse to artists including Salvador Dalí, Lee Strasberg, Bert Stern, and Richard Avedon in the course of her career. In December 1966, Barzini was named one of the "100 Great Beauties of the World" by the American fashion magazine Harper's Bazaar.

Barzin began training at the Actors Studio during this period.

=== Activism and academic career ===
In 1968 she returned to Milan, tired, by her own admission, of being in America as a mere prop and a numb witness to the life that was going on around her, with no one interested in her as a person. She met Italian film director Roberto Faenza, and they married in 1969. On the night she gave birth to twins, Nini and Giacomo, Faenza left her. In Benedetta's recollections, the first years after their birth were the only when her mother paid for the check and thus supported Barzini.

Upon returning to Milan, Barzini became a Marxist and joined the Italian Communist Party and worked on a project for health courses for workers in factories. Barzini later married the designer Antonio Barrese, with whom she had two more children, Irene and Beniamino. Her marriage to Barrese lasted seven years.

From 1996 to 2016, Barzini taught fashion anthropology at the Polytechnic University of Milan and New Academy of Fine Arts, also in Milan, and at the University of Urbino, lecturing on subjects such as problematic images of women in fine art and the mass media. She guest-lectured at academic institutions such as the Italian University for Design.

Barzini was active in the feminist movement and has always been a critic of the objectification of the female body. She openly stated that in the fashion world, a woman is "game" and a photographer is a "predator" whose aim is to sell their prey to the highest bidder. In Western culture in the 1960s and 1970s, her ideas that inner value should take precedence over outer value and that natural ageing has its own beauty ran counter to the mainstream.

Barzini has also worked extensively as a journalist and writer. She has published "Elegance: Reflections on self-presentation" (L'eleganza per me. Riflessioni sulla rappresentazione di sè (1987), "Storia di una passione senza corpo" (1992), "Bemberg e l'arte di Gruau" (1995), "Aldo Coppola" (2000), "Emilio Cavallini" (2010), "Discipline fashion. The Ethics of Appearance" (Discipline della moda. L'etica dell'apparenza, 2003).

=== Later years ===
Since the mid-2010s there has been a renaissance in Barzini's public career. In 2015, designer Antonio Marras dedicated his autumn collection to her. In 2018, Barzini starred in a photo shoot for Vogue Italia.

In 2021, she became the face of the Gucci Beauty cosmetics line.

== Legacy ==
Barzini was the subject of Malanga's 30-minute experimental film In Search of the Miraculous (1967).

The 2019 documentary film, The Disappearance of My Mother, was directed by Beniamino Barrese, Barzini's son. The film showed at the London Film Festival 2019, Sundance, and other festivals, events, and venues, charting in at the 32nd Annual European Film Awards.

=== Awards and honors ===
In 2017, Barzini received a gold medal for civil honor from the Milan City Council, in part for "destroying the stereotype of the brainless cover girl."

In 2018, she won the Victoria award of the initiative Il tempo delle donne, established by Procter & Gamble.
