= Anne-Catherine Lacroix =

Belgian fashion model and photographer (born 1979)

Anne-Catherine Lacroix (also spelled Ann-Catherine Lacroix; born March 3, 1979) is a Belgian fashion model and photographer.

== Early life and education ==
At the age of 15, Lacroix was discovered in the Brussels metro by a modeling agent. However, she chose to complete her secondary education before starting her modeling career at 18, when she moved to New York City. Alongside her modeling career, she pursued academic studies and graduated with a Master's degree in Political Science, specializing in International Relations, from the Université libre de Bruxelles (ULB) at the age of 22.

== Modeling career ==
Anne-Catherine Lacroix made her modeling debut in 1998 and quickly became one of the most sought-after faces in the industry. She has walked the runways of prestigious fashion houses, including Chanel, Louis Vuitton, Balenciaga, Dior, Prada, Alexander McQueen, and Gucci, among many others. She has also featured in advertising campaigns for Yves Saint Laurent Beauté, Raf Simons, Courrèges, Jil Sander, and Pucci.

Her career highlights include:

- Collaborations with renowned photographers such as Steven Meisel, Inez & Vinoodh, Mario Sorrenti, Karl Lagerfeld, David Sims and Sølve Sundsbø.
- Editorials in prominent fashion magazines like Vogue (Paris, Italia, US, UK, Germany, Japan, and Korea), Harper's Bazaar, W Magazine, Numéro, and The Face.
- Cover appearances, including Vogue Paris (2002), Vogue Italia (2003 and 2004), and Self Service (2023).

Lacroix established strong professional relationships with designers like Nicolas Ghesquière, collaborating with him extensively during his tenure at Balenciaga, and with Karl Lagerfeld on multiple projects for Chanel.

== Artistic projects and photography ==
In addition to modeling, Anne-Catherine Lacroix is an accomplished photographer. She has collaborated with Belgian stylist Benoît Béthune on self-portrait projects exploring themes of identity and humor, inspired by the works of Cindy Sherman.

Between 2014 and 2017, she contributed to the development of Island, a Brussels-based art space dedicated to emerging international artists. There, she curated exhibitions, conferences, and screenings.

== Later career ==
From 2007 onward, Lacroix slowed her modeling activities to focus on her family and personal projects. She continues to work on select collaborations, such as the Courrèges campaign photographed by David Sims in 2022, and regularly walks for the brand under Nicolas Di Felice.

== Personal life ==
Anne-Catherine Lacroix has two daughters, Alaska (born in 2007) and Cy (born in 2012). In 2022, she earned a diploma in naturopathy from the European Institute of Natural Medicine.

== Representation ==
She is represented by:

- Elite Model Management (Paris and Milan)
- Identity Models (New York)
- Hakim Model Management (her mother agency)
