= Heather Bratton =

American fashion model

- Heather Bratton
- Born: Heather Bratton; June 25, 1987; West Virginia, U.S.
- Died: July 22, 2006 (aged 19); Newark, New Jersey, U.S.
- Occupation: Model
- Modeling information
- Height: 1.80 m (5 ft 11 in)
- Hair color: Brown
- Eye color: Brown

Heather Bratton (June 25, 1987 – July 22, 2006) was an American fashion model, who was known in the mid-2000s as a promising teenage fashion model.

== Modeling ==
She went to modeling school at 15 and she hoped to become an actress. Bratton experienced rapid success as a model, with photographer Steven Meisel featuring her on the February and May 2006 covers of Vogue Italia. She appeared during the summer of 2006 in shows in Milan and Paris, modeling for Prada, Gucci, Burberry and Chanel. Heather was the oldest of five siblings in her blended family, her nickname was "Sissy" because she also had a younger sister named Heather.

In 2006 Nian Fish, of KCD modeling predicted: "Heather Bratton, who did the Chanel, Chloe and Burberry Prorsum shows last season and was then shot by Meisel for Italian Vogue, will have "an amazing season."

== Death ==
Bratton was killed in a car crash that then resulted in a fire on July 22, 2006, on the New Jersey Turnpike, near exit 14 in Newark. She was on her way home after a shoot for W by photographer Craig McDean in which she was to be featured with model Coco Rocha. Bratton was buried in her home state of South Carolina, at the North Hampton Baptist Church cemetery. The September 2006 issue of Vogue Paris is dedicated to her memory.

The 2003 Ford Crown Victoria taxi Bratton was traveling in malfunctioned and came to a stop in the middle of the New Jersey Turnpike. The car then burst into flames when it was rear-ended by another vehicle. The Bratton family subsequently sued the Ford Motor Company and later settled for an undisclosed amount. The family also sued the New Jersey Turnpike Authority because it was reported that the lights were not working in the stretch of road where the accident occurred. In 2006 the lawsuit was settled for $125,000.

== See also ==
- List of people who died in road accidents
