= Hans Feurer =

Swiss fashion photographer (1939–2024)

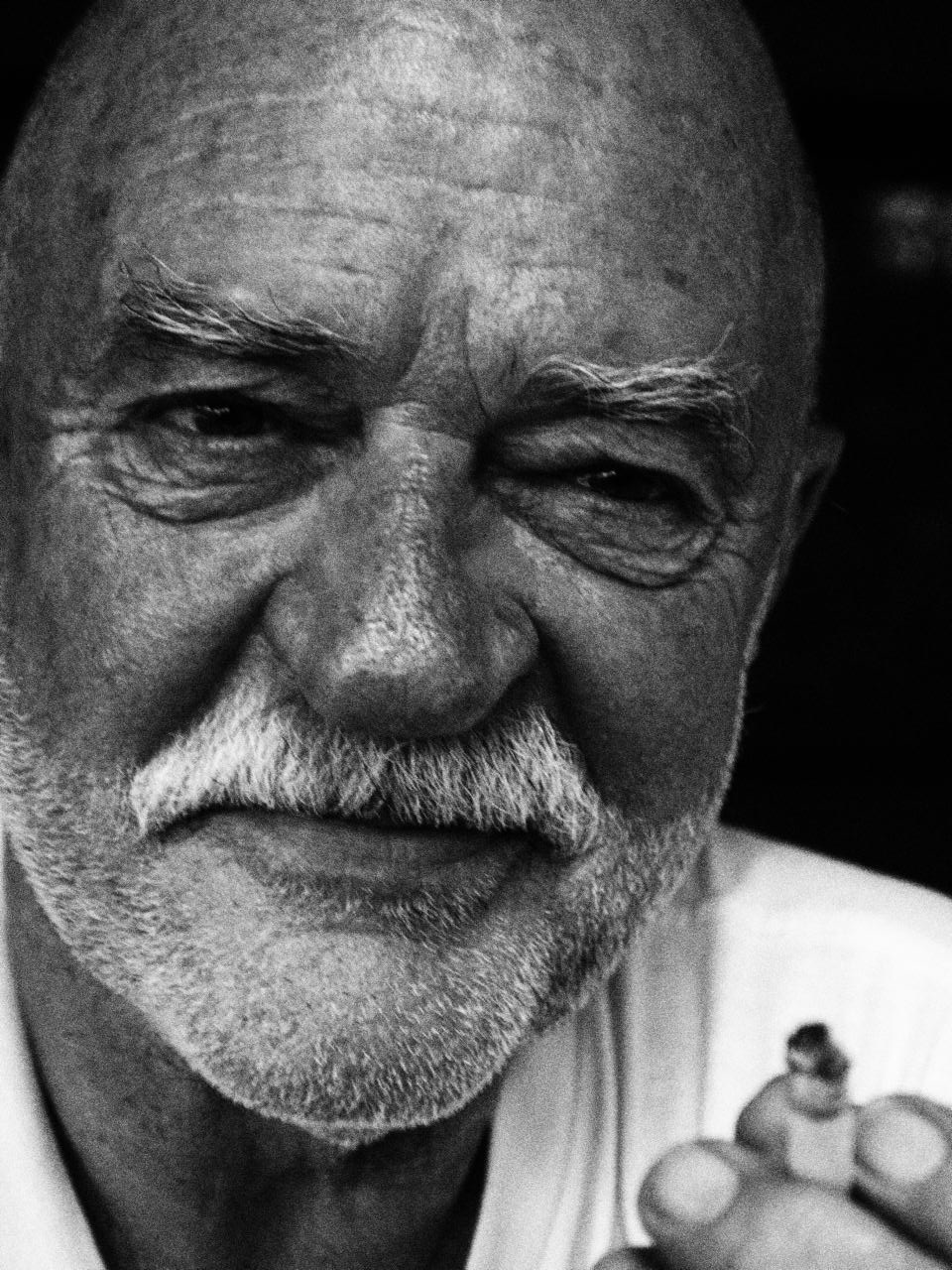
- Feurer in 2010
- Born: Hanspeter Feurer; 22 September 1939; St. Gallen, Switzerland
- Died: 16 January 2024 (aged 84)
- Known for: fashion photography
- Website: www.hansfeurer.com

Hans Feurer (born Hanspeter Feurer, 22 September 1939 – 16 January 2024) was a Swiss fashion photographer who lived in Zürich, Switzerland.

== Biography ==
Hans Feurer was born in Switzerland in 1939. After studying art there, he worked as a graphic artist, illustrator and art director for several advertising agencies in London. In 1966, after buying a Land Rover and leaving for Africa, he decided to embark as a professional photographer. He returned to London, rented a studio, and started working on his photographs. At the end of 1967, Hans Feurer’s work was recognized and his professional career officially launched. Feurer died on 16 January 2024, at the age of 84.

== Photography ==
In 1974, Feurer collaborated with Pirelli Calendar, as well as with famous fashion magazine for their time, Deutsch Sven and English Nova. Both magazines are no longer in print.

In 1983, Feurer had the opportunity to photograph a campaign for French luxury house Kenzo, with renowned model Iman. He is one of the most effectively marked photographers of his generation and was often requested by fashion magazines such as Vogue, Elle, Numero and Another.

== Exhibitions ==
In 2013, publishing company Damiani Editore gave Feurer the opportunity to publish a photography book, which ended up being the subject of an exhibition at the Parisian concept store, Colette, at the end of September 2013. In January 2014, Rome fashion week invited him, as guest of honor, to display some of his photographs. In June 2014, Hans showed a collection of his work at the Moscow contemporary art gallery RuArts, with the support of Vogue in Russia.

== Bibliography ==
- Hans Feurer, preface by Gianni Jetzer and Olivier Saillard, under the artistic direction of Fabien Baron, ed. Damiani editore, 2013 (ISBN 978-8862082921), 192 pages
