= Michaela Bercu =

Israeli model and actress

Michaela Bercu מיכאלה ברקו
- Born: March 31, 1967 (age 59); Tel Aviv, Israel
- Citizenship: Israel; Romania
- Spouse: Ron Zuckerman
- Children: 4
- Modeling information
- Height: 1.83 m (6 ft 0 in)
- Hair color: Blonde
- Eye color: Blue

Michaela Bercu (Hebrew: מיכאלה ברקו; born 31 March 1967) is an Israeli model and actress.

== Early life ==
Bercu was born in Tel Aviv, Israel, to Ashkenazi Jewish parents who immigrated to Israel from Romania. She is an only child. Her father Armand (1925–2007) hailed from Bucharest, while her mother Yehudit is from Timișoara. Bercu grew up speaking Hebrew, Romanian, and Hungarian. In 2015, she acquired Romanian citizenship.

== Career ==
She started her career as model at age of 14 when her mother took her to the fashion photographer Menachem Oz. She later signed with Elite Model Management. Bercu is married to businessman Ron Zuckerman. The couple have four children.

A cover of Bercu by Peter Lindbergh appeared on the November 1988 American Vogue wearing a bejeweled Christian Lacroix T-shirt and a pair of faded jeans; the shot was done outdoors in natural light. It was Anna Wintour's first cover since taking over as the magazine's editor-in-chief, and was seen as signaling a break from the more formal and posed cover images favored by her predecessor, Grace Mirabella. It was also the first time a model on the cover of Vogue was shown wearing jeans. Bercu was also the first Israeli woman to be featured on the cover of American Vogue. She would later appear on the covers of French, Italian, German, and Australian Vogue, American, British, Spanish, German, and Swedish Elle, Mademoiselle, L'Officiel, Madame Figaro, Glamour, and Cosmopolitan. She was also featured in the 1990 Sports Illustrated Swimsuit Issue.

She has appeared in advertising campaigns for Blumarine, DKNY, Joseph, Andrew Marc, Rochas, Laurèl, CP Shades, Lord & Taylor, Bloomingdales, L'Oreal, and Revlon.

Bercu also appeared in the American film Bram Stoker's Dracula as one of Dracula's sensuous brides, co-starring Gary Oldman, Winona Ryder, Anthony Hopkins and Keanu Reeves. She briefly retired from modeling in 1996 after marrying but returned in 1999 modeling plus sized clothing.

== Filmography ==
| Year | Title | Role | Notes |
|---|---|---|---|
| 1992 | Bram Stoker's Dracula | Dracula's Bride | |

== See also ==
- Israeli fashion
