= Rebecca Leigh Longendyke =

American fashion model from Hurley, New York

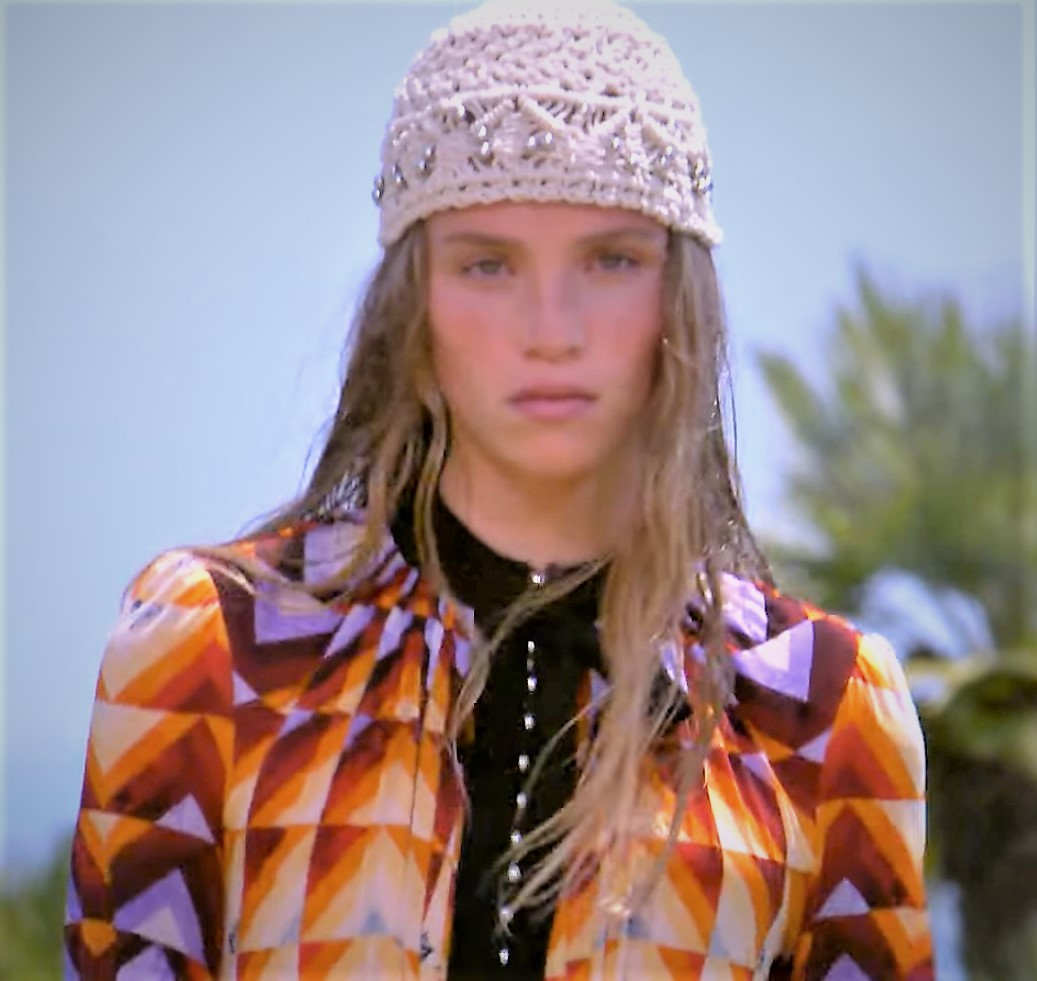
- Longendyke models for Paco Rabanne in 2021
- Born: July 21, 1996 (age 30); Hurley, New York, U.S.
- Education: Binghamton University
- Occupation: Model
- Modeling information
- Height: 1.77 m (5 ft 9 1/2 in)
- Hair color: Blonde
- Eye color: Blue-green
- Agency: Model Partner (Mother Agent); Elite Model Management (New York); Women Management (Paris, Milan); Models 1 (London); Munich Models

Rebecca Leigh Longendyke (born July 15, 1996) is an American fashion model. She has appeared on the cover of Vogue Italia three times and on the cover of Vogue Paris once.

== Early life and education ==
Longendyke, the middle child of three girls, was born and raised in the small town of Hurley, in the Hudson Valley of New York. She was scouted via Facebook by her mother agent, Model Partner, and did not begin modeling professionally until attending college at Binghamton University. Longendyke studied biomedical engineering, for which she earned her degree.

== Career ==
While working as a waitress, Longendyke's test photos were chosen to be in a Saint Laurent campaign, alongside British-French singer Charlotte Gainsbourg and American supermodel Amber Valletta. Her first runway show was for the former Calvin Klein Collection label, and she walked for Saint Laurent, Chanel, and Valentino among others. In the 2019-2020 season, she walked in 58 shows, for brands including Vera Wang, Burberry, Ralph Lauren, Victoria Beckham, Prada, Givenchy, Louis Vuitton, Miu Miu, and Chloé.

Longendyke first appeared on the cover of Vogue Italia in January 2019 photographed by Craig McDean, and shortly after, appeared on the cover of i-D photographed by Alasdair McLellan. She has also appeared on the cover of Vogue Japan and Vogue Germany. Longendyke has appeared in campaigns for Louis Vuitton, Chanel, Celine, Michael Kors, Michael Kors Gorgeous Fragrance, Mango, Isabel Marant, Calvin Klein, Calvin Klein Euphoria Intense Fragrance, Prada, Chloé, Tod's, and Zara.

Longendyke ranks on models.com's "Top 50" models list.
