= Anna Ewers =

German fashion model

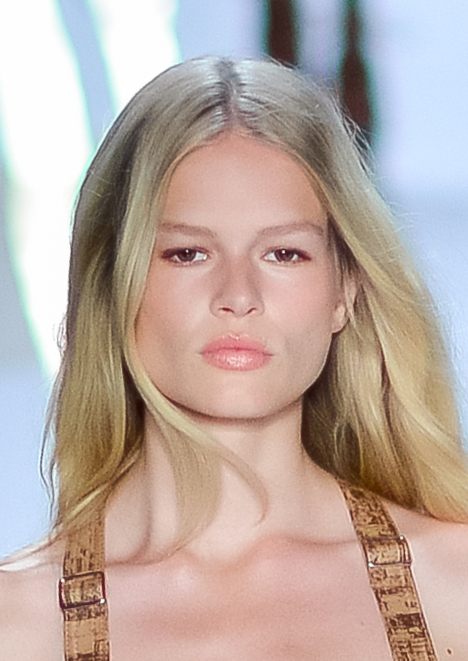
- Ewers in 2013
- Born: Anna Luisa Ewers; 14 March 1993 (age 33); Freiburg, Germany
- Occupation: Model
- Modeling information
- Height: 1.75 m (5 ft 9 in)
- Hair color: Blonde
- Eye color: Brown
- Agency: The Lions (New York); Women Management (Paris, Milan); Storm Management (London); UNIQUE DENMARK (Copenhagen); ENZIO.M Management (Freiburg); Modellink (Gothenburg); Model Management (Hamburg)

Anna Luisa Ewers (German: [ˈeːvɐs]; born 14 March 1993) is a German fashion model. She was featured on the 2015 Pirelli Calendar. In 2015, Models.com reported that she was chosen as Model of the Year by the fashion industry.

In a new generation of models known for their social media followings helping them get jobs, Anna Ewers has been compared to Kate Moss (with whom she co-starred in a David Yurman ad campaign) in that she is successful while keeping her private life off social media. She has also been compared to French icon Brigitte Bardot and fellow German supermodel Claudia Schiffer.

== Career ==
Ewers first started modeling in Colombia while she was an exchange student, then returned to Germany for school and worked as a cocktail waitress. Ewers was discovered by Alexander Wang when the designer found her photograph on a blog. He sent the image to casting director Anita Bitton who said "Lets find this girl!" Since then she has been Alexander Wang's muse.

During spring/summer 2014 Fashion Week (September–October 2013), she walked 37 fashion shows, including Céline, Balenciaga, Prada and opened Dolce & Gabbana and Alexander Wang. In February 2014, she was Milan Fashion Week's Top Model, walking 18 runways including Fendi and Emilio Pucci.

She often poses for Vogue Paris editorials : Miss Vogue Hamptons in October 2013, Fatale in March 2014 and another one alongside Natasha Poly for the June/July issue. She received her first cover in August 2014. Her other international covers include the Italian and Chinese editions of Vogue.

Between July 2013 and May 2015 she was on the cover of Vogue nine times, and in March 2015 was on the cover of Vogue Germany with five variant covers. She won the models.com award for Breakout Star.

She was chosen by Steven Meisel to be on the 2015 Pirelli Calendar, alongside Adriana Lima and Raquel Zimmermann.

In 2015, she covered the February issue of Vogue Paris.

In April 2018, Anna appeared in the David Yurman F/W 2018 campaign, which continued the theme of "Celebration," and was first established in the brand's 2000 campaign. This campaign were shot by Peter Lindbergh and featured top models Joan Smalls, Ashley Graham, Amber Valletta, and others.

Ewers has been featured in more than 100 editorials, campaigns, and lookbooks, including magazine covers for i-D, Numero China, Vogue China, Vogue Italia, Vogue Paris and W. She has walked the runway for over 60 designers, notably Balenciaga, Balmain, Calvin Klein, Chanel, Dior, Donna Karan, Fendi, Lanvin, Louis Vuitton, Marc Jacobs, Prada, Ralph Lauren, and Versace amongst many others.

== Personal life ==
Ewers lives in Williamsburg, Brooklyn. She has two sisters, Andrea and Antonia.
