= List of Vogue México cover models =

This list of Vogue México cover models (1980–1995 and 1999–present) is a catalog of cover models who have appeared on the cover of Vogue México, the Mexican edition of Vogue magazine.

== 1980s ==
=== 1980 ===
Issue	Cover model	Photographer
June		
August	Lourdez Alvarez Murphy	
September	Susana Sánchez	
October	Lourdes Skipsey Nieto	
December	Christa Grassi	

=== 1981 ===
Issue	Cover model	Photographer
January	Magali Moya Ibanez	
February	Lorena Isla	
March	Darlene Orava	Roberto Shapiro
April	Martha del Pino	
May		
June	Ramsey	Loretta Vaan der Veer
July		
August		
September		
October		
November		
December		

=== 1983 ===
Issue	Cover model	Photographer
January		
February		
March	Cheri Cameron	
April		
May	Cristina Landman	
June	Teri Hafford	
July		
August		
September	Jean Marie McClesky	
October	Esme Marshall	
November		
December		

=== 1984 ===
Issue	Cover model	Photographer
January		
February	Nanette Medellin	
March		
April		
May	Marianne Gravatte	
June	Maria Johnson	
July	Carol Alt	
August		
September	Suzanne Trimble (aka Suzanne Isabella Trimble)	
October		
November		
December		

=== 1986 ===
Issue	Cover model	Photographer
January	Catherine Benoît	Benjamin Kanarek
February		
March	Antonia Vasquez	Craig Sotres
April		
May	Janice Dickinson	
June		
July		Craig Sotres
August		
September	Jean-Marie (a.k.a. Giorgia)	
October	Deborah Isaacs	Gabriel Covián
November		
December	Laurie Shoemaker	Craig Sotres
Mexico86 World Cup Special		Annie Leibovitz

=== 1987 ===
Issue	Cover model	Photographer
January	Cindy Crawford	
February	Debbie Dickinson	Craig Sotres
March		
April		
May	Sophie Billard	Craig Sotres
June		
July		
August		
September	Paula Ciccone	Craig Sotres
October	Kathryn Redding	Craig Sotres
November	Maria Félix	Armando Herrera
December		

=== 1988 ===
Issue	Cover model	Photographer
January		
February		
March	Dawn Gallagher	Craig Sotres
April		
May		
June	Angela Roesler	
July		
August	Serina Rojas	Craig Sotres
September		
October	Diana	
November		Craig Sotres
December		

=== 1989 ===
Issue	Cover model	Photographer
January	Jacqueline de la Vega	
February		
March		
April	Kirsten Allen	Craig Sotres
May		Craig Sotres
June		
July	Roberta Chirko	
August		
September	Carmen Campuzano	
October		
November		
December		

== 1990s ==
=== 1990 ===
Issue	Cover model	Photographer
January		
February	Lauren Helm	
March		
April	Vellaye, Lorenza Silva	
May		
June	Celina del Villar	
July		
August	Jana Rajlich	
September		
October		
November		
December	Carmen Campuzano	

=== 1991 ===
Issue	Cover model	Photographer
January	Carmen Campuzano	
April	Patty Sylvia	
August	Fabiola Quiroz	

=== 1992 ===
Issue	Cover model	Photographer
May	Iman	
October	Fabiola Quiroz	

=== 1994 ===
Issue	Cover model	Photographer
April	Elsa Benítez	

=== 1995 ===
Issue	Cover model	Photographer
April	Yulia Sukhanova (Miss USSR 1989)	

=== 1999 ===
Issue	Cover model	Photographer
October	Carolyn Murphy	Steven Meisel
November	Gwyneth Paltrow	
December	Winona Ryder	Steven Meisel

== 2000s ==
=== 2000 ===
Issue	Cover model	Photographer
January	Kate Moss; Gisele Bündchen; Lauren Hutton; Iman; Naomi Campbell; Stephanie Seymour; Amber Valletta; Christy Turlington; Claudia Schiffer; Lisa Taylor; Paulina Porizkova; Carolyn Murphy; Patti Hansen	Annie Leibovitz
February	Gisele Bündchen	Steven Meisel
March	Gisele Bündchen & Carmen Kass	Steven Meisel
April	Graciela Alfano	Steven Meisel
May	Amber Valletta	Steven Meisel
June	Carolyn Murphy	Steven Meisel
July	Gisele Bündchen	Steven Meisel
August	Gisele Bündchen & George Clooney	Herb Ritts
September	Angélica Castro	
October	Carmen Kass	Steven Meisel
November	Bridget Hall	Steven Meisel
December	Carolina Parsons	

=== 2001 ===
Issue	Cover model	Photographer
January	Charlize Theron	Herb Ritts
February	Valeria Mazza	
March	Karolína Kurková	Steven Meisel
April	Carmen Kass	Steven Meisel
May	Renée Zellweger	Herb Ritts
June	Gisele Bündchen	Michael Thompson
July	Nicole Neumann	
August	Penélope Cruz	Herb Ritts
September	Catherine Zeta-Jones	Herb Ritts
October	Amber Valletta	
November	Flavia de Oliveira	Fernando Venegas
December	Linda Evangelista	Steven Meisel

=== 2002 ===
Issue	Cover model	Photographer
January	Gisele Bündchen	Steven Meisel
February	Carolyn Murphy	Steven Meisel
March	Karolína Kurková	Raymond Meier
April		
May		
June	Angelina Jolie	Annie Leibovitz
July	Anouck Lepere	
August	Ashley Judd	
September	Joanne Montanez	
October		
November	Kate Hudson	Herb Ritts
December	Maggie Rizer	Craig McDean

=== 2003 ===
Issue	Cover model	Photographer
January	Adriana Abascal	
February	Eugenia Silva	
March	Paulina Rubio	Roger Erickson
April	Esther Cañadas & Ricky Martin	Daniela Federici
May	Roselyn Sánchez	
June	Isabella Fiorentino	
July	Yamila Diaz	
August	Lily Aldridge	Roger Erickson
September	Carolyn Murphy	Steven Meisel
October	Elsa Benítez	Daniela Federici
November	Salma Hayek	Daniela Federici
December	Jodie Kidd	Rankin

=== 2004 ===
Issue	Cover model	Photographer
January	Nicole Kidman	Craig McDean
February	Penélope Cruz	
March	Esther Cañadas	
April	Inés Rivero	
May	Ana Beatriz Barros	Tony Notarberardino
June	Sarah Jessica Parker	Mark Seliger
July	Gisele Bündchen	Carter Smith
August	Claudia Schiffer	Rankin
September	Jennifer Lopez	
October	Elizabeth Hurley	
November	Eugenia Silva	
December	Fernanda Tavares	Tony Notarberardino

=== 2005 ===
Issue	Cover model	Photographer
January	Leonor Varela	
February	Adriana Lima	Tony Notarberardino
March	Jennifer Lopez	Mario Testino
April	Liliana Domínguez	
May	Cindy Crawford	Nick Knight
June	Gisele Bündchen	Patrick Demarchelier
July	Salma Hayek	Mario Testino
August	Cate Blanchett	Regan Cameron
September	Gemma Ward	Mario Testino
October	Daniela Urzi	
November	Natalia Vodianova	Patrick Demarchelier
December	Carolina Adriana Herrera	

=== 2006 ===
Issue	Cover model	Photographer
January	Kate Moss	Nick Knight
February	Natalie Portman	Corinne Day
March	Trish Goff	Greg Sorensen
April	Daria Werbowy	Mario Testino
May	Liliana Domínguez	
June	Rachel Weisz	Regan Cameron
July	Gisele Bündchen	Patrick Demarchelier
August	Carolyn Murphy	Mario Testino
September	Alessandra Ambrosio	Torkil Gudnason
October	Natalia Vodianova	Mario Testino
November	Caroline Winberg	Torkil Gudnason
December	Christy Turlington	Patrick Demarchelier

=== 2007 ===
Issue	Cover model	Photographer
January	Mischa Barton	Regan Cameron
February	Kate Moss	Nick Knight
March	Emina Cunmulaj	Tony Kim
April	Tiiu Kuik	Paola Kudacki
May	Natalia Vodianova	Mario Testino
June	Valentina Zelyaeva	Stephan Würth
July	Scarlett Johansson	Craig McDean
August	Jessica Stam	Patrick Demarchelier
September	Heather Marks	Paola Kudacki
October	Hana Soukupová	Rennio Maifredi
November	Élise Crombez	Rennio Maifredi
December	Eugenia Volodina	Greg Kadel

=== 2008 ===
Issue	Cover model	Photographer
January	Shannan Click	Rennio Maifredi
February	Eva Longoria	Greg Lotus
March	Diana Dondoe	Rennio Maifredi
April	Kate Moss	Craig McDean
May	Anouck Lepere	Tesh
June	Élise Crombez	Alexi Lubomirski
July	Amber Valletta	Paola Kudacki
August	Shannan Click	Nicolas Moore
September	Bianca Balti	Paola Kudacki
October	Coco Rocha	Craig McDean
November	Caroline Winberg	Lee Broomfield
December	Anne Vyalitsyna	Enrique Badulescu

=== 2009 ===
Issue	Cover model	Photographer
January	Gisele Bündchen	Patrick Demarchelier
February	Ali Michael	Paola Kudacki
March	Doutzen Kroes	Alex Cayley
April	Anne Hathaway	Mario Testino
May	Milana Keller	Sarah Silver
June	Rosie Tupper	Sarah Silver
July	Kate Moss	Annie Leibovitz
August	Shannan Click	Patrick Demarchelier
September	Coco Rocha	Tom Bettenton & Jenny Gage
October	Hana Soukupová	Sarah Silver
November	Tiiu Kuik	Sarah Silver
December	Heather Marks	Cliff Watts

== 2010s ==
=== 2010 ===
Issue	Cover model	Photographer
January	Sasha Pivovarova	Patrick Demarchelier
February	Lindsay Ellingson	Nino Muñoz
March	Dewi Driegen	Stephen Wuerth
April	Isabeli Fontana	Jacques Dequeker
May	Gisele Bündchen	Nino Muñoz
June	Tanya Dziahileva	David Roemer
July	Shannan Click	David Roemer
August	Cameron Diaz	Regan Cameron
September	Coco Rocha	Tesh
October	Anja Rubik	Marcin Tyszka
November	Eva Herzigová	Marcin Tyszka
December	Alessandra Ambrosio	Stewart Shining

=== 2011 ===
Issue	Cover model	Photographer
January	Natalia Vodianova	Mert & Marcus
February	Evan Rachel Wood	James White
March	Siri Tollerød	David Roemer
April	Crystal Renn	David Roemer
May	Cindy Crawford	Tesh
June	Kim Noorda	Marcin Tyszka
July	Zuzanna Bijoch	Marcin Tyszka
August	Tiiu Kuik	Mike Filinow
September	Anna Jagodzińska; Isabeli Fontana	Marcin Tyszka
September	Enikő Mihalik	Regan Cameron
October	Julian Schratter; Julia Stegner; Ryan Kennedy	David Roemer
November	Maryna Linchuk	David Roemer
December	Magdalena Frackowiak	David Roemer

=== 2012 ===
Issue	Cover model	Photographer
January	Bianca Balti	Marcin Tyszka
February	Constance Jablonski	Jean-Francois Campos
March	Angela Lindvall	Jean-Francois Campos
April	Ginta Lapiņa	Nagi Sakai
May	Crystal Renn	Nagi Sakai
June	Karolína Kurková	Mariano Vivanco
July	Anne Vyalitsyna	David Roemer
August	Kasia Struss	David Roemer
September	Carmen Kass	Koray Birand
October	Hilary Rhoda	Nagi Sakai
November	Aline Weber	Nagi Sakai
December	Coco Rocha	Regan Cameron

=== 2013 ===
Issue	Cover model	Photographer
January	Jacquelyn Jablonski	David Roemer
February	Toni Garrn	Nagi Sakai
March	Isabeli Fontana	Koray Birand
April	Hana Jiříčková	Koray Birand
May	Anja Rubik	Marcin Tyszka
June	Mirte Maas	Nagi Sakai
July	Zuzanna Bijoch	Marcin Tyszka
August	Anna de Rijk	Alique
September	Candice Swanepoel	Mariano Vivanco
October	Kendra Spears	Koray Birand
November	Behati Prinsloo	David Roemer
December	Scarlett Johansson	Sofia Sanchez & Mauro Mongiello

=== 2014 ===
Issue	Cover model	Photographer
January	Irina Shayk	David Roemer
February	Anna Selezneva	Nagi Sakai
March	Enikő Mihalik	Yu Tsai
April	Karolína Kurková	David Roemer
May	Arizona Muse	Nagi Sakai
June	Isabeli Fontana	Terry Richardson
July	Lily Aldridge	James Macari
August	Monika Jagaciak	James Macari
September	Toni Garrn	James Macari
October	Cameron Russell; Frankie Rayder; Guinevere Van Seenus; Irina Shayk; Karen Elson	Alexi Lubomirski
November	Rosie Huntington-Whiteley	James Macari
December	Issa Lish	Alexei Hay

=== 2015 ===
Issue	Cover model	Photographer
January	Julia Frauche	Nagi Sakai
February	Eva Longoria	Stockton Johnson
March	Edita Vilkevičiūtė	Gilles Bensimon
April	Catherine McNeil	James Macari
May	Kate King	Martin Lidell
June	Amanda Wellsh	Jacques Dequeker
July	Adriana Lima	Russell James
August	Magdalena Frackowiak	David Bellemere
September	Joan Smalls	Russell James
October	Alma Jodorowsky	Alvaro Beamud Cortés
November	Karmen Pedaru	David Roemer
December	Karlie Kloss	Russell James

=== 2016 ===
Issue	Cover model	Photographer
January	Emily DiDonato	David Roemer
February	Blanca Padilla	Alvaro Beamud Cortés
March	Mariacarla Boscono	Nico Bustos
April	Ysaunny Brito	Jacques Dequeker
May	Taylor Hill	Terry Tsiolis
June	Cora Emmanuel	Alvaro Beamud Cortés
July	Ophélie Guillermand	Hunter & Gatti
August	Cameron Russell	Will Davidson
September	Andreea Diaconu	Gilles Bensimon
October	Karlie Kloss	Chris Colls
November	Kati Nescher; Nadja Bender	Chris Colls
December	Małgosia Bela	Will Davidson

=== 2017 ===
Issue	Cover model	Photographer
January	Joan Smalls; Mariana Zaragoza	Jason Kibbler
February	Anja Rubik	Chris Colls
March	Grace Hartzel	Michael Thompson
April	Adwoa Aboah	Giampaolo Sgura
May	Lara Stone	Giampaolo Sgura
June	Edita Vilkevičiūtė	Chris Colls
June	Luisana Gonzalez	Miguel Reveriego
July	Dilone	Katja Rahlwes
August	Andreea Diaconu	Chris Colls
August	Carolyn Murphy	Will Davidson
September	Lineisy Montero	Ben Weller
October	Hana Jiříčková	Sebastian Kim
October	Irina Shayk	Jason Kibbler
November	Sasha Pivovarova	Paola Kudacki
December	Grace Elizabeth	Patrick Demarchelier

=== 2018 ===
Issue	Cover model	Photographer
January	Lexi Boling	Nicolas Kantor
January	Othilia Simon	Chris Colls
February	Chiara Scelsi	Quentin de Briey
February	Yasmin Wijnaldum & Jon Kortajarena	Giampaolo Sgura
March	Camila Cabello	Alexi Lubomirski
April	Hiandra Martinez; Lineisy Montero & Luisana Gonzalez	Paola Kudacki
May	Camila Morrone	Luca & Alessandro Morelli
May	Mariacarla Boscono	Stas Komarovski
June	Madison Headrick; Sara Sampaio	Giampaolo Sgura
July	Bella Hadid	Chris Colls
August	Andreea Diaconu	Giampaolo Sgura
August	Martina Stoessel	Victor Demarchelier
September	Birgit Kos; Hailey Bieber (née Baldwin)	Bjorn Iooss
October	Emily Ratajkowski	Carin Backoff
November	Salma Hayek	Alexi Lubomirski
December	Luna Bijl	Chris Colls

=== 2019 ===
Issue	Cover model	Photographer
January	Irina Shayk	An Le
January	Yalitza Aparicio	Santiago & Mauricio
February	Eiza González	Ben Hassett
February	Lineisy Montero	Stas Komarovski
March	Lali Espósito	Guy Aroch
March	Taylor Hill	Phil Poynter
April	Litza Veloz	Carlijn Jacobs
April	Paloma Elsesser	Cass Bird
May	Christy Turlington	Alique
May	Marina de Tavira	Santiago & Mauricio
June	Gigi Hadid	Giampaolo Sgura
July	Charlotte Casiraghi	Chris Colls
July	Natalia Montero	Bjorn iooss
August	Rosalía	Stefan Ruiz
August	Sofia Reyes	Tania Franco Klein
September	Cristina Piccone; Mariana Zaragoza; Sara Esparza; Issa Lish	Santiago & Mauricio
September	Licett Morillo; Manuela Sanchez; Annibelis Baez; Ambar Cristal	Ben Weller
October	Abigail Mendoza & her family Frida Escobedo; Mood board of art	David Abrahams
October	Cholitas of Bolivia	Yumna Al-Arashi
October	Elisa Carrillo Cabrera; Irene Azuela	Sharif Hamza
October	Juana Burga	Santiago Sierra
October	María Lorena Ramírez	Rena Effendi
October	Nature of Chile	George Steinmetz
October	Natalia Reyes	Michael Gannon
November	Adria Arjona	Alexi Lubomirski
November	Chiara Parravicini	David Ferrua
December	Kerolyn Soares	Tim Walker

== 2020s ==
=== 2020 ===
Issue	Cover model	Photographer
January	Licett Morillo	
February	Amber Valletta	Javiera Eyzaguirre
March	Cynthia Arrebola	Javiera Eyzaguirre
April	Joan Smalls; Bad Bunny; J Balvin	Gorka Postigo Breedveld
May/June	Sarita Jaccard	Tom Craig
July	Limber Martínez	Isaac Contreras
August	Nora Attal	Emma Summerton
September	Ámbar Cristal Zarzuela; Hiandra Martinez	Renell Medrano
September	Natalia Lafourcade; Vanessa Romo; Daniela Soto-Innes	Mauricio Sierra
October	Ana de Armas	Alique
November	Christian Serratos	Olivia Malone
December 2020/January 2021	Selena Gomez	Dario Calmese

=== 2021 ===
Issue	Cover model	Photographer
February	Thalía	Bjorn Ioss
March	Taylor Hill	Chris Colls
April	Demi Lovato	Art Streiber
May	Quannah Chasinghorse	Inez and Vinoodh
June	Mica Argañaraz	Inez and Vinoodh
July	Shakira	Nico Bustos
August	Alessandra Ambrosio	Emma Summerton
September	Cynthia Arrebola; Kerolyn Soares; Melissa Barrera	Emma Summerton
October	Anya Taylor-Joy	Camila Falquez
November	Tindi Mar	Sonia Szóstak
December 2021/January 2022	Arca	Tim Walker

=== 2022 ===
Issue	Cover model	Photographer
February	Eiza Gonzalez	Alique
March	Karol G	Emmanuel Monsalve
April	Lineisy Montero; Devyn Garcia; Celeste Romero; Krini Hernandez; Mavaro M Tindi Mar	Emma Summerton
May	Salma Hayek & Valentina Paloma Pinault	Nico Bustos
June	Millie Bobby Brown	Claudia Knoepfel
July	Adria Arjona	Bryce Anderson
July	Imaan Hammam	Alique
August	Gloria Estefan & Emily Estefan	Alexander Saladrigas
September	Anitta	Rafael Martinez
October	Camila Cabello	Ricardo Ramos
November	América González	Emmanuel Sanchez Monsalve
December 2022/January 2023	Zoe Saldaña	Yulia Gorbachenko

=== 2023 ===
Issue	Cover model	Photographer
February	Macarena Achaga	Enrique Leyva
March	Kali Uchis	Micaiah Carter
April	Irina Shayk, Tindi Mar	Inez and Vinoodh
May	Eva Longoria	Alexi Lubomirski
June	Anna Ewers	Inez and Vinoodh
July	America Ferrera	Evanie Frausto
August	Alessandra Ambroiso	Blair Getz Mezibov
September	Cardi B	Vittorio Zunino Celotto
November	Celeste-Lopez Romero, Anekne Zaldivar	Emmanuel Lubezki
November	Unknown	Graciela Iturbide
December	Paloma Elsesser	Camila Falquez

=== 2024 ===
Issue	Cover model	Photographer
January	Selena Gomez	Michael Bailey-Gates
February	Georgina Rodríguez	Javier Biosca
March	Christy Turlington; Angelina Kendall; Mahany Pery; Raquel Zimmermann; Sara Caballero; Conie Vallese	Inez and Vinoodh
April	Belinda	Emmanuel Sanchez Monsalve
April	Camila Morrone	Zoey Grossman
May	Camila Mendes	Zoey Grossman
June	Amelia Gray, Mathilda Gvarliani	Inez and Vinoodh
July	Karla Souza	Stefan Ruiz
August	Loreto Peralta	Ward Ivan Rafik
August	Esmeralda Pimentel	Diego Bendezu
September	Gael García Bernal, Eiza González, Diego Luna	Sharif Hamza
October	Eva Mendes	Emma Summerton
November	Karla Sofía Gascón	Camila Falquez
December	Angelina Jolie	Dan Martensen

=== 2025 ===
Issue	Cover model	Photographer
January	Maria Klaumann	Blair Getz Mezibov
February	Cameron Diaz	Norman Jean Roy
March	Rachel Zegler	Inez & Vinoodh
April	Angelina Kendall	Inez & Vinoodh
May	Bad Bunny	Sebastián Faena
June	Ester Expósito	Karla Lisker
July	Gracie Abrams	Sebastián Faena
July	Ella McCutcheon	Inez & Vinoodh
August	Daiane Sodre	Anne Menke
August	Isabeli Fontana	Zee Nunes
September	Jenna Ortega	Paola Kudacki
October	America Ferrera	Emmanuel Sanchez Monsalve
October	Paulina Dávila	Stefan Ruiz
November	Karol G	Norman Jean Roy
December	Zoe Saldaña	Diego Bendezu

=== 2026 ===
Issue	Cover model	Photographer
January	Cindy Crawford	Noua Unu
February	Ariana Grande	Michael Bailey-Gates
March	Danna	Dan Martensen
April	Camila Morrone	Paola Kudacki
April	Joan Smalls	Diego Bendezu
May	Sara Caballero	Hans Neumann
June	Aneken Zaldivar	Diego Vourakis
July	Eiza González	Diego Bendezu
August	Belinda	Karla Lisker
August	Belinda	Willy Lukaitis
September	Adria Arjona	Gregory Harris
October	Gabbriette	Pia Riverola
November	Renata Notni	Camila Falquez
