= Anna Bella Geiger =

Brazilian artist and professor

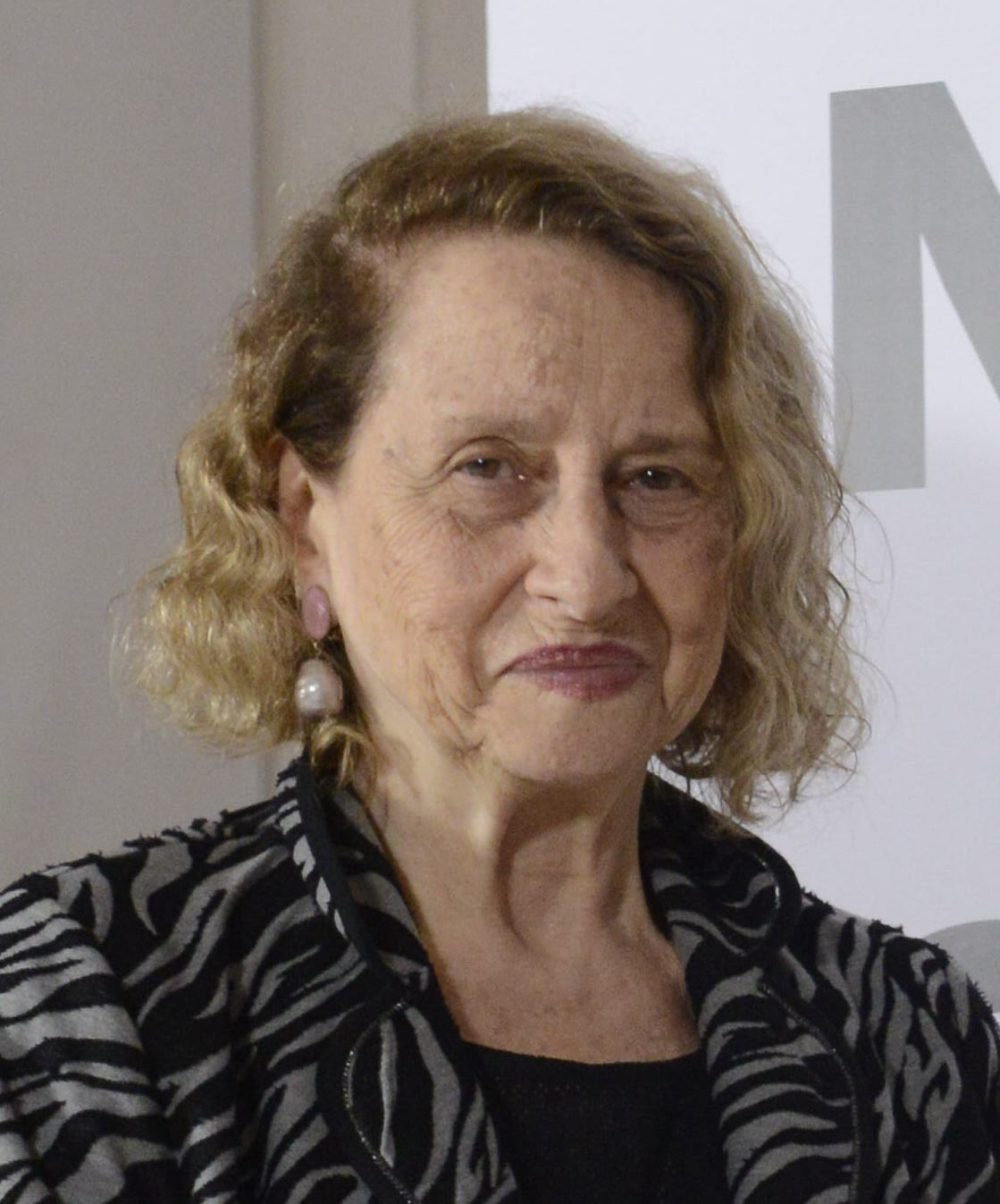
- Geiger in 2016
- Born: 1933 (age 92–93); Rio de Janeiro
- Education: Instituto Fayga Ostrower, Rio de Janeiro.
- Known for: engraving, assemblage art, painting, drawing, photography.

Anna Bella Geiger (born 1933, Rio de Janeiro, Brazil) is a Brazilian multi-disciplinary artist of Jewish-Polish ancestry, and professor at the Escola de Artes Visuais do Parque Lage. She lives in Rio de Janeiro, and her work, characterized by the use of different media, is held by galleries and private collections in the US, China, Brazil and Europe.

== Biography ==
Her parents were raised in Ostrowiec Świętokrzyski, Poland. They moved to Brazil ten years before her birth. Her father was a craftsman.

Geiger first graduated in literature and language from Federal University of Rio de Janeiro, and later in the 1950s, studied art at Rio's Instituto Fayga Ostrower. In 1950, at the age of seventeen, she participated in her first exhibition at the Salão Nacional de Belas Artes in Rio de Janeiro. She moved to New York in 1954 where she took classes in Art History at the Metropolitan Museum of Art, returning to Rio the following year. In 1965 she attended an engraving workshop at the Museo de Arte Moderno, where she began teaching three years later. She returned to New York in 1969 to teach at Columbia University, returning again to Rio in 1970.

In the 1970s Geiger, an abstract artist, began to include representational elements into her work, and use photographic engraving, photomontage, assemblage, sculpture, and video. In the 1980s she concentrated on painting, and in the early 1990s on cartographic imagery cast in metal, and iron archive box constructions incorporating plaited metals and hot-wax painting (encaustic). Besides painting and engraving, her current work combines Installation art with video. In Rio in 2006, Geiger constructed an installation, Circe, that included a scale model of Ancient Egyptian ruins and performance video; the installation was recreated in 2009.

In 1983 Geiger became a Fellow of the John Simon Guggenheim Memorial Foundation.

== Publications and collections ==
Geiger's works are held in the collections of the Museum of Modern Art, New York; the Victoria and Albert Museum, London; Centre Georges Pompidou, Paris; the Fogg Museum, Cambridge; The Getty Foundation, Los Angeles; the Pérez Art Museum Miami, Florida; Museu Serralves, Porto; Frankfurter Kunstverein, Frankfurt; the Museo Nacional Centro de Arte Reina Sofía, Madrid; the Museum of Contemporary Art, Chicago; and the National Museum of Women in the Arts, Washington D.C. Exhibitions of her work have been held in London, Tokyo, Warsaw, Ottawa, Portugal and Puerto Rico.

Geiger's 1978 "A Pao Nosso de Cada Dia", (Our Daily Bread,) original photographic postcard of which there are five exemplars, are held at the Blanton Museum of Art Austin, Texas Tepper Takayama Fine Arts, Boston, Massachusetts, and the Harvard Fogg Museum. Her prints are also held in the Museu Nacional de Belas Artes, and the Museum of Contemporary Art, Niterói.

In 1987, Geiger, with art critic professor Fernando Cocchiarale, published "Abstracionismo Geometrico e Informal: a vanguard brasileira nos anos cinquenta" (Informal and Geometric Abstraction: the Brazilian avant-garde in the fifties).

In 2005, Geiger's work was included in the electronic journal Confraria do Vento, edited by Márcio-André, Victor Paes, and Ronaldo Ferrito, in collaboration with the graduate department of the Universidade Federal do Rio de Janeiro.

In 2025, Geiger's work was included in the international group exhibition Narratives in Focus: Selections from PAMM's Collection at the Pérez Art Museum Miami alongside artworks by Njaimeh Njie, Athi-Patra Ruga, Sarah Charlesworth, River Claure, Mary Sibande, Joiri Minaya, Camila Falquez, and Widline Cadet, among others.
