= Lindley Darden =

Philosopher of science

Lindley Darden (born 1945) is a contemporary philosopher of science, with a research focus on the philosophy of biology.

== Biography ==
She received her Ph.D. from the University of Chicago in 1974 and B.A. in 1968 from Rhodes College, and is currently Distinguished Scholar Teacher at the University of Maryland. Between 2001 and 2003, she was the president of the International Society for the History, Philosophy, and Social Studies of Biology.

== Research ==
Darden's research has led to the publication of several books. In her 1991 book, Theory Change in Science, Darden argues, contra Kuhn, that science is a self-correcting enterprise which progresses through a thoroughly piecemeal process of "reiterative refinement," consisting of three stages: (1) theory construction, (2) theory assessment, and (3) theory modification. Although there are similarities between stages (1) and (2) and the traditionally recognized contexts of scientific discovery and justification, Darden argues that her stages are not easily mapped onto this dichotomy.

Furthermore, Darden attempts to illumine the "mysterious" process of constructing scientific theories by positing various "strategies" that she claims are sufficient for solving actual historical cases of theory change. For example, Darden examines the Mendelian "Theory of the Gene," which underwent significant theoretical modifications from around 1900 (when Mendel was "rediscovered") to 1926 (when Thomas Hunt Morgan published his famous textbook defining Mendelian theory in its roughly modern form). Looking at these cases, Darden describes procedures for devising the hypotheses that early twentieth-century Mendelian theorists actually proposed, although she does not claim that these theorists actually employed such procedures, or strategies. Ultimately, by constructing a list of such strategies for discovery, Darden hopes that scientists can use them to solve present theoretical problems that contemporary science encounters. As such, she advises scientists to use them, calling her model "advisory" (rather than "descriptive" or "normative").

Darden has also worked on mechanisms, notably in her collaborative paper entitled "Thinking about Mechanisms" (2000), co-authored with Peter Machamer and Carl Craver. In 2006, Darden completed her second book, entitled Reasoning in Biological Discoveries: Essays on Mechanisms, Interfield Relations, and Anomaly Resolution. In it, Darden propounds a number of strategies for discovering mechanisms in biology, including "Schema Instantiation," "Modular Subassembly," and "Forward/Backward Chaining."
