= Mechanism (biology) =

System of causally interacting parts and processes

In biology, a mechanism is a system of causally interacting parts and processes that produce one or more effects. Phenomena can be explained by describing their mechanisms. For example, natural selection is a mechanism of evolution; other mechanisms of evolution include genetic drift, mutation, and gene flow. In ecology, mechanisms such as predation and host-parasite interactions produce change in ecological systems. In practice, no description of a mechanism is ever complete because not all details of the parts and processes of a mechanism are fully known. For example, natural selection is a mechanism of evolution that includes countless, inter-individual interactions with other individuals, components, and processes of the environment in which natural selection operates.

== Characterizations/ definitions ==
Many characterizations/definitions of mechanisms in the philosophy of science/biology have been provided in the past decades. For example, one influential characterization of neuro- and molecular biological mechanisms by Peter K. Machamer, Lindley Darden and Carl Craver is as follows: mechanisms are entities and activities organized such that they are productive of regular changes from start to termination conditions. Other characterizations have been proposed by Stuart Glennan (1996, 2002), who articulates an interactionist account of mechanisms, and William Bechtel (1993, 2006), who emphasizes parts and operations.

The characterization by Machemer et al. is as follows: mechanisms are entities and activities organized such that they are predictive of changes from start conditions to termination conditions. There are three distinguishable aspects of this characterization:

Ontic aspect
The ontic constituency of biological mechanisms includes entities and activities. Thus, this conception postulates a dualistic ontology of mechanisms, where entities are substantial components, and activities are reified components of mechanisms. This augmented ontology increases the explanatory power of this conception.

Descriptive aspect
Most descriptions of mechanisms (as found in the scientific literature) include specifications of the entities and activities involved, as well as the start and termination conditions. This aspect is mostly limited to linear mechanisms, which have relatively unambiguous beginning and end points between which they produce their phenomenon, although it may be possible to arbitrarily select such points in cyclical mechanisms (e.g., the Krebs cycle).

Epistemic aspect
Mechanisms are dynamic producers of phenomena. This conception emphasizes activities, which are causes that are reified. It is because of activities that this conception of mechanisms is able to capture the dynamicity of mechanisms as they bring about a phenomenon.

== Analysis ==
Mechanisms in science/biology have reappeared as a subject of philosophical analysis and discussion in the last several decades because of a variety of factors, many of which relate to metascientific issues such as explanation and causation. For example, the decline of Covering Law (CL) models of explanation, e.g., Hempel's deductive-nomological model, has stimulated interest how mechanisms might play an explanatory role in certain domains of science, especially higher-level disciplines such as biology (i.e., neurobiology, molecular biology, neuroscience, and so on). This is not just because of the philosophical problem of giving some account of what "laws of nature," which CL models encounter, but also the incontrovertible fact that most biological phenomena are not characterizable in nomological terms (i.e., in terms of lawful relationships). For example, protein biosynthesis does not occur according to any law, and therefore, on the DN model, no explanation for the biosynthesis phenomenon could be given.

== Explanations ==
Mechanistic explanations come in many forms. Wesley Salmon proposed what he called the "ontic" conception of explanation, which states that explanations are mechanisms and causal processes in the world. There are two such kinds of explanation: etiological and constitutive. Salmon focused primarily on etiological explanation, with respect to which one explains some phenomenon P by identifying its causes (and, thus, locating it within the causal structure of the world). Constitutive (or componential) explanation, on the other hand, involves describing the components of a mechanism M that is productive of (or causes) P. Indeed, whereas (a) one may differentiate between descriptive and explanatory adequacy, where the former is characterized as the adequacy of a theory to account for at least all the items in the domain (which need explaining), and the latter as the adequacy of a theory to account for no more than those domain items, and (b) past philosophies of science differentiate between descriptions of phenomena and explanations of those phenomena, in the non-ontic context of mechanism literature, descriptions and explanations seem to be identical. This is to say, to explain a mechanism M is to describe it (specify its components, as well as background, enabling, and so on, conditions that constitute, in the case of a linear mechanism, its "start conditions").

== See also ==
- Aristotle's biology
