= Heinz Endowments =

Philanthropic organization in the United States

The Heinz Endowments is a philanthropic organization in the United States, and was formed with the combined support from two smaller, private foundations: the Howard Heinz Endowment and the Vira I. Heinz Endowment. It awards more than $60 million annually in grants to a range of nonprofit organizations.

== Mission ==
The Heinz Endowments "seeks to help [its] region thrive as a whole and just community, and through that work to model solutions to major national and global challenges," and concentrates "on advancing a sustainable future for our community and planet, successful learning outcomes for young people and their families, and a culture of engaged creativity for all our citizens."

== History ==
Based in Pittsburgh, Pennsylvania the Heinz Endowments consists of two private foundations: the Howard Heinz Endowment and the Vira I. Heinz Endowment. The Howard Heinz Endowment was established in 1941 via a bequeath from the residual estate of Howard Heinz (1877-1941), a native of Sharpsburg, Pennsylvania who had served as president of the H. J. Heinz Co. The Vira I. Heinz Endowment was formed via funding from the estate of Vira I. Heinz, the first woman to serve on the board of directors of a multinational corporation headquartered in Pittsburgh (the H. J. Heinz Co.), the first woman to serve on the board of trustees of Carnegie Mellon University, and the founder of the Pittsburgh Civic Light Opera.

== Leadership ==
In 2014, former Pittsburgh Foundation president and CEO Grant Oliphant became president of the Endowments. He had been associated with the Heinz family since joining the staff of U.S. Senator H. John Heinz III in 1988 and had served the Heinz Endowments in management roles before helming the Pittsburgh Foundation. Oliphant served as president until 2023, when he was succeeded by Chris DeCardy.

== Grantmaking ==
On July 1, 2019, the organization announced the launch of its "Just Arts Initiative," a grantmaking program to support artists and art organizations responding to pressing social issues facing the Pittsburgh area. Initial plans called for the organization to award grants in the range of $1,000 to $150,000 per individual project with a total outlay for the initiative expected to reach $500,000. According to news reports, the initiative "will give funding priority to projects that focus on the voices of communities and residents most directly affected by injustice and encourages submissions from young people or that focuses on youth voices. Prior to that announcement, in June 2019, newspapers reported that fifteen artists were named as recipients of $169,000 in grant funding provided by the Heinz Endowments in collaboration with The Pittsburgh Foundation.

The fifteen artists receiving support were: Cameron Barnett (poetry), Asia Bey (graphic novel), Children's Museum of Pittsburgh (artist residency with Seth Clark), Shikeith Cathey (photography, sculpture and video), Kevin Clancy (gallery exhibit of multidisciplinary works), Anthony DePaolis (jazz music composition and recording), Phillip Andrew Lewis (development of a living, sustainable sculptural installation with greenhouse), Clayton Merrell (visual art exploration of global ecology), Njaimeh Njie (production of documentary about Blackness in Rust Belt cities), Mikael Owunna (photography book focused on LGBTQ African migrants), Adriana Ramirez (research and manuscript completion of a book regarding the history of violence in the Americas "from Pittsburgh to Colombia and back"), Martha Rial (Millvale expansion of the mural project "Beyond the Ceiling"), Anjali Sachdeva (development of a new novel), Joy-Marie Thompson (new live contemporary dance project), and Anna Thompson and Taylor Knight (touring and premier of a new multidisciplinary performance work, "empathy machine").

== See also ==
- Drue Heinz
- Heinz Foundations
