= Music therapy for non-fluent aphasia =

Music therapy for non-fluent aphasia is a method for treating patients who have lost the ability to speak after a stroke or accident. Non-fluent aphasia, also called expressive aphasia, is a neurological disorder that deprives patients of the ability to express language. It is usually caused by stroke or lesions in Broca's area, which is a language-dominant area that is responsible for speech production located in the left hemisphere of the brain. However, when lesions form in Broca's area this only affects patients’ speech ability, while their ability to sing remains unaffected. Since several studies have shown that right hemispheric regions are more active during singing, music therapy involving melodic elements is deemed to be a potential treatment for non-fluent aphasia, as singing might activate patients’ right hemisphere to compensate with their lesioned left hemisphere. Aside from singing, many other music therapy techniques have also been attempted such as rhythms and poetic emphasis, which is shown to add to the effectiveness. Although there are many possible explanations for the mechanism of music therapy, the underlying mechanism remains unclear, as some studies indicate contradictory results.

== Techniques ==
=== Therapeutic singing ===
A common method of therapeutic singing is guiding patients to sing familiar songs. Patients are led to sing these familiar songs along with their therapists. Each therapist needs to be cognoscente of what would be familiar to the patients. Having someone in their 70's be asked to sing a Taylor Swift song, would not be deemed appropriate. The therapist also might need to adjust the tempo, volume, and pitch of the songs according to each individual patient. By doing this, it helps someone who might be a struggling to formulate thoughts and words quickly have time to catch up. This can optimize the therapy process. The lyrics that patients can most easily produce are repeated several times. The utilization of singing during the treatment of aphasia is not a novel therapy technique, as in the past therapists already noticed that patients who had difficulty speaking were still able to sing.

=== Vocal intonation ===
To begin is it needed to define what vocal Intonation. In its simplest terms, it is the rise and fall of voicing at the end of questions, and or statements to convey a meaning, or a mood and anything else that will help the listeners understand what your intentions are. Vocal intonation is introduced to make aphasic patients intentionally exaggerate the intonation of daily phrases. The most well-known application of vocal intonation in music therapy is Melodic Intonation Therapy (MIT). MIT was developed when researchers noticed a pattern which spanned 100 years of observation, it showed patients with aphasia were far better able to sing then to speak in sentences.

When receiving MIT, patients intone phrases with 2–3 syllables on only two pitches, which are determined by the natural prosody of phrases. Stressed syllables are intoned on a higher pitch, while unstressed syllables are intoned on a lower pitch. However, various intonation in daily conversational phrases may be used, so patients can practice communicating different meanings through different intonation. In addition, body cues, such as head or hand movement, may be used to help patients perceive different pitch in vocal intonation.

=== Dynamically cued singing ===
Dynamically cued singing was also used by therapists a long time ago. Therapists will guide patients to finish an incomplete sentence by singing the name of a designated object, such as “hand” if a therapist points to a patient’s hand. Additionally, dynamically cued singing can be employed together with singing familiar songs. Therapists may pause at the end of each phrase of a song to let patients finish the phrase by singing. This technique creates a strong interpersonal interaction that not only enhances patients’ motivation to participate, but also offers a circumstance similar to real conversation that benefits patients’ skills outside of music.

=== Breathing into syllable sound ===
At beginning, therapists will ask patients to focus on breathing single-syllable sounds only. The effect of this technique is enhanced if therapists can guide patients to produce the sounds with their natural breathing patterns that help them relax, such as yawning, signing, or cleaning voices. Later on, patients will be encouraged to develop the breathing sounds into pitched sounds. Hand movement may be used to help patients synchronize syllable sounds with exhaling. Usually, the single-syllable sounds begin from vowels to consonants. But it is also suggested that the procedure should be from bilabial sounds (i.e. /m/, /b/), tongue-tip sounds (i.e. /n/, /d/), to tongue-base sounds (i.e. /g/, /k/).

=== Musically assisted speech ===
Patients will produce conversational phrases with melodies that the patients are familiar with to practice the real conversation that the patients may need in their daily life. This technique leads to more successful outcomes if original lyrics of the melodies are presented before the melodies are associated with conversational phrases. The method was also conducted by therapists more than 40 years ago and indicated to be effective. Keith and Aronson had recorded that their stroke patient rehabilitated from aphasia by singing simple conversational phrases to communicate with people.

=== Rhythmic speech cueing ===
Rhythmic speech cueing is one of the essential components in MIT, which requires patients to use their left hand to tap each syllable of the intoned phrases. In general, therapists will guide patients to clap or tap the speech rhythm to phrases obtained from song lyrics, conversations, or any resources related to the immediate context. Instead of left-hand tapping, clapping or beating a drum are also possible alternatives. Rhythmic cueing speed, which has been shown to be more crucial than the melody, will correspond to the patients’ speech speed, prosodic rhythms of the phrases, or musical rhythms of the lyrics, depending on the circumstances of each individual and the types of phrases.

=== Oral motor exercises ===
This technique aims to improve the oral motor formation of patients. Therapists will demonstrate their mouth and tongue movements in an exaggerated way when singing a song, and ask patients to imitate the exaggerated oral movements. Patients tend to have better performance if therapists coordinate their exaggerated expressions to match the rhythm of the lyrics that are being practiced. Feedback will be given by therapists to allow patients to imitate the movements as identically as possible by repeated practices and correction.

=== Inner rehearsal ===
When employing this technique, therapists first hum a melody, and then sing words with the melody while tapping patients’ hand. Therapists will ask patients to hear the words with melody "inside". If patients have difficulty understanding how to do it, they will be asked to imagine hearing the melody of "Happy Birthday" or their parents’ voice saying "Do your homework". After patients understand the concept, they will be asked to hear themselves singing the words inside their brain along with therapists when therapists are singing to them. Through this technique, patients can establish an auditory target to compare the overtly produced phrases to their covertly produced phrases. Mastering this skill, patients will be able to create their own auditory target phrases, and transfer these phrases into expressive speech without much assistance from therapists.

=== Auditory-motor feedback training ===
The purpose of this technique is the same as that of inner rehearsal: to allow patients to gain independence from the assistance of therapists. The technique aims to train patients to hear the difference between the target phrases sung by therapists and the phrases produced by themselves. The target phrases can be those they create by using inner rehearsal. After mastering this technique, patients will be able to correct their production of phrases on their own whenever they practice singing words.

== Benefits ==
The effectiveness of traditional speech therapy tends to be limited by patients’ poor attention and poor motivation, while music therapy can have better therapeutical effects by boosting patients’ willingness to participate in therapy process. Music therapy can also improve non-fluent aphasic patients’ breathing and vocal ability, articulation and prosody of speech, and verbal and non-verbal communicative behaviours.

In addition, music therapy gives confidence to non-fluent aphasic patients and reduces their frustrated feelings. At first, non-fluent aphasic patients may find it difficult to accept the fact that they cannot speak as they previously did anymore and suffer from depression. Nevertheless, once the patients discover that they are still able to sing some sentences after receiving music therapy, they will be more confident and less frustrated. Moreover, as words in singing are pronounced more slowly than in speaking, patients can be more fluent when singing words because they have more time to distinguish the phonemes composed of those words.

== Mechanisms ==
Although people who suffer from non-fluent aphasia lose their speech ability, their ability to sing is often preserved. Their preserved ability to sing might result from their preserved brain circuit for singing lyrics, which suggests that singing and speaking involve different neural pathway in human brain. As non-fluent aphasia is usually caused by lesions in patients’ left hemisphere, the undamaged right hemisphere is regarded by researchers as the reason why patients preserve their ability to sing (Jeffries et al., 2003). Patients who undergo brain imaging scan also show an increased right hemispheric activity when they are singing than speaking. Therefore, the substitution of the right hemisphere for the damaged left hemisphere is one of the possible mechanisms of music therapy for non-fluent aphasia.

In terms of the training of the right hemisphere, music therapy techniques involving melodic components, such as singing and vocal intonation, are often a topic of discussion by researchers. Since pitch difference in language is perceived by the right hemisphere, singing or intoning phrases may allow patients to use the neural pathway in their right hemisphere. As many patients have been noted to have an improvement in speech production after receiving therapeutic singing or vocal intonation practice, some researchers have suggested these techniques are able to activate their right hemispheric regions which have been potentially shown as being responsible for language processing.

Although many studies suggest that singing in music therapy can improve non-fluent aphasic patients’ speech production, the study by Stahl et al. shows that rhythm, instead of singing, is the key element in music therapy that benefits aphasic patients. Therefore, rhythmic components in music therapy might explain why music therapy can benefit non-fluent aphasic patients. One example is the left-hand tapping used in Melodic Intonation Therapy (MIT). Since this technique also serves as a way to stimulate the right hemisphere, Schlaug et al. speculate that left-hand tapping may favor verbal production indirectly. They further propose that hand movements and articulation might share a mutual neurological network in the right hemisphere because hand movements are often in a tight relationship with one's articulation in daily life. Therefore, left-hand tapping is likely to benefit aphasic patients' articulation by engaging the neurological network that coordinates both hand movement and articulatory movement in patients’ right hemisphere.

== Challenges for future studies ==
Even though many studies have proposed the possible neural mechanism of music therapy for non-fluent aphasia, many crucial questions are still unanswered. For example, in contrast to the idea that non-fluent aphasic patients’ ability to sing is due to their undamaged right hemisphere, other studies suggest that speaking and singing words are based on the same neural mechanisms. Therefore, patients’ better performance on singing words might result from their long-term memories for familiar lyrics.

In addition, in spite of some research results indicating that MIT can activate regions potentially responsible for language processing in aphasic patients’ right hemisphere, some studies obtain completely opposite results. Belin et al.’s study showed that Broca's area and the adjacent regions in aphasic patients’ left hemisphere were activated after patients received MIT, while no activation was observed in the right hemisphere. Contrarily, they observed activation in patients’ right hemisphere when patients underwent word repetition tasks without MIT; they interpreted the right hemispheric activation as the persistence of aphasia, instead of cortical reorganization. Unfortunately, these currently conflicting research results demonstrate that the underlying mechanism of music therapy remains unclear. If the neural mechanism of music therapy cannot be elucidated, the effective application of these techniques will remain hard to achieve.

Another challenge for the research on music therapy is how to design the studies. Although many studies have illustrated positive effects of music therapy on non-fluent aphasia, these studies tend to be case studies with small sample size. Moreover, these studies usually lack control conditions and randomized design. Therefore, Van der Meulen et al. strongly urge in their article that Randomized Controlled Trials (RCTs) are needed to examine the effectiveness of music therapy.

Sustaining the treatment effectiveness of music therapy over the long term is also a challenge for its application on non-fluent aphasia. To overcome this barrier, two techniques, inner rehearsal and auditory-motor feedback training, are introduced to help patients gain independence from the assistance of music therapists. However, related studies of the two techniques are still limited. Future studies that are able to take in larger sample populations, to compare the many different results are required to fully understand the efficacy and potential applications of the two techniques.

== See also ==
- Transcortical sensory aphasia
- Wernicke's aphasia
