= Gualtiero Piccinini =

Italian–American philosopher (born 1970)

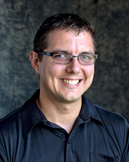
- Born: November 11, 1970 (age 55); Italy

Education
- Education: University of Pittsburgh

Philosophical work
- Era: Contemporary philosophy
- Region: Western philosophy
- School: Analytic
- Institutions: University of Missouri, Columbia; University of Missouri–St. Louis; Washington University in St. Louis
- Main interests: Philosophy of mind Mind Sciences; Philosophy of language
- Notable ideas: Mechanistic account of computation Neural computation Integrating psychology and neuroscience

Gualtiero Piccinini (born 1970) is an Italian–American philosopher known for his work on the nature of mind and computation as well as on how to integrate psychology and neuroscience. He is the Florence G. Kline Professor of Philosophy and Curators' Distinguished Professor in the Philosophy Department at the University of Missouri, Columbia.

== Background ==
Piccinini was born and raised in Italy, and studied philosophy and cognitive science at the University of Turin, from which he earned a Bachelor of Arts, and graduated cum laude. He then went to graduate school at University of Pittsburgh, specializing in the history and philosophy of science. Upon completion of his Ph.D. in 2003, he held the position of "James S. McDonnell Post Doctoral Research Fellow" at the PNP (Philosophy, Neuroscience, and Psychology) program at Washington University in St. Louis. He started as an assistant professor at the University of Missouri, St. Louis, in 2005 and received early tenure and promotion to associate professor in 2010 and early promotion to full professor in 2014. From 2011 to 2014 he was the Chair of the Philosophy Department at the university. From 2015 to 2024, Piccinini was the Associate Director of the Center for Neurodynamics and an Affiliate in Gender Studies at the University of Missouri–St. Louis. He held the title of Curators' Distinguished Professor at the same university from 2019 to 2024.

Piccinini has served as a visiting professor several times in his career, including at Washington University in St. Louis in spring 2015, a fellow at Institute for Advanced Studies at the Hebrew University of Jerusalem in May 2011, as a Visiting Assistant Professor at the engineering graduate school of the Polytechnic University of Turin both in May 2007 and 2009, and in 2023, Piccinini was a Visiting Fellow at the Australian National University.

== Work ==
Piccinini specializes in theories of Computation, Neuroscience, Psychology and the human Mind. An overview of his most influential work in these areas is below.

Piccinini is known for his mechanistic account of computation. In his 2015 book Physical Computation: A Mechanistic Account, he argues that a mechanistic account of physical computation satisfies the six desiderata (objectivity, explanation, the right things compute, the wrong things don’t compute, miscomputation is explained, and taxonomy) better than competing accounts. He argues that computation is a kind of mechanistic process that does not require representation or information processing, but information processing does require computation.

Piccinini and co-author Sonya Bahar, a physicist and Director of the Center for Neurodynamics at University of Missouri, St. Louis, argue that neural computations are neither digital nor analog, but sui generis. In Piccinini's 2020 book Neurocognitive Mechanisms: Explaining Biological Cognition, he defends neural computational framework where he develops a multilevel mechanistic account of cognition grounded in cognitive neuroscience. In this book he also defends an egalitarian view of realization, a mechanistic form of functionalism, that cognition is computational, as well as further arguing that neural computations sui generis. Piccinini also argues that neuroscience should be integrated into cognitive science to complete the overall picture and understanding of the mind.

An edited volume he edited, Neurocognitive Foundations of Mind, provides evidence that cognitive neuroscience is developing into an interdisciplinary science by integrating computation, psychology, and neuroscience that is deepening our understanding of the mind. The chapters in the edited volume show how cognitive science integrated with neuroscience (cognitive neuroscience) produces a unified, integrated, multilevel, mechanistic, neurocomputational account of the mind.

Piccinini is also widely known for his critique of pancomputationalism and for his view about first-person data such as data from first-person reports. He has argued that first-person data are scientifically legitimate because they are public like other scientific data. Piccinini has also published influential articles on computational theories of cognition, concepts, and consciousness.

== Select recognition ==
Piccinini has received several grants, fellowships, and teaching releases, including two Scholars' Awards by the National Science Foundation. Piccinini has received several awards, including the 2026 Covey Award by the International Association for Computing and Philosophy, the 2019 Chancellor's Award for Research and Creativity from the University of Missouri–St. Louis, the 2018 K. Jon Barwise Prize from the American Philosophical Association, and the 2014 Herbert Simon award by the International Association of Computing and Philosophy.

He is the founder of Brains, an academic group blog in the philosophy of mind, psychology, and neuroscience. He administered the blog until 2012. He is one of the founders of SLAPSA, a St. Louis-based organization for the philosophy of science, run by Piccinini, Carl Craver (Washington University in St. Louis) and Kent Staley (Saint Louis University).

He is also a founder of ISPSM, a hub for connecting researchers around the globe in all areas of the philosophy of mind and related sciences, including but not limited to philosophy of psychology and philosophy of neuroscience.

Piccinini has done editorial work for multiple academic journals, including: Cognitive Science, Humanities, Journal of Cognitive Science, and The Rutherford Journal. He is also editor-in-chief of "Studies in Brain and Mind", a Springer book series. He has held this position since 2010.

== Bibliography ==
This is only a partial list of publications by Gualtiero Piccinini. A full list is viewable on the "Published Articles" section of his Curriculum Vitae, viewable here.

- Piccinini, Gualtiero, ed (2025). Neurocognitive Foundations of Mind (1st ed.). New York: Routledge. doi:10.4324/9781003458531 ISBN 978-1-003-45853-1.
- Piccinini, Gualtiero; Anderson, Neal G. (2024). The Physical Signature of Computation: A Robust Mapping Account. Oxford University Press. ISBN 978-0-19-883364-2.
- Piccinini, Gualtiero; Colombo, Matteo (2023). The Computational Theory of Mind. Cambridge University Press. doi:10.1017/9781009183734. ISBN 978-1-009-18373-4.
- Piccinini, Gualtiero (2020). Neurocognitive Mechanisms: Explaining Biological Cognition. Oxford University Press. doi:10.1093/oso/9780198866282.001.0001. ISBN 978-0-19-886628-2.
- Piccinini, Gualtiero (2015). Physical Computation: A Mechanistic Account. Oxford University Press. doi:10.1093/acprof:oso/9780199658855.001.0001. ISBN 978-0-19-965885-5.
- Piccinini, Gualtiero; Bahar, Sonya (5 November 2012). "Neural Computation and the Computational Theory of Cognition". Cognitive Science. 37 (3). Wiley: 453–488. doi:10.1111/cogs.12012. ISSN 0364-0213. PMID 23126542.
- Piccinini, Gualtiero; Craver, Carl (11 March 2011). "Integrating psychology and neuroscience: functional analyses as mechanism sketches". Synthese. 183 (3). Springer Science and Business Media LLC: 283–311. doi:10.1007/s11229-011-9898-4. ISSN 0039-7857. S2CID 6726609.
- “Information Processing, Computation, and Cognition” (with Andrea Scarantino). Journal of Biological Physics, 37.1 (2011), pp. 1–38.
- Piccinini, Gualtiero (2010). "The Mind as Neural Software? Understanding Functionalism, Computationalism, and Computational Functionalism" (PDF). Philosophy and Phenomenological Research. 81 (2). Wiley: 269–311. doi:10.1111/j.1933-1592.2010.00356.x. ISSN 0031-8205.
- “Computation in Physical Systems,” The Stanford Encyclopedia of Philosophy.(Fall 2010 Edition), Edward N. Zalta (ed.).
- “First-Person Data, Publicity, and Self-Measurement.” Philosophers’ Imprint, 9.9 (2009), pp. 1–16.
- Piccinini, Gualtiero (21 September 2006). "Computation without Representation". Philosophical Studies. 137 (2). Springer Science and Business Media LLC: 205–241. doi:10.1007/s11098-005-5385-4. ISSN 0031-8116. S2CID 17406419.
- Piccinini, Gualtiero (2007). "Computational modelling vs. Computational explanation: Is everything a Turing Machine, and does it matter to the philosophy of mind?1". Australasian Journal of Philosophy. 85 (1). Informa UK Limited: 93–115. doi:10.1080/00048400601176494. ISSN 0004-8402. S2CID 170303007.
- “A Unified Mechanistic Account of Teleological Functions for Psychology and Neuroscience” (with Corey J. Maley), in David Kaplan (ed.), Integrating Psychology and Neuroscience: Prospects and Problems, Oxford: Oxford University Press (forthcoming). 10,600 words.
- “The Computational Theory of Cognition,” in V. C. Müller (ed.), Fundamental Issues of Artificial Intelligence (Synthese Library), Berlin: Springer (forthcoming). 8,300 words.
- Boone, Worth; Piccinini, Gualtiero (10 June 2015). "The cognitive neuroscience revolution" (PDF). Synthese. 193 (5). Springer Science and Business Media LLC: 1509–1534. doi:10.1007/s11229-015-0783-4. ISSN 0039-7857. S2CID 10453762.
- ROBINSON, ZACK; MALEY, COREY J.; PICCININI, GUALTIERO (2015). "Is Consciousness a Spandrel?". Journal of the American Philosophical Association. 1 (2). Cambridge University Press (CUP): 365–383. doi:10.1017/apa.2014.10. ISSN 2053-4477. S2CID 170892645.

== Sources ==
- Frescos, Nir (15 July 2008). "An Analysis of the Criteria for Evaluating Adequate Theories of Computation." Minds and Machines. 18 (3). Springer Science and Business Media LLC: 379-401. doi:10.1007/s11023-008-9111-9. ISSN 0924-6495. S2CID 19633213.
- Arkoudas, Konstantine (2008). Computation, Hypercomputation, and Physical Science. Journal of Applied Logic. 6 (4). Elsevier BV: 461–475. doi:10.1016/j.jal.2008.09.007. ISSN 1570-8683.
- Chalmers, D., The Character of Consciousness, Oxford University Press (2010), p. 53.
- Shagrir, Oron (2022). "Review of Physical Computation: A Mechanistic Account by Gualtiero Piccicini." Cambridge. Accessed 8 November 2025.
- "Gualtiero Piccinini's Homepage". St. Louis: University of Missouri. 10 March 2010. Retrieved 31 December 2012.
- "Gualtiero Piccinini's Faculty Page." University of Missouri-Columbia. Retrieved 3 November 2025.https://philosophy.missouri.edu/people/piccinini.
- Piccinini, Gualtiero (2015). Physical Computation: A Mechanistic Account. Oxford Press. https://doi.org/10.1093/acprof:oso/9780199658855.001.0001. Accessed 3 November 2025.
- Piccinini, Gualtiero and Bahar, Sonya (2013). "Neural Computation and the Computational Theory of Mind." https://doi.org/10.1111/cogs.12012. Cognitive Science. Accessed 3 November 2025.
- Piccinini, Gualtiero (2020). Neurocognitive Mechanisms: Explaining Biological Cognition. Oxford University Press. https://doi.org/10.1093/oso/9780198866282.001.0001. Accessed 3 November 2025.
- Piccinini, Gualtiero and Craver, Carl (2011). "Integrating Psychology and Neuroscience: Functional Analyses as Mechanism Sketches." Synthese. https://doi.org/10.1007/s11229-011-9898-4. Accessed 3 November 2025.
- Piccinini, Gualtiero (2025). Neurocognitive Foundations of Mind. Routledge. https://doi.org/10.4324/9781003458531. Accessed 3 November 2025.
