= Machamer =

Machamer is a surname. Notable people with the surname include:

- Christina Machamer (born 1982), American chef
- Jefferson Machamer (1900–1960), American cartoonist and illustrator
- Peter K. Machamer (1942–2023), American philosopher and historian of science
