= Ambar Cristal Zarzuela =

- Born: San Juan de la Maguana, Dominican Republic
- Occupation: Model
- Modeling information
- Height: 1.77 m (5 ft 9 1/2 in)
- Hair color: Brown
- Eye color: Brown
- Agency: Next Management (worldwide)

Ambar Cristal Zarzuela is a Dominican fashion model. She has been on the cover of Vogue Mexico twice.

== Career ==
Zarzuela was chosen by casting director Ashley Brokaw to be a Louis Vuitton exclusive. She is also the first Dominican model to open a show for Vuitton. It was the first time she had ever left her hometown. That season she also walked for the likes of Christian Dior, Ralph Lauren, Chanel, Gabriela Hearst, Versace, Oscar de la Renta, Michael Kors, and Alberta Ferretti.

In 2019, Zarzuela appeared on the cover of Vogue Mexico with three other Afro-Dominican models, including Licett Morillo, and a year later appeared on the cover again. In 2020, a painted portrait of her appeared on the cover of Vogue Italia.
