= Devyn Garcia =

American plus-size fashion model (born 2001)

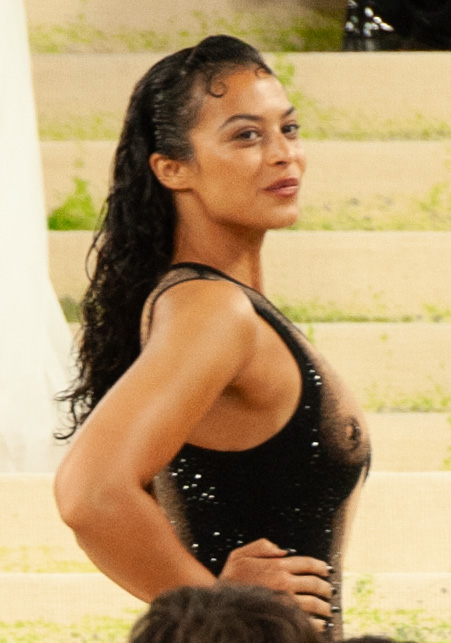
- Garcia at the 2026 Met Gala
- Born: Devyn Faith Garcia; July 24, 2001 (age 25); Miami Beach, Florida, U.S.
- Modeling information
- Hair color: Dark brown
- Eye color: Brown
- Agency: DNA Models (New York); Ford Models (Paris); Perspective Management (London); Priscilla's Model Management (Sydney)

Devyn Faith Garcia (born July 24, 2001) is an American fashion model. Born and raised in Miami Beach, Florida, she is the daughter of former model Jennie Pickens. Garcia began her career in late 2019, modeling consistently for Victoria's Secret as a plus-size model and becoming a brand ambassador in 2021. During the spring 2022 season, she walked for Gabriela Hearst, Brandon Maxwell, Altuzarra, Chloé, and Jacquemus, and Vogue named her one of the season's ten breakout models. She has appeared on the covers of i-D, T, Vogue México y Latinoamérica, Vogue España, Harper's Bazaar, Porter, and Vogue Germany. In 2024, she made her Victoria's Secret Fashion Show runway debut, and in 2026, she made her Met Gala debut wearing a custom Michael Kors gown. Garcia is on models.com's Top 50 list, and in 2025 she was included in the BoF 500 index of people shaping the fashion industry.

== Early life ==
Garcia was born and raised in Miami Beach, Florida. Her Cuban-American father, of Spanish descent via the Canary Islands, was a DJ, and her mother, Jennie Pickens, a former model, is of multiracial ancestry (black, white, and Native American). Pickens was signed to Ford Models after entering the agency's 1992 supermodel contest and worked as a model until about 2006; she later became a firefighter. Garcia has a younger sister.

== Career ==
Garcia, who was not interested in going to college, sent her pictures to agencies in her senior year of high school and signed with a New York agency, beginning her career in late 2019. She modeled consistently for Victoria's Secret as a plus-size model, becoming a brand ambassador in 2021. Her early campaign work included Gap and Nordstrom, and in 2024 she appeared alongside Vittoria Ceretti and Anok Yai in H&M's summer campaign, photographed by Rafael Pavarotti in Brazil. During the spring 2022 season, Garcia walked for Gabriela Hearst, Brandon Maxwell, Altuzarra, Chloé, and Jacquemus, and appeared in the AZ Factory tribute to Alber Elbaz that closed the season. Vogue named her one of the season's ten breakout models.

Garcia's first magazine cover was for i-D's Winter 2021 issue, photographed by Mario Sorrenti, and she covered the magazine again for its Summer 2023 issue. Her other covers include T (February 2022), Vogue México y Latinoamérica (April 2022), Vogue España (March 2023), Harper's Bazaar (May 2023), and Porter (July 2023). In 2024, she covered Harper's Bazaar France and the September issue of Vogue Germany; she covered Vogue Germany again in June 2026, sharing the cover with Yumi Nu, and appeared on one of the ten covers of V's Spring 2026 issue. Garcia has appeared in editorials for the Financial Times, Vogue, British Vogue, and W.

In October 2024, Garcia made her Victoria's Secret Fashion Show runway debut in Brooklyn, the brand's first show since 2018. In 2025, she walked in the Jacquemus show at the Palace of Versailles, and for Givenchy, Hermès, Fendi, Etro, Carolina Herrera, Willy Chavarria, Tory Burch, and Michael Kors.

She made her Met Gala debut in 2026, wearing a custom Michael Kors gown inspired by the "Costume Art" exhibition. Garcia is on models.com's Top 50 list and was nominated for its 2024 Model of the Year award, and in 2025 she was included in the BoF 500.
