= Peter K. Machamer =

American philosopher (1942–2023)

Peter K. Machamer (October 20, 1942 – May 31, 2023) was an American philosopher and historian of science. Machamer was Professor of History and Philosophy of Science at the University of Pittsburgh. His work has been influential in philosophy of science in developing an account of mechanistic explanation which rejects standard deductive models of explanation, such as the deductive-nomological model by understanding scientific practice as the search for mechanisms. His research has also focused on 17th-century history of philosophy and science, on Galileo Galilei and René Descartes in particular, and on values and science. He was also a wine columnist for the Pittsburgh Post-Gazette for fifteen years, and he has reflected on wine and beer in philosophical writing. Machamer was also the "Philosopher in Residence" for the Pittsburgh dance company Attack Theatre.

== Biography ==
Machamer earned his BA from Columbia University in 1964, his BA (1966) and MA (1971) from Trinity College, Cambridge University, and his PhD in philosophy from the University of Chicago in 1972. His dissertation, Points about Observation in Science, was supervised by Manley Thompson and Dudley Shapere. Machamer taught in the Department of Philosophy at Ohio State University from 1969 to 1976, receiving tenure, and then moved to the Department of History & Philosophy of Science at the University of Pittsburgh as associate professor in 1976, becoming professor in 1978. At the University of Pittsburgh, Machamer has served as chair (1978–1993) of History & Philosophy of Science, associate director of the Center for the Philosophy of Science (1999–20??), and as a member of the Center for Neural Basis of Cognition (CNBC). He has also been affiliated with the Cultural Studies Program at the University of Pittsburgh since its inception. He has been a Fulbright fellow at the University of Athens and the National Technical University of Athens (1996) and visiting professor at Universita' degli Studi di Udine (1994), the National Technical University of Athens (1998), Boğaziçi University (1998), and the University of Konstanz (2007). He has also received grants from the NEH, the NSF, the Heinz Foundation, the Mellon Foundation, and the U.S. Department of Education.

== Mechanisms and explanation ==
Machamer's work has been influential in developing an account of scientific explanation understood as the search for and filling in of mechanisms. His co-authored 2000 article (with Lindley Darden and Carl Craver) “Thinking about Mechanisms”, published in Philosophy of Science, has been cited over 3,000 times. His current work explores further consequences of this view in "Activities and Causation: The Metaphysics and Epistemology of Mechanisms," International Studies in the Philosophy of Science 187.1 (2004): 27–39, and in work in progress "Explaining Mechanisms" and "Models as Models of Mechanisms."

== History of philosophy and history and philosophy of science ==
Machamer's research in history of philosophy and history and philosophy of science has focused on Descartes and Galileo, but he has also worked on Hobbes and Aristotle. Much of his focus has been upon using natural philosophy by these figures as a way of understanding their metaphysics and epistemology.

== Student Supervision ==
Machamer supervised many PhD students working across a wide variety of different areas of history and philosophy of science during his time at Pitt. Many of these students have gone on to have very successful careers in the field including Carl F. Craver (Washington University in St. Louis), Heather Douglas (Michigan State University), and Gualtiero Piccinini (University of Missouri–St. Louis). Many of his former students contributed to an edited volume in his honour: Eppur Si Muove: Doing History and Philosophy of Science With Peter Machamer (Springer 2017).

== Selected works ==
=== Monographs ===
- Descartes' Changing Mind (Princeton University Press, 2009), with J.E. McGuire.

=== Selected edited books ===
- Perception, Realism, and Reference (Cambridge University Press, 2012), edited with A. Raftopoulos.
- Blackwell Guide to Philosophy of Science (Blackwell, 2002), edited with Michael Silberstein.
- Theory and Method in the Neurosciences (University of Pittsburgh Press, 2001), edited with P. McLaughlin and R. Grush.
- Scientific Controversies (Oxford, 2000), edited with A. Baltas and M. Pera.
- Cambridge Companion to Galileo (Cambridge University Press, 1998), editor.
- Mindscapes: Philosophy, Science and the Mind (UVK.Universitatsverlag Konstanz/University of Pittsburgh Press, 1997), edited with Martin Carrier.
- Perception: Historical and Philosophical Studies (Ohio State University Press, 1978), edited with Robert Turnbull.
- Motion and Time, Space, and Matter (Ohio State University Press, 1976), edited with Robert Turnbull.

=== Selected journal articles and other works ===
- "Thinking About Mechanisms," Philosophy of Science 67 (2000): 1-25, with Lindley Darden and Carl Craver. The most cited article in Philosophy of Science from 2011 to 2014.
- Entry on Galileo Galilei, The Stanford Encyclopedia of Philosophy.
- "Good Beer, or How Properly Dispute Taste" in Steven Hales, ed., Beer and Philosophy (Blackwell, 2007), 52–63.
