= Adriana E. Ramírez =

American writer

Ramírez at the 2026 Texas Book Festival

Adriana E. Ramírez is an American writer and critic of Mexican and Colombian descent. Her writing addresses the history and culture of violence in Colombia, Mexico, and the United States. From 2022-2026, she was also the editor of InReview, a member of the editorial board, and a columnist at the Pittsburgh Post-Gazette.

== Life ==
She graduated from Rice University in 2005, where she wrote for The Rice Thresher and was part of the poetry slam team. She received her MFA from the University of Pittsburgh, where she taught classes in creative writing and literature. She formerly taught nonfiction writing at Carlow University.

In 2015, she won the PEN/Fusion Emerging Writers Prize for Dead Boys. The manuscript was subsequently published as Dead Boys: A Memoir in 2016 by Little A, an imprint of Amazon Publishing. Her debut full-length work of nonfiction, The Violence, was acquired by Scribner and published in April 2026. In 2019, she received a grant of $10,000 from investing in professional artists, a joint project of the Pittsburgh Foundation and the Heinz Endowments; she also received that year's established artist Carol R. Brown Creative Achievement Award from the Pittsburgh Foundation. The grant describes The Violence as "a book on the history of violence in the Americas, from Pittsburgh to Colombia and back, blending family oral histories with larger national narratives."

In 2024, Ramírez won the Society for Features Journalism Division 2 award for Excellence-in-Features Journalism for General Commentary, for her column in the Pittsburgh Post-Gazette, and was a finalist for Arts & Culture Criticism.

She co-founded the literary journal Aster(ix) with Angie Cruz in 2013 and continues to serve as publisher. Beginning in 2016, she served as a critic-at-large for the Los Angeles Times. She competed on Jeopardy! in 2022, an experience she subsequently wrote about for The Atlantic.

== Works ==
- Dead Boys, Little A, 2016.
- The Swallows, Blue Sketch Press, 2016, ISBN 9781942547037
- The Violence, Scribner, 2026, ISBN 9781501145209
