= Licett Morillo =

Dominican fashion model

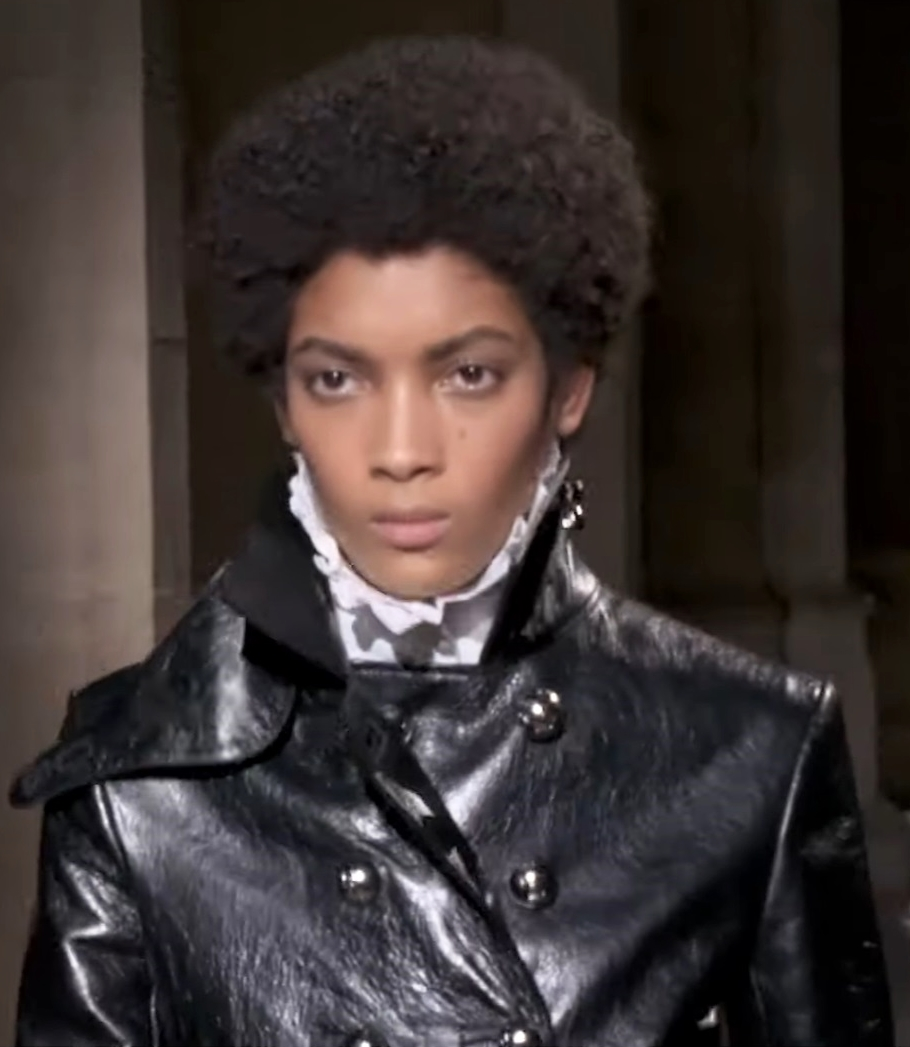
- Morillo in 2020
- Born: Licett Morillo Montero; 1996 or 1997 (age 28–29); Santo Domingo, Dominican Republic
- Occupation: Model
- Spouse: Ángel Feliz (m. 2021)
- Modeling information
- Height: 1.77 m (5 ft 9 1/2 in)
- Hair color: Brown
- Eye color: Brown
- Agency: IMG Models (worldwide); Nefer Models Management (Santo Domingo)

Licett Morillo Montero is a Dominican fashion model. Within months of being discovered by a modeling agency while on the way to school, she walked for Prada on the runway during Milan Fashion Week.

== Career ==
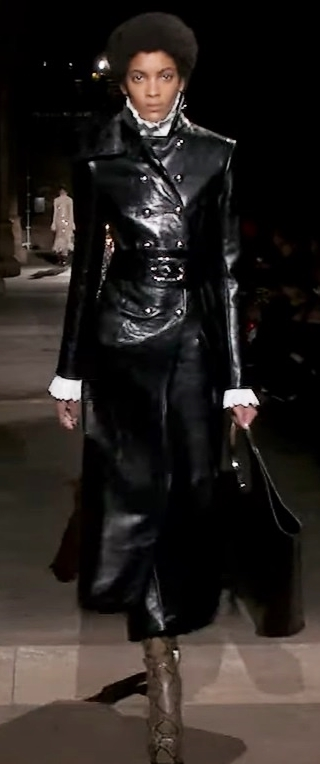
Morillo walks the runway at the Paco Rabanne Fall-Winter 2020-2021 show

Morillo was discovered in 2018 while on her way to school by Nileny Dippton, a modeling agency director. Morillo had been working at a plastics factory. Dippton sent her photos to IMG Models's associate director of scouting and upon signing her, they sent her to Milan for fashion week. The next month, she debuted as a Prada exclusive, chosen by Ashley Brokaw, opening and closing the show; the first model of color to do so. IMG signed her because senior vice president Jeni Rose felt she had a unique face. Rose described Morillo's Prada coup as akin to that of an actor winning an Oscar for a debut performance. In Paris, she walked the runway for brands like Celine, Saint Laurent, Valentino, Paco Rabanne, Chloé, and Hermès. She has also walked for Victoria Beckham, Dior, Lanvin, Missoni, Jil Sander, Versace, Max Mara, Alexander McQueen, Vera Wang, Carolina Herrera, Jason Wu, Michael Kors, Lacoste, Erdem, Ann Demeulemeester, Oscar de la Renta, and Rodarte.

In September 2019, Morillo was among the first Dominican models to appear on the cover of Vogue Mexico, alongside Ambar Cristal Zarzuela, Manuela Sánchez, and Annibelis Baez. She appeared solo on the magazine's January 2020 cover. She has also appeared on the cover of Dazed. She has appeared in editorials for British Vogue, Vogue España, Vogue Italia, Vogue Australia, CR Fashion Book, i-D Magazine, Self Service and Garage, as well as lookbooks for Coach New York and Barneys New York.
