= Tania Franco Klein =

Mexican photographer (b. 1990)

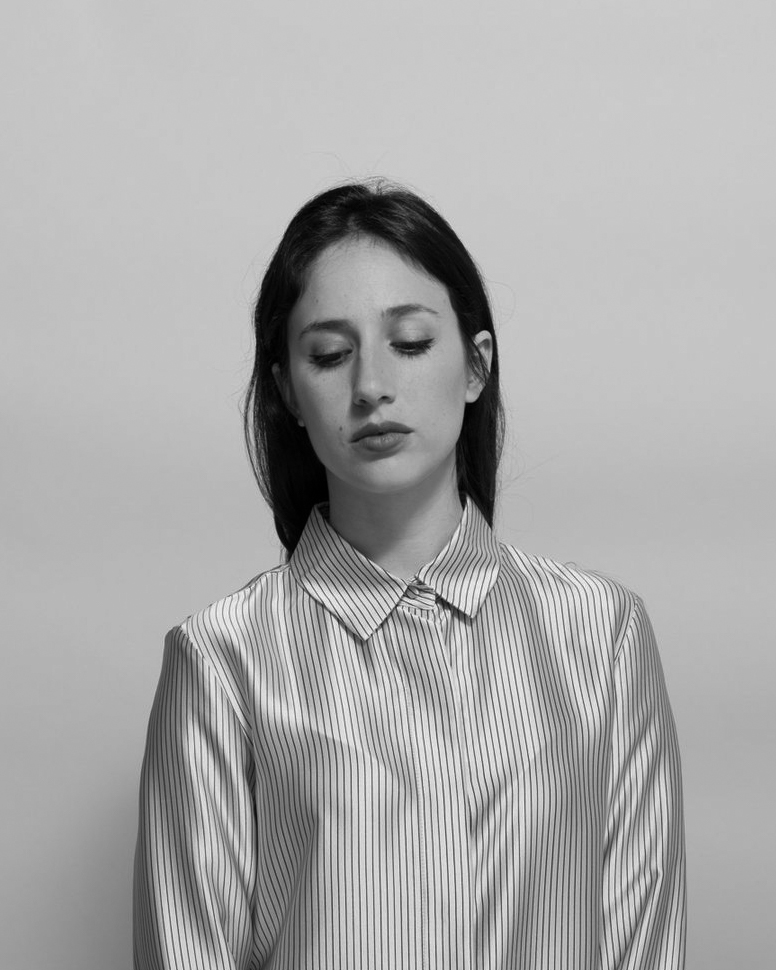
- Tania Franco Klein, 2024
- Born: 1990 (age 35–36); Mexico City, Mexico
- Education: Centro de Diseño, Cine y Televisión; University of the Arts London
- Known for: Photography
- Website: taniafrancoklein.com

Tania Franco Klein (born 1990) is a Mexican artist whose practice centers on photography.

Her work examines modern forms of isolation, performance, and emotional disconnection in an age of hyperconnectivity, often through cinematic self-portraiture staged in ambiguous domestic or roadside settings.

Her photographs are held in major public collections including the Museum of Modern Art (New York) and the J. Paul Getty Museum (Los Angeles).

== Early life and education ==
Franco Klein was born in Mexico City in 1990. She studied architecture at Centro de Diseño, Cine y Televisión in Mexico City (2009–2013), where she first experimented with photography. She later earned a master’s degree in photography from the University of the Arts London (2016). After graduating, she lived nomadically between Mexico and the United States, a period that shaped her preoccupation with transience, restlessness, and belonging.

== Life and work ==
After leaving London, Franco Klein began examining modern anxieties for the creation of her first long-term project, Our Life in the Shadows (2016–2018). The series depicts solitary women in domestic spaces—bathed in television glow or framed by mirrors—evoking what The Paris Review called “a mood of isolation, desperation, vanishing, and anxiety.” Drawing from Byung-Chul Han’s The Burnout Society and Kazimierz Dąbrowski’s theory of positive disintegration, she addressed exhaustion and overstimulation in late-capitalist culture. This body of work was published in 2019 by Éditions Bessard as Positive Disintegration.

In 2018, Franco Klein began Proceed to the Route, titled after a GPS command when users stray off course. The Guardian (2019) described the project’s origin in the California desert, where her GPS repeated “Proceed to the route,” which she took as a metaphor for society’s prescribed paths. The resulting photographs unfold in what anthropologist Marc Augé called “non-places”—motels, highways, and liminal spaces that speak to alienation and mobility. The work debuted at RoseGallery, Santa Monica, in 2019, where large-scale prints and wallpaper installations merged photographic and sculptural elements. Artforum listed the show among its Picks, and critic Annabel Osberg later named it one of Los Angeles’s top ten exhibitions of 2020.

In 2021, she collaborated with Time magazine to photograph survivors of the Andrés Roemer abuse case; one portrait was selected as one of Time’s Best Portraits of 2021. Her first New York solo exhibition, Long Story Short (2024), opened at Yancey Richardson Gallery. She was later featured in Looking Forward: Ten Years of Pier 24 Photography (2022–23). In 2025, she was included in New Photography 2025: Lines of Belonging at the Museum of Modern Art, marking the 40th anniversary of the series.

== Selected exhibitions ==
=== Solo exhibitions ===
- 2016 – Our Life in the Shadows, Centro de la Imagen, Mexico City
- 2018 – Our Life in the Shadows, Photo London, Somerset House, London
- 2019 – Proceed to the Route, RoseGallery, Santa Monica (Bergamot Station Arts Center)
- 2024 – Long Story Short, Yancey Richardson Gallery, New York City
- 2025 – RAGE™, Angstroms Gallery, Mexico City

=== Group exhibitions ===
- 2019 – Photo London – Discovery Section, Somerset House, London
- 2019 – Contemporary Photography from Latin America, MUAC, Mexico City
- 2020 – Women Photograph 2020, Aperture Foundation, New York
- 2020 – Next Level: Contemporary Photography, Foam Fotografiemuseum Amsterdam
- 2021 – Parasol Foundation Women in Photography, Victoria and Albert Museum, London
- 2021 – Contemporary Visions, Fotomuseum Winterthur, Switzerland
- 2022 – Looking Forward: Ten Years of Pier 24 Photography, Pier 24 Photography, San Francisco
- 2023 – Latin American Contemporary Photography, Colección Jumex, Mexico City
- 2025 – New Photography 2025: Lines of Belonging, Museum of Modern Art (MoMA), New York

== Publications ==
=== Books by Tania Franco Klein ===
- Positive Disintegration. By Tania Franco Klein. Paris: Éditions Bessard, 2019. ISBN 978-2-36582-096-1. Shortlisted for the 2019 Paris Photo–Aperture Foundation First Book Award.
- Mercado de Sonora. By Tania Franco Klein. Mexico City: Luhz Press, 2025. ISBN 978-607-99583-04-7.

=== Books and catalogs featuring her work ===
- Photo No-Nos: Meditations on What Not to Photograph. Edited by Jason Fulford. New York: Aperture, 2021. ISBN 978-1-59711-499-8.
- Face Time: A History of the Photographic Portrait. By Phillip Prodger. London / New York: Thames & Hudson, 2021. ISBN 978-0-500-54491-4.
- Her Dior: Maria Grazia Chiuri’s New Voice. New York: Rizzoli, 2021. ISBN 978-0-8478-7029-5.
- Queer Formalism: The Return. By William J. Simmons. Berlin: Floating Opera Press, 2022. ISBN 978-3-9823894-00-0.
- Looking Forward: Ten Years of Pier 24 Photography. San Francisco: Pier 24 Photography / Pilara Family Foundation, 2022.
- Photo Book Photo List. By Christopher McCall. San Francisco: Pier 24 Photography, 2023.

== Style and themes ==
Franco Klein combines architectural composition with cinematic lighting and performative gesture. W Magazine noted that she constructs sets, alters locations, and stages scenes that resemble film stills—an approach she describes as “creating tableaux.” Her subjects—often herself or solitary figures—inhabit liminal spaces between public and private, reality and performance. Musée Magazine and the Financial Times describe these environments as charged with “cinematic dread,” with the female figure becoming a vessel for contemporary anxiety. She has described photography as “democratic,” a medium that invites connection and empathy, hoping viewers leave her images “knowing they are not alone.”

== Selected public collections ==
- Museum of Modern Art (New York)
- J. Paul Getty Museum (Los Angeles)
- Museum of Fine Arts, Houston
- Colección Jumex (Mexico City)
- Foam Fotografiemuseum Amsterdam
- Victoria and Albert Museum (London)
- Colección Telefónica (Madrid)
- Fotomuseum Winterthur (Switzerland)
- Centro de la Imagen (Mexico City)
- Museo Universitario Arte Contemporáneo (MUAC, Mexico City)
- Colección Alserkal (Dubai)

== Recognition and awards ==
- Named one of “The 9 Young Photographers You Should Be Following in 2019” by W Magazine.
- Shortlisted for the 2019 Paris Photo–Aperture Foundation First Book Award.
- Included in Time magazine’s Best Portraits of 2021.
- Selected for New Photography 2025 at the Museum of Modern Art, New York.
