= Byung-Chul Han =

South Korean–born philosopher (born 1959)

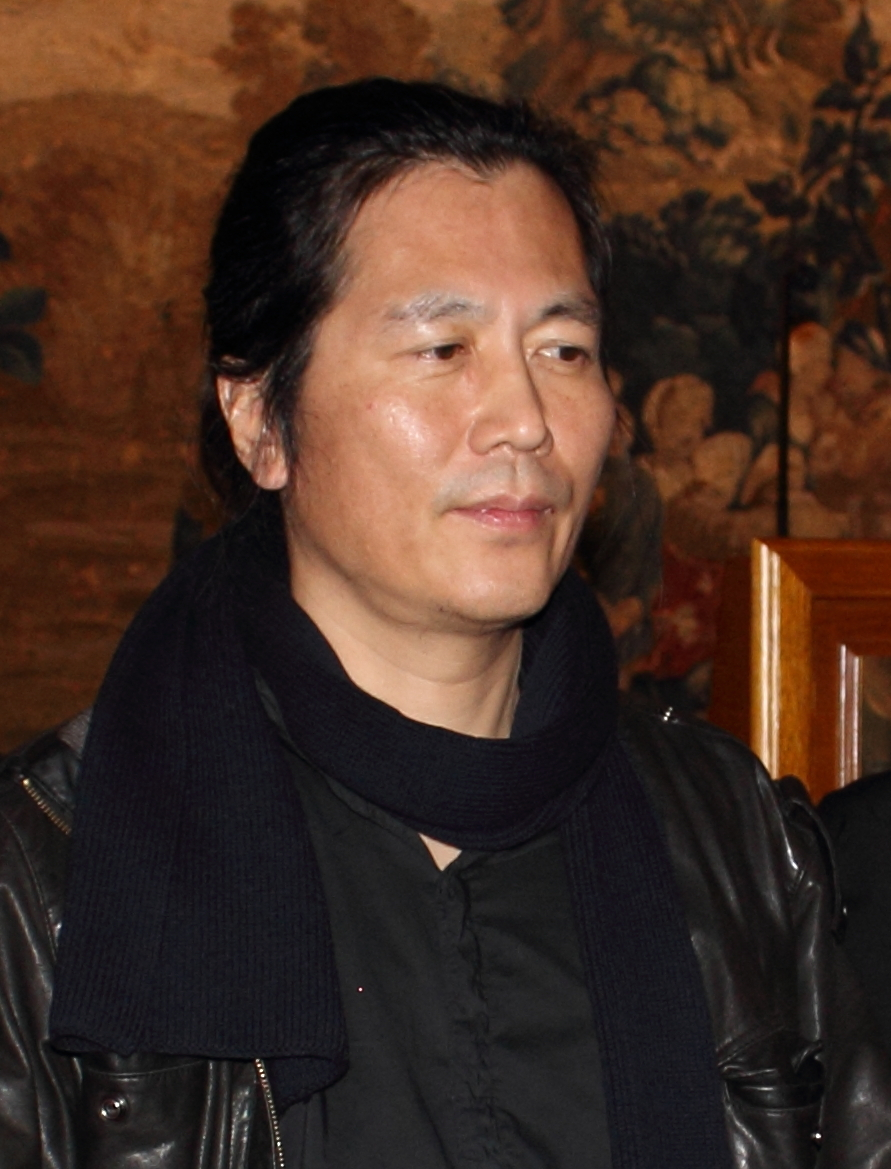
- Byung-Chul Han in 2015
- Born: 1959 (age 66–67); Seoul, South Korea

Education
- Education: University of Freiburg; University of Basel

Philosophical work
- Era: 20th-/21st-century philosophy
- Region: Western philosophy
- School: Continental philosophy, post-structuralism, deconstruction
- Main interests: Burnout; Depression; Internet; Love; Political theory; Power; Religion; Social media; Transparency; Violence
- Notable ideas: Shanzhai as "deconstruction in Chinese"; "infarcts"; "achievement-subjects"; positive and negative violence; agony of the Eros

Korean name
- Hangul: 한병철
- Hanja: 韓炳哲
- RR: Han Byeongcheol
- MR: Han Pyŏngch'ŏl
- IPA: /han pjʌŋt͡ɕʰʌl/

Byung-Chul Han (Korean: 한병철; born 1959) is a South Korean-born German philosopher, Catholic theologian and cultural theorist. He was a professor at the Berlin University of the Arts and still occasionally gives courses there. His work largely centers around critiques of neoliberalism and its impact on society and the individual. Although he writes in German, his books have been best received in the Hispanosphere.

== Biography ==
Byung-Chul Han studied metallurgy at Korea University in Seoul before moving to Germany in the 1980s to study philosophy, German literature and Catholic theology in Freiburg im Breisgau and Munich.

Han has said that he arrived in Germany at the age of 22, without knowing German or having read almost any philosophy.

At the end of my studies [in metallurgy], I felt like an idiot. I actually wanted to study something literary, but in Korea I couldn't change my studies, and my family wouldn't have allowed it. I had no choice but to leave. I lied to my parents and settled in Germany even though I could barely express myself in German. [...] I wanted to study German literature. I knew nothing about philosophy. I learned who Edmund Husserl and Martin Heidegger were when I arrived in Heidelberg. Being a romantic, I wanted to study literature, but I read too slowly, so I couldn't do it. I switched to philosophy. To study Hegel, speed is not important. It is enough to be able to read one page a day.

— Byung-Chul Han

In 1994, he received his doctoral degree at Freiburg with a dissertation on Stimmung, or mood, in Martin Heidegger.

In 2000, he joined the Department of Philosophy at the University of Basel, where he completed his habilitation. In 2010, he became a faculty member at the Karlsruhe University of Arts and Design, where his areas of interest were philosophy of the 18th, 19th and 20th centuries, ethics, social philosophy, phenomenology, cultural theory, aesthetics, religion, media theory, and intercultural philosophy. From 2012 to 2017 he taught philosophy and cultural studies at the Universität der Künste Berlin (UdK), where he directed the newly established Studium Generale general studies program.

Han is the author of more than thirty books, the most well known are treatises on what he terms a "society of tiredness" (Müdigkeitsgesellschaft) and a "society of transparency" (Transparenzgesellschaft). He also wrote about the concept of shanzhai (山寨), a style of imitative variation, which pre-exist practices known in Western philosophy as deconstructive.

Han's current work focuses on transparency as a cultural norm created by neoliberal market forces, which he understands as the insatiable drive toward voluntary disclosure bordering on the pornographic. According to Han, the dictates of transparency enforce a totalitarian system of openness at the expense of other social values such as shame, secrecy, and trust. To rebel against digital capitalism, Han does not own a smartphone, does not engage in tourism, only listens to music in analog form, and has spent years cultivating a "secret garden", an experience he describes in his book In Praise of the Earth.

== Personal life ==
Through his career, Han has refused to give radio and television interviews and rarely divulges any biographical or personal details, including his date of birth, in public. Although he did give a press conference prior to receiving the Princess of Asturias Award in 2025, he refused the typical press conference offered to a recipient each year. He accepted the press conference after some hesitation, but only answered questions related to his work. He is a Catholic.

== Thought ==
Han has written on topics such as attention deficit hyperactivity disorder, borderline personality disorder, burnout, depression, exhaustion, internet, love, multitasking, pop culture, power, rationality, religion, social media, subjectivity, tiredness, transparency and violence.

Much of Han's writing is characterised by an underlying concern with the situation encountered by human subjects in the fast-paced, technologically driven state of late capitalism. The situation is explored through several themes in his books: sexuality, mental health (particularly burnout, depression, and attention deficit hyperactivity disorder), violence, freedom, technology, and popular culture.

In The Burnout Society (original German title: Müdigkeitsgesellschaft), Han characterizes today's society as a pathological landscape of conditions such as depression, attention deficit hyperactivity disorder, borderline personality and burnout. He claims that they are not "infections" but "infarcts", which are not caused by the negativity of people's immunology, but by an excess of positivity. According to Han, driven by the demand to persevere and not to fail, as well as by ambitions of efficiency, we become committers and sacrificers at the same time and enter a swirl of demarcation, self-exploitation and collapse. In Psychopolitics, Han explains that "When production is immaterial, everyone already owns the means of production, him- or herself. The neoliberal system is no longer a class system in the proper sense. It does not consist of classes that display mutual antagonism. This is what accounts for the system's stability."

Han argues that subjects become self-exploiters: "Today, everyone is an auto-exploiting labourer in his or her own enterprise. People are now master and slave in one. Even class struggle has transformed into an inner struggle against oneself." The individual has become what Han calls "the achievement-subject"; the individual does not believe they are subjugated "subjects" but rather "projects: Always refashioning and reinventing ourselves" which "amounts to a form of compulsion and constraint—indeed, to a "more efficient kind of subjectivation and subjugation." As a project deeming itself free of external and alien limitations, the "I" subjugates itself to internal limitations and self-constraints, which are taking the form of compulsive achievement and optimization.

In Agonie des Eros ('Agony of the Eros') Han carries forward thoughts developed in his earlier books The Burnout Society (Müdigkeitsgesellschaft) and Transparency Society (Transparenzgesellschaft). Beginning with an analysis of the "Other" Han develops an interrogation of desire and love between human beings. Partly based on Lars von Trier's film Melancholia, where Han sees depression and overcoming depicted, Han further develops his thesis of a contemporary society that is increasingly dominated by narcissism and self-reference. Han's diagnosis extends even to the point of the loss of desire, the disappearance of the ability to devote to the "Other", the stranger, the non-self. At this point, subjects come to revolve exclusively around themselves, unable to build relationships. Even love and sexuality are permeated by this social change: sex and pornography, exhibition/voyeurism and re/presentation, are displacing love, eroticism, and desire from the public eye. The abundance of positivity and self-reference leads to a loss of confrontation. Thinking, Han states, is based on the "untreaded", on the desire for something that one does not yet understand. It is connected to a high degree with Eros, so the "agony of the Eros" is also an "agony of thought". Not everything must be understood and "liked", not everything must be made available.

In Topologie der Gewalt ('Topology of Violence'), Han continues his analysis of a society on the edge of collapse that he started with The Burnout Society. Focusing on the relation between violence and individuality, he shows that, against the widespread thesis about its disappearance, violence has only changed its form of appearance and now operates more subtly. The material form of violence gives way to a more anonymous, desubjectified, systemic one, that does not reveal itself, as it is merging with its antagonist – freedom. This theme is further explored in "Psychopolitics", where through Sigmund Freud, Walter Benjamin, Carl Schmitt, Richard Sennett, René Girard, Giorgio Agamben, Deleuze/Guattari, Michel Foucault, Michel Serres, Pierre Bourdieu and Martin Heidegger, Han develops an original conception of violence. Central to Han's thesis is the idea that violence finds expression in 'negative' and 'positive' forms (note: these are not normative judgements about the expressions themselves): negative violence is an overtly physical manifestation of violence, finding expression in war, torture, terrorism, etc.; positive violence "manifests itself as over-achievement, over-production, over-communication, hyper-attention, and hyperactivity." The violence of positivity, Han warns, could be even more disastrous than that of negativity. "Infection, invasion, and infiltration have given way to infarction."

== Reception ==
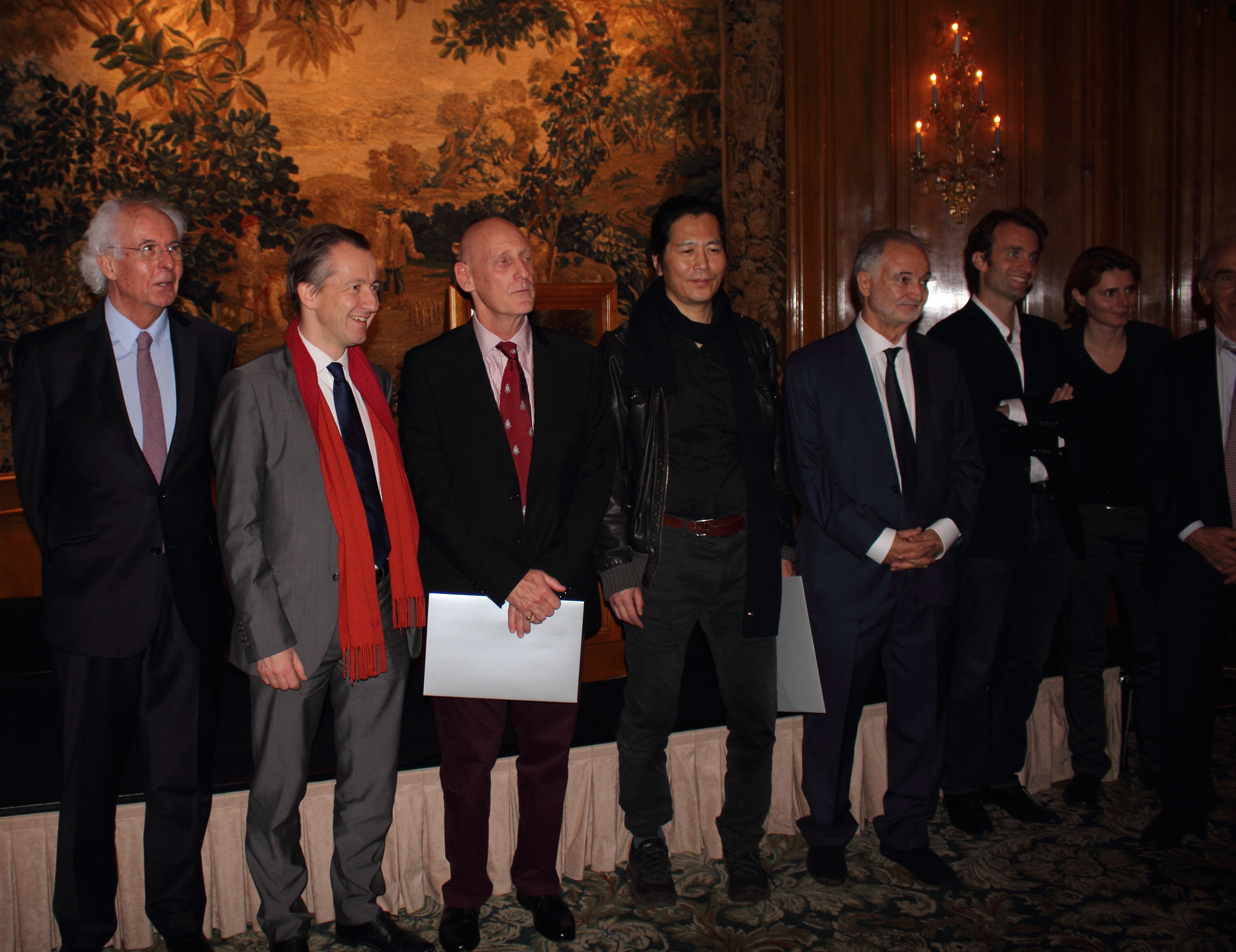
Han being awarded the Prix Bristol des Lumières alongside Jacques Attali, Christophe Barbier, Philippe-Joseph Salazar, among others

The Burnout Society has been translated into over 35 languages. Several South Korean newspapers voted it the most important book in 2012. It sold over a hundred thousand copies across Latin America, Korea, and Spain. The Los Angeles Review of Books described him as "as good a candidate as any for philosopher of the moment."

The Guardian wrote a positive review of his 2017 book Psychopolitics: Neoliberalism and New Technologies of Power, while the Hong Kong Review of Books praised his writing as "concise almost to the point of being aphoristic, Han's writing style manages to distill complex ideas into highly readable and persuasive prose" while noting that "on other occasions, Han veers uncomfortably close to billboard-sized statements ('Neoliberalism is the capitalism of Like'), which highlights the fine line between cleverness and self-indulgent sloganeering." Along similar lines, others observe that he writes with a style "more typical of [literature and poetry] than philosophical essays", though Han contends that "In the past, "I wrote differently. I wrote books that were very difficult to read, without thinking about whether they were understandable. But now, for me, [accessibility] is very important."

In 2025, Han was awarded the Princess of Asturias Awards for his writings on the ills of digital technology and contemporary capitalism.

== Works in English ==
- The Burnout Society (Stanford: Stanford University Press, 2015) ISBN 9780804795098.
- The Transparency Society (Stanford: Stanford Briefs, 2015) ISBN 080479460X
- The Agony of Eros (Cambridge, Massachusetts: MIT Press, 2017) ISBN 0262533375
- In the Swarm: Digital Prospects (Cambridge, Massachusetts: MIT Press, 2017), ISBN 0262533367
- Psychopolitics: Neoliberalism and New Technologies of Power (London & New York: Verso Books, 2017) ISBN 9781784785772
- Saving Beauty (Cambridge: Polity Press, 2017) ISBN 9781509515103
- The Scent of Time: A Philosophical Essay on the Art of Lingering (Cambridge: Polity Press, 2017) ISBN 1509516050
- Shanzhai: Deconstruction in Chinese (Cambridge, Massachusetts: MIT Press, 2017) ISBN 0262534363
- The Expulsion of the Other: Society, Perception and Communication Today (Cambridge: Polity Press, 2018) ISBN 1509523065
- Topology of Violence (Cambridge, Massachusetts: MIT Press, 2018) ISBN 9780262534956
- What Is Power? (Cambridge: Polity Press, 2018) ISBN 9781509516100
- Good Entertainment: A Deconstruction of the Western Passion Narrative (Cambridge, Mass.: MIT Press, 2019) ISBN 0262537508
- The Disappearance of Rituals: A Topology of the Present (Cambridge: Polity Press, 2020) ISBN 1509542760
- Capitalism and the Death Drive (Cambridge: Polity Press, 2021) ISBN 9781509545018
- The Palliative Society: Pain Today (Cambridge: Polity Press, 2021) ISBN 9781509547258
- Hyperculture: Culture and Globalisation (Cambridge: Polity Press, 2022) ISBN 9781509546183
- Infocracy: Digitization and the Crisis of Democracy (Cambridge: Polity Press, 2022) ISBN 9781509552986
- Non-things: Upheaval in the Lifeworld (Cambridge: Polity Press, 2022) ISBN 9781509551705
- The Philosophy of Zen Buddhism (Cambridge: Polity Press, 2022) ISBN 9781509545100
- Absence: On the Culture and Philosophy of the Far East (Cambridge: Polity Press, 2023) ISBN 9781509546206
- Vita contemplativa: In praise of inactivity (Cambridge: Polity Press, 2023) ISBN 9781509558018
- The Crisis of Narration (Cambridge: Polity Press, 2024) ISBN 9781509560431
- The Spirit of Hope (Cambridge: Polity Press, 2024) ISBN 9781509565191
- In Praise of the Earth: A Journey into the Garden (Cambridge: Polity Press, 2025) ISBN 9781509567898
- Speaking About God: A Dialogue with Simone Weil (Cambridge: Polity Press, 2026) ISBN 9781509574193

== Awards ==
- 2025: Princess of Asturias Award for Communication and Humanities.
