= Steven L. Small =

American neuroscientist

Steven L. Small is an American neuroscientist and physician who serves as the Ashbel Smith Professor of Neuroscience at the University of Texas at Dallas, a professor of neurology at the University of Texas Southwestern Medical Center, and professor emeritus of neurology and psychology at the University of Chicago. His research focuses on cognitive neuroscience, with an emphasis on the neuroscience of language.

== Biography ==
Small was born in Flushing, Queens, New York City. He earned his A.B. in mathematics from Dartmouth College in 1976 and his Ph.D. in computer science from the University of Maryland in 1980. He traveled as a Fulbright scholar at Paris 8 University to give lectures in artificial intelligence.

In 1981, he started as an assistant professor of computer science and psychology at the University of Rochester. In 1983, he enrolled at the University of Rochester School of Medicine and Dentistry, remaining an adjunct professor while earning his M.D.. After graduating, he moved to the University of Pittsburgh as an adjunct assistant professor of intelligent systems while completing a residency in neurology.

== Career ==
Small remained at the University of Pittsburgh for five years following completion of his residency in 1991 as assistant professor in three departments (Intelligent Systems, Psychology, and Communication Sciences and Disorders) as well as a member of the university's Center for Neuroscience and a founding member of its Center for Neural Basis of Cognition. He moved to the University of Maryland as associate professor in the departments of Neurology and Physiology in 1996, at which time he founded the university's MRI Research Program.

In 1999, Small moved to The University of Chicago as associate professor in the departments of Neurology and Psychology and became the co-founder and co-director of the Brain Imaging Research Center, becoming full professor in 2005. In 2007, he became Senior Fellow of the Computation Institute and in 2008, Vice Chair for Research in the Department of Neurology. Small left the University of Chicago in 2010 and retains professor emeritus status.

From 2010 to 2017, he was Professor and Chair of the Department of Neurology at the University of California, Irvine, while directing the university's Neuroscience Imaging Center (2012–2016). He retained holding appointments in the departments of Cognitive Sciences and Neurobiology and Behavior until 2019. In 2017, Small left his position as Chair of Neurology to found and develop the university's Medical Innovation Institute as its Chief Scientific Officer.

In spring 2019, Small was appointed dean of the School of Behavioral and Brain Sciences at the University of Texas at Dallas, a position he held through the 2023 academic year. He lives in Dallas, Texas, with his wife Ana Solodkin, who is Professor of Neuroscience at the same university.

== Academic work ==
Small's research specialization encompasses various fields including the neurobiology of language, neurobiology of sports, brain connectivity, computational neuroscience, aphasia, and brain recovery and repair after stroke and traumatic brain injury. Methods that he uses to investigate research questions include functional magnetic resonance imaging (fMRI), diffusion MRI, neural networks, machine learning, and human neurophysiology.

Small was a pioneer in using magnetic resonance imaging to understand how the brain gives rise to the complex phenomenon of thought, and has consistently been positioned at the forefront of the study of the neurobiology of language. His work emphasizes the importance of the implementation level of neuroscientist David Marr's information processing levels of analysis, reflecting his complementary training as a computer scientist and a neurologist.

Small's work has spanned the basic science of mechanisms of language understanding to the application of the science to new advances in therapy. His basic conceptual framework views language as a higher-level function superimposed across multiple systems over the phylogenetic history of the human species, including motor and attention systems. This work demonstrates that the "language network" is not a static entity, but dynamically assembles necessary brain mechanisms to meet the challenges of language processing. His collaborative research provides evidence for motor system contributions to basic mechanisms of face-to-face communication for the decoding of acoustic-phonetic information and gesture, which correspond to homuncular activation patterns on premotor cortex. While Small's work indicates that the motor system mediates perception and understanding of language, it also finds different functional anatomy for visually observing actions/objects compared to processing sentences describing actions/objects, providing evidence against the strongest version of the simulation theory for processing action-related language. Small's work also indicates that attention to space, time, or action in identical stories modulates activity in the left inferior frontal gyrus. Related work indicates that differential exogenous processing demands in discourse comprehension affect the nature of endogenous "resting state" networks dependent on the preceding task.

In addition to his contributions to understanding the healthy brain, Small investigates the connection between brain and behavior in post-stroke aphasia, early focal brain injury, and concussion.

== Honors ==
In 2014, he was an invited presenter for the Presidential Commission for the Study of Bioethical Issues. In 2018, he received the Society for the Neurobiology of Language's first Distinguished Career Award during the 10th annual meeting.

In 2009, along with Pascale Tremblay (Associate Professor of Rehabilitation, Université Laval), he organized the first international meeting on the Neurobiology of Language. The success of the conference led to continuing the conference on an annual basis and the founding of the Society for the Neurobiology of Language as a 501(c)(3) nonprofit charitable corporation in the State of Illinois.

Small was Editor in Chief of the international scholarly journal Brain and Language from 2005 to 2019. In 2019, he launched with co-editor in chief Kate Watkins (Professor of Cognitive Neuroscience, University of Oxford) the journal, Neurobiology of Language (MIT Press), sponsored by the MIT Press and the Society for the Neurobiology of Language.

He is a fellow of the American Academy of Neurology, the American Neurological Association, the American Association for the Advancement of Science, and a founder of the Society for Neurobiology of Language.

== Selected work ==
His published work has been cited over 16,000 times

- Harris, A. E., Ermentrout, G. B., & Small, S. L. (1997). A Model of Ocular Dominance Column Development by Competition for Trophic Factor. Proceedings of the National Academy of Sciences of the United States of America, 94(18), 9944-9949.
- Burton, M. W., Small, S. L., & Blumstein, S. E. (2000). The role of segmentation in phonological processing: an fMRI investigation. Journal of cognitive neuroscience, 12(4), 679–690.
- Small, S. L., Hlustik, P., Noll, D. C., Genovese, C., & Solodkin, A. (2002). Cerebellar hemispheric activation ipsilateral to the paretic hand correlates with functional recovery after stroke. Brain, 125(7), 1544–1557.
- Solodkin, A., Hlustik, P., Chen, E. E., & Small, S. L. (2004). Fine modulation in network activation during motor execution and motor imagery. Cerebral cortex, 14(11), 1246–1255.
- Skipper, J. I., Nusbaum, H. C., & Small, S. L. (2005). Listening to talking faces: motor cortical activation during speech perception. Neuroimage, 25(1), 76–89.
- Buccino, G., Solodkin, A., & Small, S. L. (2006). Functions of the mirror neuron system: implications for neurorehabilitation. Cognitive and behavioral neurology, 19(1), 55–63.
- Ertelt, D., Small, S. L., Solodkin, A., Dettmers, C., McNamara, A., Binkofski, F., & Buccino, G. (2007). Action observation has a positive impact on rehabilitation of motor deficits after stroke. Neuroimage, 36, T164-T173.
- Hasson, U., Skipper, J. I., Nusbaum, H. C., & Small, S. L. (2007). Abstract coding of audiovisual speech: beyond sensory representation. Neuron, 56(6), 1116-1126.
- Skipper, J. I., Van Wassenhove, V., Nusbaum, H. C., & Small, S. L. (2007). Hearing lips and seeing voices: how cortical areas supporting speech production mediate audiovisual speech perception. Cerebral Cortex, 17(10), 2387–2399.
- Milton, J., Solodkin, A., Hluštík, P., & Small, S. L. (2007). The mind of expert motor performance is cool and focused. Neuroimage, 35(2), 804–813.
- Beilock, S. L., Lyons, I. M., Mattarella-Micke, A., Nusbaum, H. C., & Small, S. L. (2008). Sports experience changes the neural processing of action language. Proceedings of the National Academy of Sciences of the United States of America, 105(36), 13269-13273.
- Hasson, U., Nusbaum, H. C., & Small, S. L. (2009). Task-dependent organization of brain regions active during rest. Proceedings of the National Academy of Sciences of the United States of America, 106(26), 10841-10846.
- Tremblay, P., Dick, A. S., & Small, S. L. (2013). Functional and structural aging of the speech sensorimotor neural system: functional magnetic resonance imaging evidence. Neurobiol Aging, 34(8), 1935-1951. https://doi.org/10.1016/j.neurobiolaging.2013.02.004
- Dick, A. S., Raja Beharelle, A., Solodkin, A., & Small, S. L. (2013). Interhemispheric functional connectivity following prenatal or perinatal brain injury predicts receptive language outcome. Journal of Neuroscience, 33(13), 5612-5625.
- Duncan, E. S., Schmah, T., & Small, S. L. (2016). Performance Variability as a Predictor of Response to Aphasia Treatment. Neurorehabilitation and neural repair, 30(9), 876-882.
- Asaridou, S. S., Demir-Lira Ö, E., Goldin-Meadow, S., Levine, S. C., & Small, S. L. (2020). Language development and brain reorganization in a child born without the left hemisphere. Cortex, 127, 290-312.
- Monroe, D. C., Thomas, E. A., Cecchi, N. J., Granger, D. A., Hicks, J. W., & Small, S. L. (2022). Salivary S100 calcium-binding protein beta (S100B) and neurofilament light (NfL) after acute exposure to repeated head impacts in collegiate water polo players. Scientific Reports, 12(1), 3439.

== Books ==
- Small, S. L., G. C. Cottrell, and M. K. Tanenhaus (eds.) (1988), Lexical Ambiguity Resolution: Perspectives from Psycholinguistics, Neuropsychology, and Artificial Intelligence, Morgan Kaufmann Publishers, Los Altos, California.
- The Chicago Social Brain Network (2010). Invisible Forces and Powerful Beliefs: Gravity, Gods, and Minds. Upper Saddle River, New Jersey: FT Press.
- Hickok, G., & Small, S. L. (Eds.). (2016). Neurobiology of Language (1st Edition). San Diego, California: Academic Press
