= David Roemer =

American photographer

David Roemer is an American fashion photographer known for his creative approach to photography.

== Early life and education ==
Roemer was born in New York City to an artist mother and father who worked as a professional photographer. He attended the School of Visual Arts, prior to this he studied psychology, film, and painting.

== Career ==
Roemer began his career as a photographer in 2003. In 2011, he won the Photo District News 30 Under 30 award.

He has worked for Amica, Elle Australia, Fashion, GQ México, GQ Russia, Harper's Bazaar Australia, Harper's Bazaar Russia, Harper's Bazaar UK, L'Officiel, L'Officiel USA, Madame Figaro, Marie Claire Australia, Marie Claire UK, Numéro Russia, Tatler, Vanity Fair Italia, Vogue Latinoamérica, Vogue México, VMan, Zoo, and more. Photographing models such as Adriana Lima, Constance Jablonski, Barbara Palvin, Irina Shayk, Eva Herzigová, Sara Sampaio, Alessandra Ambrosio, Behati Prinsloo, Mariacarla Boscono, and Joan Smalls.

He has shot campaigns for Anne Klein, Bebe, Bergdorf Goodman, Bloomingdale's, Bulgari, Cartier, Chanel, Donna Karan, Free People, H&M, Hervé Léger, Lancôme, Louis Vuitton, NARS, Neiman Marcus, Kevyn Aucoin, El Palacio de Hierro, Prabal Gurung, Saks Off 5th, and more.

== Personal life ==
Roemer lives in Los Angeles with his wife and two children.
