= Márcio-André =

Brazilian writer, director, performer, and poet (born 1978)

Márcio-André de Sousa Haz
- Born: Márcio-André de Sousa; March 2, 1978 (age 48); Rio de Janeiro, Brazil
- Other names: Márcio-André; M-A; Sousa Haz
- Occupations: Writer, film director, performer, sound poet, theorist
- Website: www.marcioandre.com

Márcio-André de Sousa Haz (born March 2, 1978, Rio de Janeiro) is a Spanish-Brazilian writer, film director, performer, sound poet and theorist. He signs his books and performs sound poetry under his first name Márcio-André and as a film director uses Sousa Haz.

== Biography ==
Márcio-André de Sousa Haz graduated in Literature and has a master's degree in Poetics from the Federal University of Rio de Janeiro. In 2008, he received a scholarship-prize from the Brazilian National Library Foundation and, in 2009, was poet-in-residence in Monsanto, Portugal. He taught an advanced training course in creative writing and sound poetry at University of Coimbra and literary theory at the Federal University of Rio de Janeiro.

In 2007, he appeared in newspaper headlines for his suicide performance in the ghost town of Chernobyl. In his lecture-of-one-man (that he called "Conference Poetic-Radioactive of Pripyat"), Marcio-Andre remained six hours reading his poems between the ruins of the ghost-town Pripyat (Chernobyl), in the so-called Zone of Exclusion, under the deliberate risk of contamination by cesium 137 and strontium 90. After the event, he received the nickname "poeta radioativo" (radioactive poet). This performance resulted in the book Ensaios Radioativos, where he describes the experience of contamination.

== Literature ==
Belonging to the so-called "Generation 00" of literature in Brazil, Marcio-Andre is an influential and relevant poet of the younger generation in Brazil and a controversial essayist. With three published books, he was chief-editor of the binational (Brazil / Portugal) Confraria Magazine (ISSN 1808-6276) and founder of Confraria do Vento. Eventually he began to write for Brazilian newspapers such as O Globo, Jornal do Brasil and Estado de Minas. As a translator, he has published texts of Gilles Yvain, Serge Pey, Gherasim Luca, Mathieu Bénézet, Paul Valéry and Hagiwara Sakutaro.

== Performance and sound poetry ==
Multimedia artist, Marcio-Andre has stood out with his research in the area of sound poetry. He held solo performances in several cities in the world, including Paris, London, Lima, Rotterdam, Buenos Aires, Lisbon and São Paulo. Between 2004 and 2007, led the group Arranjos para assobio (Arrangements for whistle) of poetic textures and experimental realities, linked with a sound research project at UFRJ, under academic advising by the philosopher Manuel Antonio de Castro. In 2009, he presented a performance with the American poet Bruce Andrews. In 2009, he has toured to Europe with his work Indivisible: polyphonic-poem for voices, violin, electronic processing, bells and whistles

In his performances, Marcio-Andre uses the computer to processing, live, harmonics sounds and percussive sounds taken from the violin and voice. From this processing, from the creation of electronic textures and from loop recordings, it overlaps sound layers and folds to create a uniform mass of texts and sounds. In his plays are noted influences from noisy music, minimalist music and Eastern music, especially by the use of Tibetan chants and modes of Noh theater. He uses, yet, abstract projections, videodances and video loops projected onto the stage and incorporates various other props in presentations.

== Main published works ==
- Intradoxos (Confraria do Vento, 2007)
- Ensaios Radioativos (Confraria do Vento, 2008)
- Poemas apócrifos de Paul Valéry (Confraria do Vento, 2014)
- Leonardo contra Paris (Confraria do Vento, 2016)

== Filmography ==
- Cidade Reposta (Short) Brazil, 2010
- Artaud en Compostela (Short) Spain, 2013
- The First Time I Saw Francis Taylor He Was in Slow Motion (Short) Hungary, 2016
- The concept of Irony (El concepto de ironía, Short) Spain/Hungary, 2017
- Man in the Crowd (Based on Edgar Allan Poe short story) Hungary, 2018
- Cosy for Two at Kuleshov St. (Short) Hungary, 2018
