= Lineisy Montero =

Dominican model (born 1996)

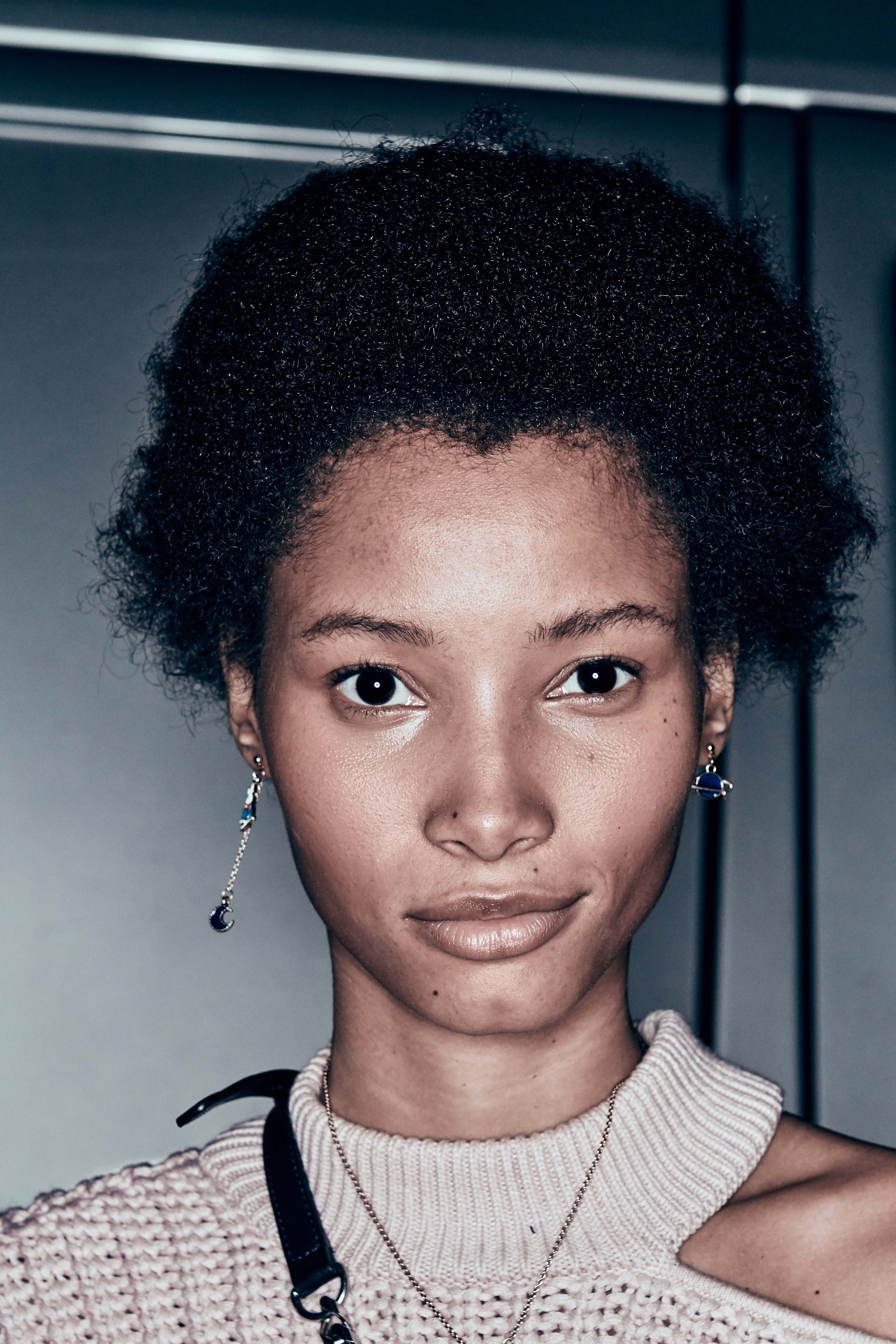
- Montero in 2019
- Born: Lineisy Montero Feliz; February 8, 1996 (age 30); Santo Domingo, Dominican Republic
- Occupation: Fashion model
- Years active: 2015–present
- Modeling information
- Height: 1.78 m (5 ft 10 in)
- Hair color: Brown
- Eye color: Brown
- Agency: Next Management (New York, Paris, Milan, London); Le Management (Copenhagen, Stockholm)

Lineisy Montero Feliz (born February 8, 1996) is a Dominican model best known for her work with Prada and her natural Afro hair. She currently ranks as one of the "Top 50" models in the fashion industry by models.com. including Balenciaga, Marc Jacobs, Oscar de la Renta, Roberto Cavalli, Versace and Céline.

== Career ==
Lineisy Montero is represented locally and internationally by Next Models and her parent agency, Ossygeno Models Mgt.

In 2015, Montero debuted as a Prada exclusive. The same year, she was on the cover of Teen Vogue. In 2016, she appeared in advertisements for Chanel, Givenchy, and H&M Beauty. She has done 18 editorials in American Vogue since 2016.

On the runway, Montero has walked in shows for high fashion brands including Elie Saab, Valentino, Kenzo, Nina Ricci, Loewe, Isabel Marant, Balmain, Chloé, Dolce & Gabbana, Marni, Diesel Black Gold, Max Mara, Burberry, Mulberry, Mary Katrantzou, Versus (Versace), Michael Kors, Vera Wang, rag & bone, Proenza Schouler, Tommy Hilfiger, Tom Ford, Dior, Louis Vuitton, Stella McCartney, Sonia Rykiel, Giambattista Valli, Mugler, Lanvin, Missoni, Salvatore Ferragamo, Jil Sander, Fendi, Ralph Lauren, Tory Burch, and Lacoste.
