= Camila Falquez =

Photographer

- Born: March 28, 1989 (age 37); Mexico City, Mexico
- Known for: Photography

Camila Falquez (born March 28, 1989, Mexico City) is a portrait photographer.

== Biography ==
Falquez was born in Mexico City and raised in Barcelona, Spain, by immigrant Colombian parents. She later emigrated to New York, United States, at the age of 21, and has since been based in Bushwick, Brooklyn. Falquez grew up in her mother's art studio and traveled with her to major European museums.

== Work ==
Falquez’s photography showcase the power and beauty within marginalized communities and BIPOC bodies. Falquez’s work further extends to photographing subjects from a range of gender and sexual identities.

Camila Falquez's artwork was acquired by the Pérez Art Museum Miami, Florida, in 2023. In 2025, her photograph is featured in Narratives in Focus: Selections from PAMM's Collection at the Miami institution, which includes artworks from a myriad of artists hailing from the Caribbean, Latin America, Africa, and the United States, present in the museum collection.

== Notable works ==
- In 2022, Camila Falquez photographed Zendaya for TIME, in the TIME100: The Most Influential People of 2022.
- In 2021, Falquez photographed Anya Taylor-Joy for the cover of Vogue México y Latinoamérica and Vogue España, both for their October issue.
- In 2020, she photographed US President Joe Biden and Vice President Kamala Harris.
- Falquez's works have been published in a number of established publications, such as The New York Times, The Guardian, TIME Magazine, The Wall Street Journal, Vogue, and El País, among others.
- Falquez is also known for Being In History and Gods That Walk Among Us. These works were created to display the beauty within marginalized communities.
