= Journal of Biological Physics =

Peer-reviewed scientific journal

- Discipline: Biophysics
- Language: English
- Edited by: Sonya Bahar

Publication details
- History: 1973—present
- Publisher: Springer
- Frequency: Quarterly
- Impact factor: 2.2 (2024)

Standard abbreviations
- ISO 4: J. Biol. Phys.

Indexing
- CODEN: JBPHBZ
- ISSN: 0092-0606 (print); 1573-0689 (web)

Links
- Journal homepage; Online access; Online archive

Journal of Biological Physics is a peer-reviewed scientific journal published quarterly by Springer Science+Business Media. Established in 1973, it covers developments in biophysics, including molecular biophysics and population dynamics of living organisms. Its current editor-in-chief is Sonya Bahar (University of Missouri–St. Louis).

== Abstracting and indexing ==
The journal is abstracted and indexed in:

- Biological Abstracts
- BIOSIS Previews
- EBSCO
- Embase
- Inspec
- ProQuest databases
- Science Citation Index Expanded
- Scopus

According to the Journal Citation Reports, the journal has a 2024 impact factor of 2.2.
