= The Burnout Society =

2010 book by Byung-Chul Han

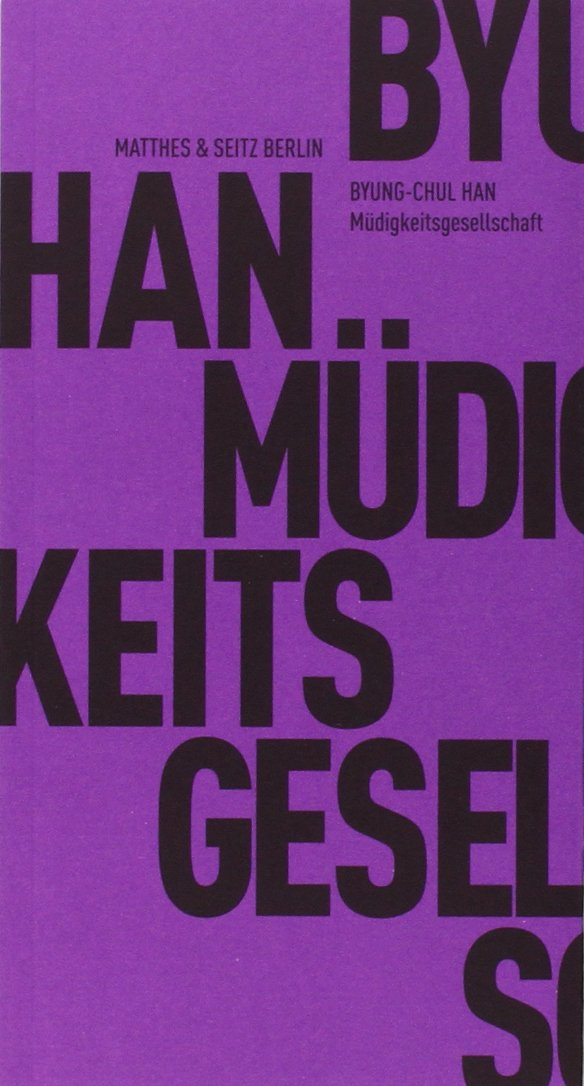
- Author: Byung-Chul Han
- Original title: Müdigkeitsgesellschaft
- Translator: Erik Butler
- Language: German
- Publisher: Matthes & Seitz Berlin (original); Stanford University Press (English)
- Publication date: 4 October 2010 (German); August 2015 (English)
- Pages: 72

The Burnout Society (original German title: Müdigkeitsgesellschaft) is a short philosophical book by the South Korean–German philosopher Byung-Chul Han. It was first released in German in 2010. It has since been translated into more than 35 languages, including an English translation by Erik Butler published in 2015 under the Stanford Briefs imprint.

Covering philosophy, literature and social theory, The Burnout Society is one of Han’s most popular books.
