= Njaimeh Njie =

American artist

- Born: 1988 (age 37–38); Pittsburgh, Pennsylvania
- Education: Washington University in St. Louis, Missouri
- Website: www.njaimehnjie.com

Njaimeh Njie (born 1988, Pittsburgh, Pennsylvania) is an American photographer, collagist, filmmaker, and installation artist documenting Black experiences through community-centered, archival, and oral history projects.

== Early life and education ==
Njaimeh Njie was born and raised in Pittsburgh, Pennsylvania, where she lives and works.

She earned a Bachelor of Arts in film and media studies (2010) from Washington University in St. Louis, Missouri, and a Master of Education in secondary education from the University of Missouri–St. Louis.

== Work ==
Njaimeh Njie's TED Talk "Recording Our History Matters" was delivered at TEDxPittsburghWomen in December 2019. She was an artist-in-residence at the Frank-Ratchye STUDIO for Creative Inquiry at Carnegie Mellon University, and a scholar-in-residence (spring 2020) at the Chatham University Women's Institute. Her publication This Is Where We Find Ourselves (2021), an archival project documenting the impacts of COVID-19 and historical inequities on Pittsburgh's area neighborhoods, was commissioned by the Heinz Foundations. Njie joined Fountainhead, Miami, artist-in-residence's cohort in August 2021.

Njie was a visual editor at Belt Magazine. She has contributed to the photography journal Fraction Magazine about her bodies of work: City on a Hill, in which she produced a series of public art murals around Hill District, a historic neighborhood in Pittsburgh, and This Is Where We Find Ourselves, respectively.

The video installation Did you get everything?, was presented at Mattress Factory, in 2021, part of the group show making home here alongside fellow artists Naomi Chambers, Gavin Andrew Benjamin, Justin Emmanuel Dumas, and Harrison Kinnane Smith. The exhibition combined collage, material culture, sound, and video installation to narrate everyday stories of Black Americans in Pittsburgh and Western Pennsylvania.

Njie filmed and edited Across the Walls, a documentary film depicting the life stories of women impacted by the justice system for decades long after receiving a sentence with no parole in the state of Pennsylvania. The 22-minute piece gathered sound recordings, archival and contemporary footage, as well as interviews with Avis Lee and Paulette Carrington, two advocates previously incarcerated for forty years. The film was commissioned by the 58th Carnegie International (2022), a contemporary art triennial organized by the Carnegie Museum of Art in Pittsburgh.

In 2023, she presented the solo exhibition Flight Plans at Carlow University Art Gallery, Pittsburgh. Through photo montage, installation, sound components, and language, the show revolved around Black liberation and Afrofuturism aesthetics and culture. Artworks in the gallery paid homage to jazz musicians Maxine Sullivan, writers Toni Morrison and Virginia Hamilton, as well as visual art Alisha Wormsley, among others.

=== Collections ===
Njaimeh Njie's photographic work is featured in the collections of the Pérez Art Museum Miami, Florida and the Carnegie Museum of Art, Pittsburgh, Pennsylvania.

=== Awards ===
Njie was awarded the 2019 Artist of the Year by the Pittsburgh City Paper and the Pittsburgh Center for the Arts 2018 Emerging Artist of the Year.
