= Virginie van Wassenhove =

French cognitive neuroscientist

- Education: University of Maryland, College Park
- Scientific career
- Thesis: Cortical dynamics of auditory-visual speech : a forward model of multisensory integration (2004)

Virginie van Wassenhove is a French cognitive neuroscientist known for her work on how our brains perceive time and the integration of information across senses. She is the director of research at the French Alternative Energies and Atomic Energy Commission and a team leader at INSERM's Neural Imaging Unit.

== Education and career ==
van Wassenhove received her Ph.D. at the University of Maryland, College Park's Neurosciences and Cognitive Sciences program in 2004. During her graduate school research, she worked on audiovisual speech processing. Following her PhD, she spent some time as a researcher at the University of California, San Francisco working on auditory learning and plasticity. In 2008 she moved to France where she joined the Neurospin as well as the Cognitive Neuroimaging Unit so that she could build and head the Neurospin MEG lab. By 2012, she had become an INSERM group leader and by 2013, she was director of research at the French Alternative Energies and Atomic Energy Commission. As of 2026 she works at the Frederic Joliot Institute for Life Sciences in the area of cognition and dynamics.

== Research ==
van Wassenhove's research examines how the brain uses different sensory modalities to examine the world. She has shown that people's ability to process sound is more efficient when their eyes are open. In a 2007 paper for the Neuropsychologia, she demonstrated the existence of an asymmetric, 200 millisecond integration window for auditory and visual signals from speech through 2 experiments with 43 participants. She has also worked on how our subjective perception of time is influenced by our senses and other factors.

== Honors and awards ==
She was awarded the ERC Synergy Grant for her project, "Cronology".

== Selected publications ==
- van Wassenhove, Virginie; Grant, Ken W.; Poeppel, David (2005-01-25). "Visual speech speeds up the neural processing of auditory speech". Proceedings of the National Academy of Sciences. 102 (4): 1181–1186. doi:10.1073/pnas.0408949102. ISSN 0027-8424. PMC 545853. PMID 15647358.
- van Wassenhove, Virginie; Grant, Ken W.; Poeppel, David (2007). "Temporal window of integration in auditory-visual speech perception". Neuropsychologia. 45 (3): 598–607. doi:10.1016/j.neuropsychologia.2006.01.001.
- van Wassenhove, Virginie; Buonomano, Dean V.; Shimojo, Shinsuke; Shams, Ladan (2008-01-16). "Distortions of Subjective Time Perception Within and Across Senses". PLoS ONE. 3 (1) e1437. doi:10.1371/journal.pone.0001437. ISSN 1932-6203. PMC 2174530. PMID 18197248.
- van Wassenhove, Virginie (2009-07-12). "Minding time in an amodal representational space". Philosophical Transactions of the Royal Society B: Biological Sciences. 364 (1525): 1815–1830. doi:10.1098/rstb.2009.0023. ISSN 0962-8436. PMC 2685822. PMID 19487185.
