= Carmen Campuzano =

Mexican actress and model

- Born: María del Carmen Campuzano; December 7, 1970 (age 54)
- Occupation(s): Actress, fashion model, DJ
- Years active: 1993–present

Carmen Campuzano (Spanish pronunciation: [ˈkaɾmeŋ kamˈpusano]; born December 7, 1970, as María del Carmen Campuzano) is a Mexican actress and fashion model.

Campuzano has been featured on the cover of Vogue magazine three times and won several modeling awards.

In 2005, Campuzano was the subject of an episode of the Mexican anthology series, Mujer, Casos de la Vida Real. The episode, reportedly approved by Campuzano herself, dealt with the actress' medical crises, which ranged from a bout with meningitis alleged to have been brought on by an ex-cook poisoning her food with human feces; an automobile accident which worsened her addiction to prescription drugs and cocaine, and finally, her involuntary commitment to a psychiatric hospital where she alleged that she was physically mistreated. In the episode, Campuzano was played by Spanish actress Frances Ondiviela.

== Awards ==
- Supermodel of the World (Mexico) in 1993
- Silver Star 1995
