= Jean-Francois Campos =

French photographer

- Born: Aix-en-Provence, France
- Occupations: Photographer and director
- Notable credit: Prix HSBC pour la photographie
- Website: http://www.jeanfrancoiscampos.com

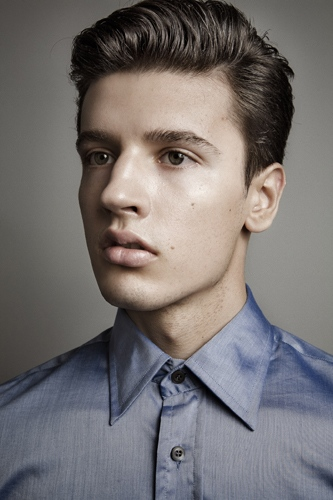
Jean-Francois Campos

Jean-Francois Campos (born in Aix-en-Provence, France) is a French photographer. His work has been exhibited internationally in numerous galleries and museums, such as the International Center of Photography in New York as well as the Centre national de la photographie in Paris. After an esteemed career as an Agence Vu photojournalist, beginning in Berlin during the fall of the Berlin Wall, and a long term collaboration with the French daily newspaper Libération, Jean-Francois Campos turned to fashion and portrait photography in 2006. Jean-Francois has since created numerous award-winning campaigns for clients such as Dior, Louis Vuitton, Shiseido, Celine, Van Cleef & Arpels, and LVMH; and has directed commercials for the likes of Secours Populaire, Mobalpa, and Links of London. Jean-François has collaborated to many international publications such as ELLE Magazine, Town & Country Magazine, Le Monde, and V Magazine.

== Awards ==
- 2014 Winner of American Photography 30 in the Editorial Portraiture category for portrait of Mary Ann Schoettly, an ordained priest
- 2012: Corporate Award at 27th Grand Prix de la Publicité Presse Magazine for LVMH; "Les Journées Particulières"
- 2004: 1st Prize Club des AD for Sony PlayStation campaign
- 1997: HSBC Foundation for Photography winner
- 1997: Nominated for the AFP award
- 1997: Laureate World Press Photo Masterclass
- 1996: Prix Moins Trente from the fr:Centre National de la Photographie
- 1991: Laureate of the Biennale des Jeunes Createurs de l’Europe de la Mediterranee
- 1990: Laureate of the Fondation Angenieux

== Exhibitions ==
- 2009: Sara, just Sara : in the mirror of my myths – Milk Gallery, New York
- 2006: Comment ça va avec l’amour – Maison de la Villette, Paris
- 2001: Le Collectif HSBC – Paris Photo, Paris
- 1999: Le Collectif Vu - Paris
- 1990: Berlin, à Coeur Ouvert – FNAC Galeries in Marseille, Bordeaux, Strasbourg, Paris, Berlin
- 1998: The French President - Mois de la Photo, Moscow
- 1997: Après la Pluie – Galerie Beaudoin Lebon, Paris
- 1997: Neighbours – Netherlands Institute for Photography, Rotterdam
- 1996: New Photography from France - International Center of Photography, New York
- 1996: Politique et Société – Centre National de la Photographie, Paris
- 1995: La Solitude du Candidat Chirac – Festival Visa pour l’Image, Perpignan
- 1991: Souvenirs de Berlin – Nuit de la photo, Musée de l'Élysée, Lausanne
- 1991: Fragments - Musée de la Vieille Charité, Marseille

== Monographs ==
Campos' first monograph Après la Pluie (Actes Sud Editions) was published in 1997 as a retrospection of his work in the French newspaper Libération with a preface by Jean Rouaud. Following this, Campos published Je ne vois pas ce qu’on me trouve (Actes Sud Collection Cinéma et Photographie, 1997) - a collection of images shot during the backstage moments of Christian Vincent's film which bears the same title, postface by Christian Caujolle.

== Publications ==
- Unbalanced (Self-published, 2014)
- Sara, just Sara (Miedzy Nami Cafe, Issue #28, 2009)
- Photographies Contemporaines (Textuel, 2006)
- Je ne vois pas ce qu'on me trouve (Actes Sud Collection Cinema et Photographie, 1997)
- Apres la Pluie (Actes Sud Monographie, 1997)
