= Russell James =

Australian photographer

Russell James (born 1962 in Perth, Western Australia) is a fashion, celebrity and beauty photographer.

== Early life ==
Russell James' name at birth was Russell Thomter. He was born in Western Australia and the family lived in country areas and in Perth. He has two sisters and his father was in the police force and became a detective. After dropping out of school at age 14, Russell got his first job working in a factory that made trashcans. After working in the factory, Russell held several odd jobs to make ends met before becoming a police officer. He was in a unit which protected eminent people. He was charged with guarding the then Prime Minister Mr Bob Hawke. During his time in the police force he dated a model who suggested he try out as a model. He has Scandinavian features inherited from his Norwegian grandfather. He was a successful model and worked in Perth and then Japan and Sweden. Russell arrived in the United States in 1989.

== Career ==
Russell James is most famous for his work as the main photographer for Victoria's Secret, but his work has appeared in a large range of magazines, including Vogue, Sports Illustrated, W, Marie Claire, and GQ. James has worked with many celebrities and fashion models, such as Alessandra Ambrósio, Tyra Banks, Kendall Jenner, Gisele Bündchen, Naomi Campbell, Karolína Kurková, Adriana Lima, Michelle Alves, Marisa Miller, Ana Beatriz Barros, Heidi Klum, Angela Lindvall, Fernanda Motta, Oluchi Onweagba, Miranda Kerr, Behati Prinsloo, and Erin Wasson.

Russell James has appeared several times in America's Next Top Model, Australia's Next Top Model, and Germany's Next Topmodel, as a guest photographer or judge.

Russell James was one of the twelve Hasselblad Masters Award recipients in 2007.

James also directs art films, music videos, and television commercials for Victoria's Secret and Gillette.

== Books ==
- Ellen von Unwerth, Raphael Mazzucco, Russell James (photographers): "Sexy" : A Tribute to a Decade of Sexy Swimwear, Victoria's Secret, 2005 (3 volumes).
