= Carl F. Craver =

American philosopher

- Awards: NSF Grant, Templeton Award

Education
- Education: University of Pittsburgh (BA, MA, PhD)
- Thesis: Neural Mechanisms: On the Structure, Function, and Development of Theories in Neurobiology (1998)
- Doctoral advisor: Peter K. Machamer
- Other advisors: Robert Olby, Wesley C. Salmon, Kenneth F. Schaffner, Steven Small

Philosophical work
- Era: 21st-century philosophy
- Region: Western philosophy
- Institutions: Washington University in St. Louis
- Main interests: philosophy of science, philosophy of mind, history of neuroscience, cognitive neuropsychology

Carl F. Craver is an American philosopher and Professor of Philosophy and Philosophy-Neuroscience-Psychology at Washington University in St. Louis. He is known for his works on philosophy of science and philosophy of mind.

== Books ==
- Craver, C.F. and Darden L. (2013) In Search of Mechanisms: Discoveries Across the Life Sciences. University of Chicago Press: Chicago.
- Craver, C.F. (2007) Explaining the Brain: Mechanisms and the Mosaic Unity of Neuroscience. Clarendon Press
