= Heinz Foundations =

American charitable foundations

The Heinz Foundations are several charitable foundations founded by members of the Pittsburgh-based Heinz Foods dynasty.

The Heinz Family Philanthropies are based in Pittsburgh and Washington, D.C., and include:

- The Teresa and H. John Heinz III Foundation
- The H. John Heinz III Foundation
- The Heinz Family Foundation

The Heinz Endowments are based in Pittsburgh and include:

- Howard Heinz Endowment
- Vira I. Heinz Endowment
