= Vogue México y Latinoamérica =

Mexican and Latin American fashion magazines

- Cover of the September 2015 issue of Vogue México, Joan Smalls by Russell James
- Head of Editorial Content: Atenea Morales de la Cruz
- Categories: Fashion
- Frequency: Monthly
- Publisher: Condé Nast
- Total circulation: 3.79 million
- First issue: October 1999
- Based in: Mexico City, Mexico (Vogue México); Miami, U.S. (Vogue Latinoamérica)
- Language: Spanish
- Website: vogue.mx

Vogue México y Latinoamérica (stylised in all caps) is a Mexican and Latin American monthly fashion magazine that covers ready-to-wear fashion, haute couture, popular culture, beauty, and lifestyle. Vogue México was published by Carta Editorial from 1980 to 1995 under license and from 1999 Vogue México and Vogue Latinoamérica are published by Condé Nast de México. Since 2026, Atenea Morales de la Cruz has served as head of editorial content.

Based in the Lomas de Chapultepec neighbourhood of Mexico City. Vogue México began publication in 1980 as the Mexican edition of American fashion magazine Vogue, ceasing publication between 1995 and 1999. Based in Miami, Vogue Latinoamérica began publication in 1999 as the Latin American edition Vogue.

== History ==
=== Carta Editorial period (1980–1995) ===
Vogue México began publication in 1980. In 1995 publication was suspended due to the Mexican peso crisis. Condé Nast then attempted to launch a Latin American Vogue in partnership with an Argentine publisher, these plans did not eventuate.

=== Condé Nast relaunch (1999–2002) ===
In October 1999, Condé Nast in partnership with Ideas Publishing Group relaunched Vogue México and launched Vogue Latinoamérica. During this period the magazine was titled Vogue en Español (Vogue in Spanish). Vogue en Español was based in Miami, distributed across 20 Latin American countries and select U.S. cities with Spanish-speaking populations. A Latin American edition of Vogue was previously published between 1918 to 1923 from Havana, Cuba. Known as Vogue Spanish Edition, it was edited by Hugh C. Barr.

From 1999 to the mid 2000s, Vogue en Español was also distributed as Vogue Argentina, Vogue Chile, Vogue Colombia, Vogue Peru, and Vogue Venezuela.

=== Under Eva Hughes (2002–2012) ===
In 2002, Eva Hughes was appointed editor-in-chief of Vogue México y Latinoamérica. Hughes exited the magazine in 2012 and named CEO of Condé Nast México y Latinoamérica.

=== Under Kelly Talamas (2012–2016) ===
Kelly Talamas replaced Eva Hughes in 2012. Talamas previously served as fashion director and joined the magazine in 2007 as editorial coordinator. In 2016, she was appointed as Creative Director for Condé Nast Mexico y Latinoamérica.

=== Under Karla Martinez de Salas (2016–2026) ===
Karla Martínez de Salas was appointed as editor-in-chief for the magazine in June 2016. Previously Martínez served as associate editor.

== Editors ==
Vogue México
Circulation	Editor-in-chief	Start year	End year
1980–1995	Waldemar Verdugo Fuentes	1980	1985
1980–1995	Noé Agudo García	1986	1995
1999–present	Eva Hughes	2002	2012
1999–present	Kelly Talamas	2012	2016
1999–present	Karla Martínez de Salas	2016	2026
1999–present	Atenea Morales de la Cruz	2026	present

Vogue Latinoamérica
Circulation	Editor-in-chief	Start year	End year
1999–present	Eva Hughes	2002	2012
1999–present	Kelly Talamas	2012	2016
1999–present	Karla Martínez de Salas	2016	2026
1999–present	Atenea Morales de la Cruz	2026	present

== Editions ==
The editions listed below are or were published in supplement to the magazine.

- Vogue Belleza (unknown–present)
- Vogue Business (unknown–unknown)
- Vogue Hombre (2009–present)
- Vogue Novias (unknown–unknown)
- Vogue Travel y Shops Guide (unknown–present)

== See also ==
- List of Vogue México cover models
