= Tour Ma Vie World Tour =

2025–2026 concert tour by Doja Cat

- World tour by Doja Cat
- Promotional poster
- Location: Africa; Asia; Europe; North America; Oceania; South America
- Associated album: Vie
- Start date: November 18, 2025
- End date: December 1, 2026
- Legs: 6
- No. of shows: 63
- Supporting acts: Sailorr; Naomi Sharon; Latto
- Website: www.dojacat.com/tour/

Doja Cat concert chronology
- The Scarlet Tour (2023–2024); Ma Vie World Tour (2025–2026)

Tour Ma Vie World Tour (French: [vi]; transl. Tour My Life World Tour) is the third concert tour by American rapper and singer Doja Cat, in support of her fifth studio album, Vie (2025). The tour began on November 18, 2025, in Auckland, New Zealand and will conclude on December 1, 2026 in New York City, United States. American singer and songwriter Sailorr is the opening act for the Oceania and Asia leg. Naomi Sharon is the opening act for the Europe Leg.

== Background ==
On September 26, 2025, Doja Cat released her fifth studio album Vie. The first single "Jealous Type" was released on August 21, 2025, alongside the tour's 2025 dates announcement. Tickets pre-sale started on August 25, 2025 with the generale sale slated for August 28. The tour will mark Doja's first ever arena tour in Oceania and Asia. On August 28, 2025, a second show in Sydney was added due to high demand. On September 29, 2025, Doja Cat announced 2026 dates for her tour scheduled to take place in South America, Europe & North America from February through December 2026. Presale tickets open on October 1, 2025, with the general sale starting October 3 for Latin America and Europe. In North America, presale begins October 7, followed by the general sale on October 10.

On February 13, 2026, Global Citizen and Doja Cat revealed the Africa dates for Move Afrika in-house tour.

== Set list ==
This set list is from the November 18, 2025, concert in Auckland.

1. "Cards"
2. "Get Into It (Yuh)"
3. "Kiss Me More"
4. "Gorgeous"
5. "Take Me Dancing"
6. "Woman"
7. "Acts of Service"
8. "Agora Hills"
9. "Make It Up"
10. "All Mine"
11. "Ain't Shit"
12. "Paint the Town Red"
13. "Silly! Fun!"
14. "Juicy"
15. "Need to Know"
16. "Streets"
17. "Wet Vagina"
18. "WYM Freestyle"
19. "Demons"
20. "Tia Tamera"
21. "AAAHH MEN!"
22. "I'm a Man"
23. "Boss Bitch"
24. "One More Time"
25. "Say So"
26. "Stranger"
27. "Jealous Type"

=== Alterations ===
- "Lipstain", "Couples Therapy", and "Happy" were added to the set list and "I'm A Man" was removed from the setlist on May 19, 2026 in Dublin, Ireland.
- "Cyber Sex", "You Right", "Shutcho", "Okayyy", "97", and "Balut" were added to the set list on October 1, 2026, in Detroit, United States.

== Tour dates ==
List of 2025 concerts, showing date, city, country, venue, support act(s), attendance and gross
Date (2025)	City	Country	Venue	Support act(s)	Attendance	Gross
November 18	Auckland	New Zealand	Spark Arena	Sailorr	—	—
November 22	Perth	Australia	RAC Arena	Sailorr	—	—
November 25	Melbourne	Australia	Rod Laver Arena	Sailorr	—	—
November 29	Brisbane	Australia	Brisbane Entertainment Centre	Sailorr	—	—
December 1	Sydney	Australia	Qudos Bank Arena	Sailorr	25,991	$3,339,590
December 2	Sydney	Australia	Qudos Bank Arena	Sailorr	25,991	$3,339,590
December 7	Pasay (Note: Labeled as Manila in promotional material.)	Philippines	SM Mall of Asia Arena	Sailorr	—	—
December 10	Singapore		Singapore Indoor Stadium	Sailorr	—	—
December 13	Seoul	South Korea	Kintex Hall 10	Sailorr	—	—
December 15	Yokohama (Note: Labeled as Tokyo in promotional material.)	Japan	K-Arena Yokohama	Sailorr	—	—
December 18	Bangkok	Thailand	Impact Exhibition Hall	Sailorr	—	—
December 21	Kaohsiung	Taiwan	Kaohsiung Arena	Sailorr	—	—

List of 2026 concerts, showing date, city, country, venue, support act(s), attendance and gross
Date (2026)	City	Country	Venue	Support act(s)	Attendance	Gross
February 5	São Paulo	Brazil	Suhai Music Hall	—N/a	—	—
February 10	Santiago	Chile	Movistar Arena	—N/a	—	—
February 13	Lima	Peru	Arena 1	—N/a	—	—
February 15	Bogotá	Colombia	Movistar Arena	—N/a	—	$438,484
February 18	Mexico City	Mexico	Palacio de los Deportes	—N/a	—	—
March 17 (Note: Part of Global Citizen's Move Afrika Festival.)	Kigali	Rwanda	BK Arena	—N/a	—	—
March 20	Pretoria	South Africa	SunBet Arena	—N/a	—	—
May 19	Dublin	Ireland	3Arena	Naomi Sharon	—	—
May 21	Glasgow	Scotland	OVO Hydro	Naomi Sharon	—	—
May 23	Manchester	England	Co-op Live	Naomi Sharon	—	—
May 26	Birmingham	England	Utilita Arena	Naomi Sharon	—	—
May 29	London	England	The O_{2} Arena	Naomi Sharon	—	—
June 2	Lisbon	Portugal	MEO Arena	Naomi Sharon	—	—
June 6	Décines-Charpieu (Note: Labeled as Lyon in promotional material.)	France	LDLC Arena	Naomi Sharon	—	—
June 9	Paris	France	Accor Arena	Naomi Sharon	—	—
June 12	Amsterdam	Netherlands	Ziggo Dome	Naomi Sharon	—	—
June 15	Hamburg	Germany	Barclays Arena	Naomi Sharon	—	—
June 17	Berlin	Germany	Uber Arena	Naomi Sharon	—	—
June 19	Kraków	Poland	Tauron Arena	Naomi Sharon	—	—
October 1	Detroit	United States	Little Caesars Arena	Latto	—	—
October 3	Chicago	United States	United Center	Latto	—	—
October 4	Minneapolis	United States	Target Center	Latto	—	—
October 6	Kansas City	United States	T-Mobile Center	Latto	—	—
October 8	Denver	United States	Ball Arena	Latto	—	—
October 10	West Valley City (Note: Labeled as Salt Lake City in promotional material.)	United States	Maverik Center	Latto	—	—
October 13	Vancouver	Canada	Rogers Arena	Latto	—	—
October 15	Seattle	United States	Climate Pledge Arena	Latto	—	—
October 17	Portland	United States	Moda Center	Latto	—	—
October 20	Sacramento	United States	Golden 1 Center	Latto	—	—
October 22	Inglewood (Note: Labeled as Los Angeles in promotional material.)	United States	Kia Forum	Latto	—	—
October 25	San Francisco	United States	Chase Center	Latto	—	—
October 27	San Diego	United States	Viejas Arena	Latto	—	—
October 29	Phoenix	United States	Mortgage Matchup Center	Latto	—	—
October 31	Paradise (Note: Labeled as Las Vegas in promotional material.)	United States	T-Mobile Arena	Latto	—	—
November 3	Austin	United States	Moody Center	Latto	—	—
November 4	Dallas	United States	American Airlines Center	Latto	—	—
November 6	San Antonio	United States	Frost Bank Center	Latto	—	—
November 7	Houston	United States	Toyota Center	Latto	—	—
November 11	Miami	United States	Kaseya Center	Latto	—	—
November 13	Tampa	United States	Benchmark International Arena	Latto	—	—
November 14	Orlando	United States	Kia Center	Latto	—	—
November 17	Atlanta	United States	State Farm Arena	Latto	—	—
November 18	Charlotte	United States	Spectrum Center	Latto	—	—
November 20	Baltimore	United States	CFG Bank Arena	Latto	—	—
November 21	Washington, D.C.	United States	Capital One Arena	Latto	—	—
November 23	Boston	United States	TD Garden	Latto	—	—
November 25	Toronto	Canada	Scotiabank Arena	Latto	—	—
November 27	Montreal	Canada	Bell Centre	Latto	—	—
November 29	Philadelphia	United States	Xfinity Mobile Arena	Latto	—	—
December 1	New York City	United States	Madison Square Garden	Latto	—	—

=== Postponed concerts ===
List of cancelled concerts showing date, city, country, venue and reason
Date (2026)	City	Country	Venue	Reason
May 16	Sakhir	Bahrain	Beyon Al Dana Amphitheatre	2026 Iran war
June 4 (Note: Intended to be a part of Primavera Sound.)	Barcelona	Spain	Parc del Fòrum	Weather conditions
