= Jim Radakovich =

American sculptor and painter

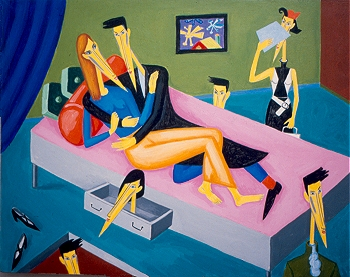
- Peepers, Acrylic on Canvas, 16" x 20", 1984
- Born: Illinois, United States of America
- Education: Maryland Institute College of Art
- Known for: Painting, Sculpture
- Movement: East Village
- Family: Anka Radakovich (sister)

Jim Radakovich is an American sculptor and painter living and working in New York City. He was a key figure in the East Village art scene in New York from 1982 to 1987 often showing together both Neo-Surrealist paintings and totem-like sculpture. He frequently exhibited with other artists who emerged at the time, including Kiki Smith, David Wojnarowicz, George Condo, Rick Prol, Peter Schuyff, Mark Kostabi and Marilyn Minter.

== Early life ==
Radakovich was born in Illinois, the son of a corporate executive and an opera singer. His sister is the writer Anka Radakovich. He grew up in Ohio and finished high school in Maryland. After graduating from the Maryland Institute, College of Art with a BFA, he moved to New York City.

== Work ==
Radakovich's style is a combination of Appropriation, Neo-Expressionism and Neo-Surrealism. In his paintings, he uses cryptic relationships, sexual scenarios and psychologically charged tableaux. His Surrealistic atmospheres, cartoon like drawing and appropriated Modigliani-like heads are painted in a linear but expressionist technique. The paintings are frontal and highly colored often evoking the space of Indian miniatures. The sculptural works often incorporate totem structures that stack body parts and biomorphic elements. Although inspired by primitive cultural forms, the totems are modern urban signposts containing the dramas of city life. Disrupted narratives beg the viewer to unravel the tale that is set before them. His paintings are filled with urban dramas where the participants struggle with the problems of modern life, often with comical results. The figures in his work are posed in psychologically ambiguous terms. The elongated heads are Icons of humans in a mechanized society grappling with the questions of desire and nature.

Radakovich's work has entered the collections of many prominent American tastemakers including fashion designer Todd Oldham, Ford Model's owner Katie Ford and hotelier Andre Balazs.

== Career ==
=== 1980s ===
As the East Village art scene gained momentum in 1982, numerous group shows lead to his first one-person show at Kamikaze in Chelsea in 1983. He came to prominence by exhibiting, in the East Village, both paintings and sculpture at shows at Sensory Evolution in 1984 and again in 1985.

Radakovich and his contemporaries were first documented in Arts Magazine in September 1985. Written by critic Robert Pincus-Witten and photographed by Timothy Greenfield-Sanders for Arts Magazine, "The New Irascibles" an essay and portfolio of photographs was based on the celebrated photograph "The Irascibles" of the Abstract-Expressionist Group taken by Nina Leen in 1951. It was meant as a historical overview and photographic record to preserve the participants of a short-lived scene in Manhattan where entrepreneurial artists and dealers opened their own galleries during the period between 1982 and 1987. After that time, most of these galleries and artists were absorbed into the Soho art world eager for new talent and they ultimately ushered in the explosion of the 80's art market boom.

Solo shows at Bridgewater/Lustberg in 1986 and 1987 were followed by B-Side Gallery in 1986 and St. Marks Gallery in 1987.

=== 1990s ===
An important survey of work from 1984 to 1991 was exhibited at the Washington County Museum of Fine Arts in 1991. Radakovich had one person shows at the Takahashi Gallery in 1993 in Nagoya Japan, John McAdams Gallery 1995 in Chicago and Mat Thornton Gallery 1998 in Washington D.C.

=== 2000 and after ===
After a one-person show in 2001 at the Sarah Denning Gallery in Chelsea, Radakovich continued to exhibit in groups shows in New York.

An update of the East Village Art scene was included in the November 1999 issue of Art Forum. The historical significance of this group of artists was established by "East Village USA" at the New Museum of Contemporary Art in New York City in December 2004 and satellite shows at the B-Side Gallery's "East Village ASU" and the Hal Bromm Gallery's "Vintage East Village" in January 2005 in which Radakovich's work was exhibited.

==== Exhibitions ====
In September 2011 Radakovich was exhibited at The Clay Center for the Arts and Sciences in Charleston, West Virginia, as part of their permanent collection, called “Preserving a Legacy: 25 Years of Collecting”.

The group show, “Crossing Houston” at the Smart Clothes Gallery on the Lower East Side in New York City, featured Radakovich in a survey of important artists from the East Village scene. September 11 to Oct. 11, 2012.

Radakovich recently participated in December 2012 at the Overture | Miami pavilion with the Sensory Evolution Gallery as part of the Art | Basel Miami Beach contemporary art fair.
