= Ashley Brokaw =

American casting director (born c. 1973)

Ashley Brokaw (born c. 1973) is an American fashion casting director, known for her work with Italian luxury fashion house Prada. In 2015, The New York Times said she is "the person who is most responsible for what we think is beautiful."

== Early life ==
Brokaw was raised in England, and then came to the United States to go to boarding school in Connecticut. Brokaw has a Bachelor of Science degree in international law and organization from the Foreign Service School at Georgetown University.

== Career ==
Brokaw is known for her work casting models in fashion shows. At age 17, Brokaw interned for Juliet Taylor, a movie casting director. She started her career in fashion working at Seventeen, then as a production assistant for the photographer Bruce Weber.

Since 2011, Brokaw principally casts for Prada where she replaced Russell Marsh. She has also worked with Balenciaga, Rag & Bone, Proenza Schouler, Nicolas Ghesquière at Louis Vuitton, Coach New York, and JW Anderson.

In 2017 she spoke with Vogue about the increased importance of the 'personal style' of models. By 2021, Brokaw was expanding her search parameters for models to include videos so she can gauge personalities of potential models. In 2022, she publicly supported Ukrainian models following the Russian invasion of Ukraine.

=== Models ===
Models scouted or selected by Brokaw Model	Nationality
Mica Argañaraz	Argentine
Alex Binaris	South African
Jamie Bochert	American
Malaika Firth	British
Daphne Groeneveld	Dutch
Willow Hand	American
Ondria Hardin	American
Ulrikke Høyer	Danish
Aya Jones	French
HoYeon Jung	South Korean
Harleth Kuusik	Estonian
Fernanda Ly	Australian
Melodie Monrose	French (Martinican)
Lineisy Montero	Dominican
Amalie and Cecilie Moosgaard	Danish
Alexandra Micu	Romanian
Amanda Murphy	American
Caroline Brasch Nielsen	Danish
Julia Nobis	Australian
Bambi Northwood-Blyth	Australian
Hanne Gaby Odiele	Belgian
Teddy Quinlivan	American
Rianne Van Rompaey	Dutch
Fei Fei Sun	Chinese
Mona Tougaard	Danish
Maartje Verhoef	Dutch
Yasmin Wijnaldum	Dutch
Kiki Willems	Dutch
Sora Choi	South Korean
