= Agneta Frieberg =

Swedish female model (1945–1971)

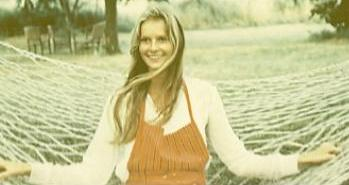
- 1967
- Born: 2 June 1945; Sweden
- Died: 14 May 1971 (aged 25); Paris, France
- Citizenship: Swedish; American
- Occupations: Fashion model; activist
- Years active: 1959–71 (model); 1968–71 (activist)
- Partner(s): Jack Youngerman; Louis Faurer
- Modeling information
- Height: 5 ft 10 in (177.8 cm)
- Hair color: Blonde
- Eye color: Blue
- Agency: Ford (international)

Agneta Marianne Bengtsdotter Frieberg (2 June 1945 – 10 May 1971) was a Swedish fashion model and activist. She was known for her extensive editorial and commercial appearances throughout the 1960s, resulting in a decade-long career under the Ford Modeling agency.

In 1960, at the age of 14, Frieberg was signed by Eileen Ford to Ford Models. After relocating to California, she appeared on over 100 covers for publications including Vogue, Elle, Mademoiselle and Glamour, among others. Frieberg served as the face of Clairol's Great Body product line from 1967 until her death. Frieberg was often characterized by her signature waist-length hair and "girl next door" appeal. By the late-1960s, Frieberg had become less active as a model and focused more on her activist work in the anti-war and civil rights movements of the time.

In 1971, Frieberg fell from the top story of a hotel in Paris, France. She was rushed to the American Hospital of Paris, where she remained for four days before dying of injuries on 10 May. Her death was subject to widespread media coverage due to its odd circumstances, with conspiracies having developed over her cause of death.

In her lifetime, Frieberg was recognized as "one of the first supermodels" by publications including Glamour. Frieberg's success in modeling led to her receiving the third highest salary of a fashion model in her era, following behind Twiggy and Veruschka. In 2011, The Agneta Frieberg Foundation was established in honor of Frieberg and her life.

== Early life ==
=== Childhood ===
Frieberg was born on 2 June 1945 in Sweden. While in her teenage years, Agneta and her family moved from Sweden to Marin County, California. Frieberg's mother, Cecilia Frieberg, was a Montessori school teacher and her father, Bengt O. Frieberg, was a businessman and inventor. Agneta was the oldest of four children. Her youngest sister, Helena, also became a Ford model.

=== Discovery ===
In 1959, Frieberg and her parents along with brother, Magnus, and sister, Marianne, moved to California from their native country Sweden. They took a vacation the following year to New York City. While walking around New York, Frieberg caught the attention of Ford Models owner and modeling agent Eileen Ford. Ford quickly approached Frieberg to discuss signing to the Ford Modeling agency. Frieberg was granted permission from her parents and signed to Ford soon after. Her career started shortly after she went home to Marin County.

== Modeling career ==
=== Breakthrough ===
Frieberg worked out of California in the early 1960s, modeling for publications like Good Housekeeping and Mademoiselle and doing catalogue work during this time. She later won the Canadian pageant, Miss Model of the Year. By 1963, Frieberg relocated to New York City for work. While there, she began her professional expansion by taking on runway and commercial work. Frieberg appeared on the cover of over 100 magazines, including Glamour (July 1964, March and June 1965, and December 1967), Mademoiselle (April, May, July, September, and December 1964, May and February 1967, May 1968, and October 1969), McCall's (January 1963), Good Housekeeping (April and September 1965 and February 1967), HairDo (May 1965), Ingenue (August 1965), RedBook (February 1966), and Elle (April 1966).

=== Established career ===
In February 1966, in an issue of the magazine Glamour, the editors described Frieberg along with nineteen other models as a "supermodel", describing Frieberg as "innocent, tall, and fresh." That same year, Frieberg was the cover model for Glamour's Beauty Book and had a profile written by her. Later in 1966, she appeared in the famous Ormond Gigli photo of the sixties' top Ford models.

==== Great Body campaign ====
In the mid-1960s, Frieberg appeared on the bottle of Clairol's hair product "Great Body". Frieberg also appeared in several advertisements, and commercials for the Great Body products. The line became Frieberg's commercial breakthrough in the US, resulting in a line of towels, posters, and other merchandise being distributed with Frieberg's image on it. Following Frieberg's death, she remained on the cover of the product line for another two years while a commercial featuring her riding a rollercoaster continued to air after her death as well.

=== Acting ventures ===
Frieberg briefly appeared in her long-time boyfriend Louis Faurer's documentary Time Capsule, which captured Time Square and other parts of New York City over a span of several years. The film was recently rediscovered after being lost in Faurer's archives. The film was aired in a show at Milwaukee Museum in New York City.

In 1966, she appeared on an episode of the television show The Man from U.N.C.L.E. alongside Kathy McCallum.

== Death ==
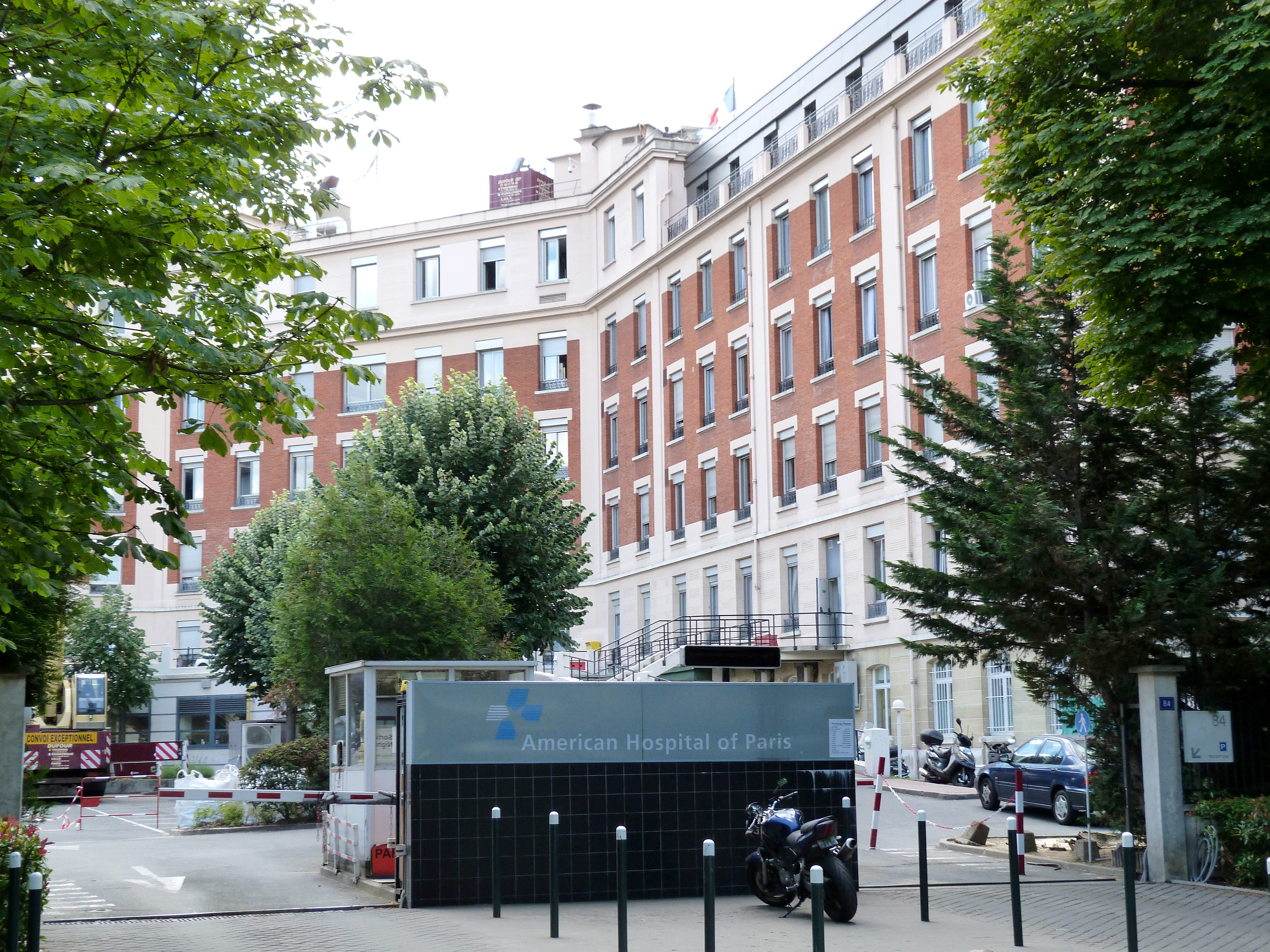
The American Hospital of Paris

In 1971, at the age of twenty-five, Frieberg died in Paris, France. She was staying in a hotel on the top floor, when she fell out of the window. She lingered in a coma at the American Hospital of Paris for ten days until eventually dying on 10 May 1971, which happened to be Mother's Day. There was speculation that Frieberg had been pushed instead of falling. The autopsy showed that Frieberg had no drugs or alcohol in her system at the time of her death. American author Michael Gross wrote false claims about Frieberg in his book Model: The Ugly Business of Beautiful Women, where he referred to her as a German model who died while on drugs.

Models Pat Cleveland and Ulla Andersson recounted stories of Frieberg in their respective memoirs.

== Personal life ==
For the majority of her career, Frieberg commuted between California and New York, though she often travelled back to Sweden to family and various other European countries for shoots. She maintained close friendships with fellow Ford model Ulla Jones, actresses Jane Fonda and Delphine Seyrig, and model Cheryl Tiegs.

In Frieberg's spare time, her interests including singing, writing, playing guitar and piano, horseback riding, and ballet. She was also a frequent reader, reading between shots, with her favourite author being Ernest Hemingway.

=== Relationships ===
For two years, Frieberg dated rock musician and guitarist Jimi Hendrix from the band The Jimi Hendrix Experience. Frieberg also dated Jack Youngerman for several years.

Frieberg was commissioned to be the faux girlfriend to pop art artist Andy Warhol, according to Warhol's biographer Gerard Malanga. Warhol made her the subject of several of his photographs and films.

== See also ==
- 1960s in Western fashion
- Swedish people
