= Giselle Norman =

English fashion model

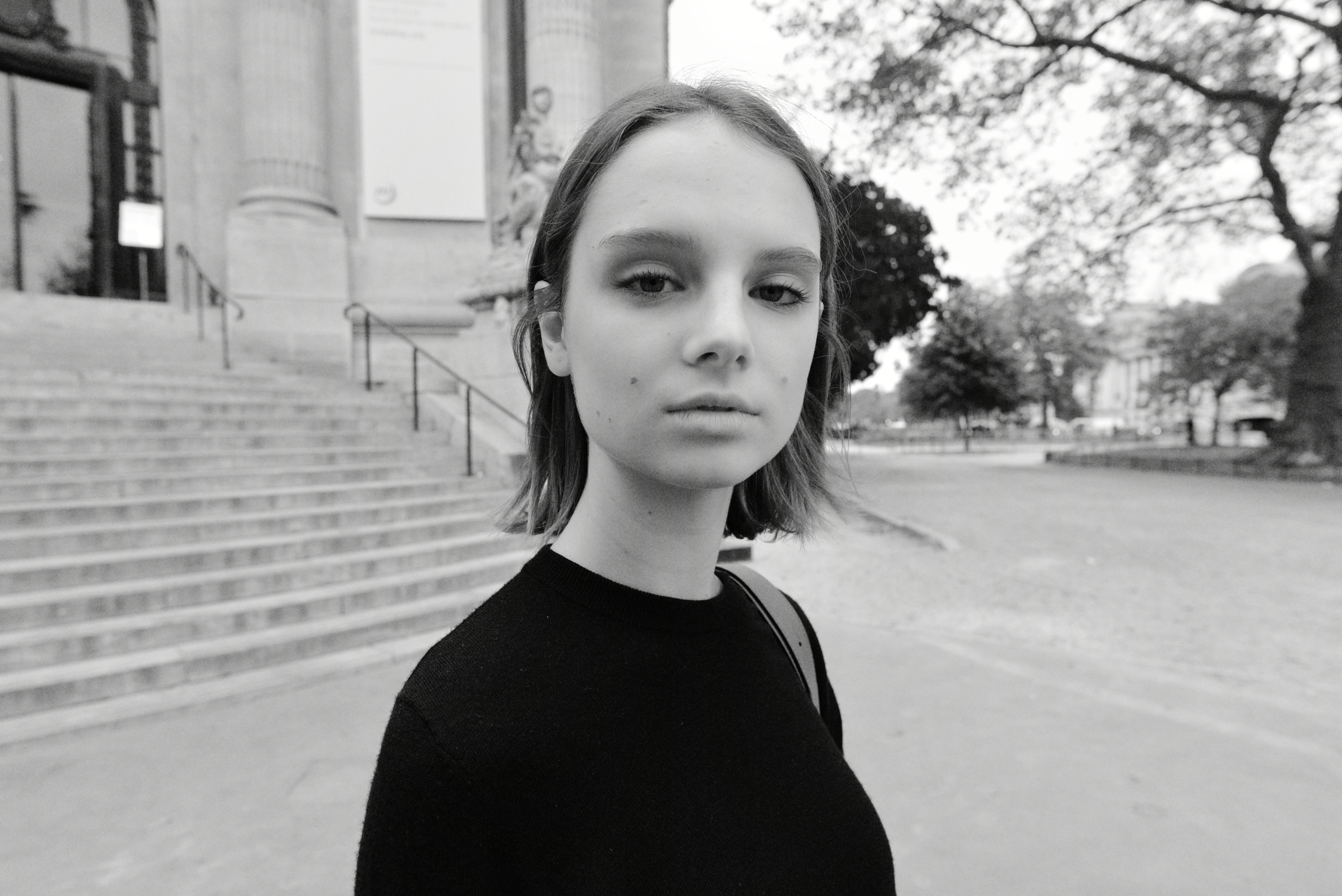
- Norman in 2018
- Born: 16 January 2001 (age 25); London, England
- Occupation: Fashion model
- Modelling information
- Height: 1.75 m (5 ft 9 in)
- Hair colour: Brown
- Eye colour: Blue-green
- Agency: Elite Model Management (New York); Ford Models (Paris); The Fabbrica (Milan); Premier Management (London) (mother agency)

Giselle Isabella P. Norman is an English fashion model.

In December 2024, Models.com added Norman to their 'Money List', saying that she had "attracted top-tier commercial clients and secured lucrative, long-term endorsement deals."

== Early life ==
Norman is the oldest of four girls. She grew up in Petworth, West Sussex.

== Career ==
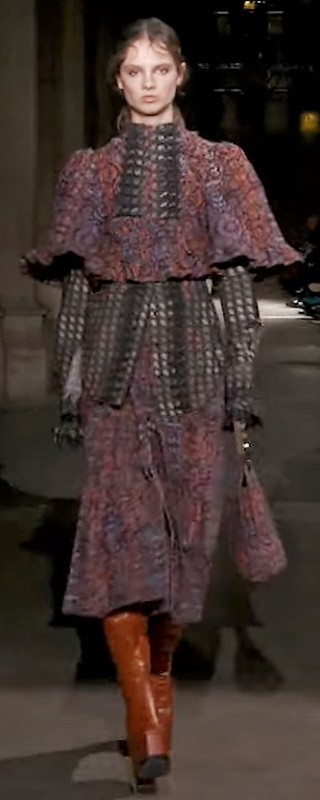
Norman walks the runway at the Paco Rabanne Fall–Winter 2020–2021 show

After struggling academically, Norman decided to drop out of Bryanston School and model full time. She was discovered by Storm Management at a restaurant. She debuted as an exclusive at JW Anderson's A/W 2018 show, selected by casting director Ashley Brokaw to open the show. She walked for Dior, Chloé, Paco Rabanne, Loewe, Miu Miu, Sonia Rykiel, Valentino, and Louis Vuitton. In the A/W 2019 season, she walked in 38 shows for brands including Chanel, Fendi, Versace, Stella McCartney, Michael Kors, Lanvin, and Victoria Beckham. Norman has appeared in American Vogue, Vogue Italia, Vogue Japan, British Vogue, WSJ, Dazed, and i-D.
