= Nataliya Gotsiy =

Ukrainian model

Nataliia Gotsii
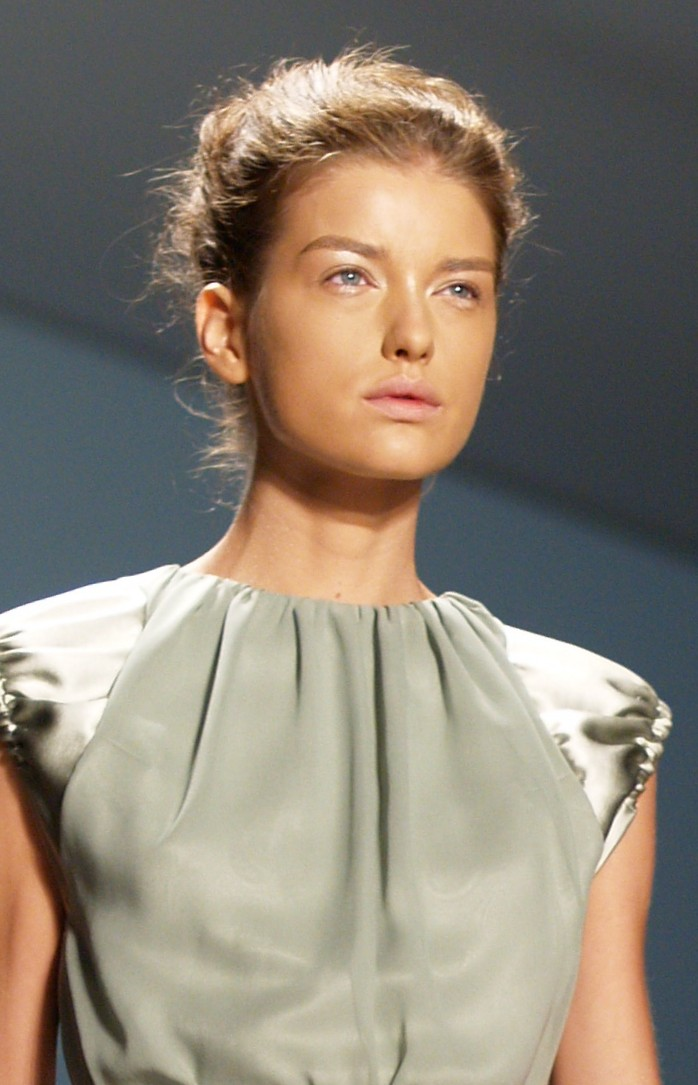
- Nataliia Gotsii modeling in Doo.Ri Spring 2007 show, New York Fashion Week, 15 September 2006
- Born: 10 July 1985 (age 41); Ukraine
- Modeling information
- Height: 5 ft 9 in (1.75 m)
- Hair color: brown
- Eye color: blue

Nataliya Gotsii (Ukrainian: Наталія Гоцій; born 10 July 1985) is a Ukrainian fashion model and television personality. She was the winner of the Ford Supermodel of the World 2004 search.

== Work ==
Gotsiy has appeared on the cover of French Elle and Italian Marie Claire and modeled for Behnaz Sarafpour, Christian Lacroix, Diane von Furstenberg, Dior, Dolce & Gabbana, Dries van Noten, Gucci, Oscar de la Renta, Valentino, Vivienne Westwood, Marc Jacobs, Adolfo Araiza and others.

After a long hiatus from the fashion industry and the birth of her first child, Gotsiy has re-emerged in editorial work. She was seen in a very brief cameo in the casting video for the 2009 Victoria's Secret Fashion Show, a company she worked for back in 2006. The appearance sparked speculation that she may be planning a comeback.

In 2019 began presenting reality television series Podium, Ukrainian version of American Project Runway.

== Controversy ==
Amid rising concerns about underweight runway models and their influence on women's body image, pictures of models began to circulate throughout the news media around the world. Gotsiy became a target of this controversy. Pictures of her wearing a loose, ribcage and back revealing top from the Spring 2007 Guy Laroche runway show became prominent examples of underweight runway models that have often been used in the fashion industry in recent years. These pictures show well-defined ribcage and backbones poking through underneath her skin that otherwise would not be as noticeable in a healthier person. She denied claims of her having an eating disorder. She also states that other Ukrainian girls in the industry are no different and that she was a victim of Photoshopping. As a result of the media's widespread circulation of the Guy Laroche runway pictures, Gotsiy has since had difficulty in acquiring modeling jobs.

Later in 2021, she admitted to having anorexia and bulimia during her modelling years
