= Anneliese Seubert =

Australian model (born 1973)

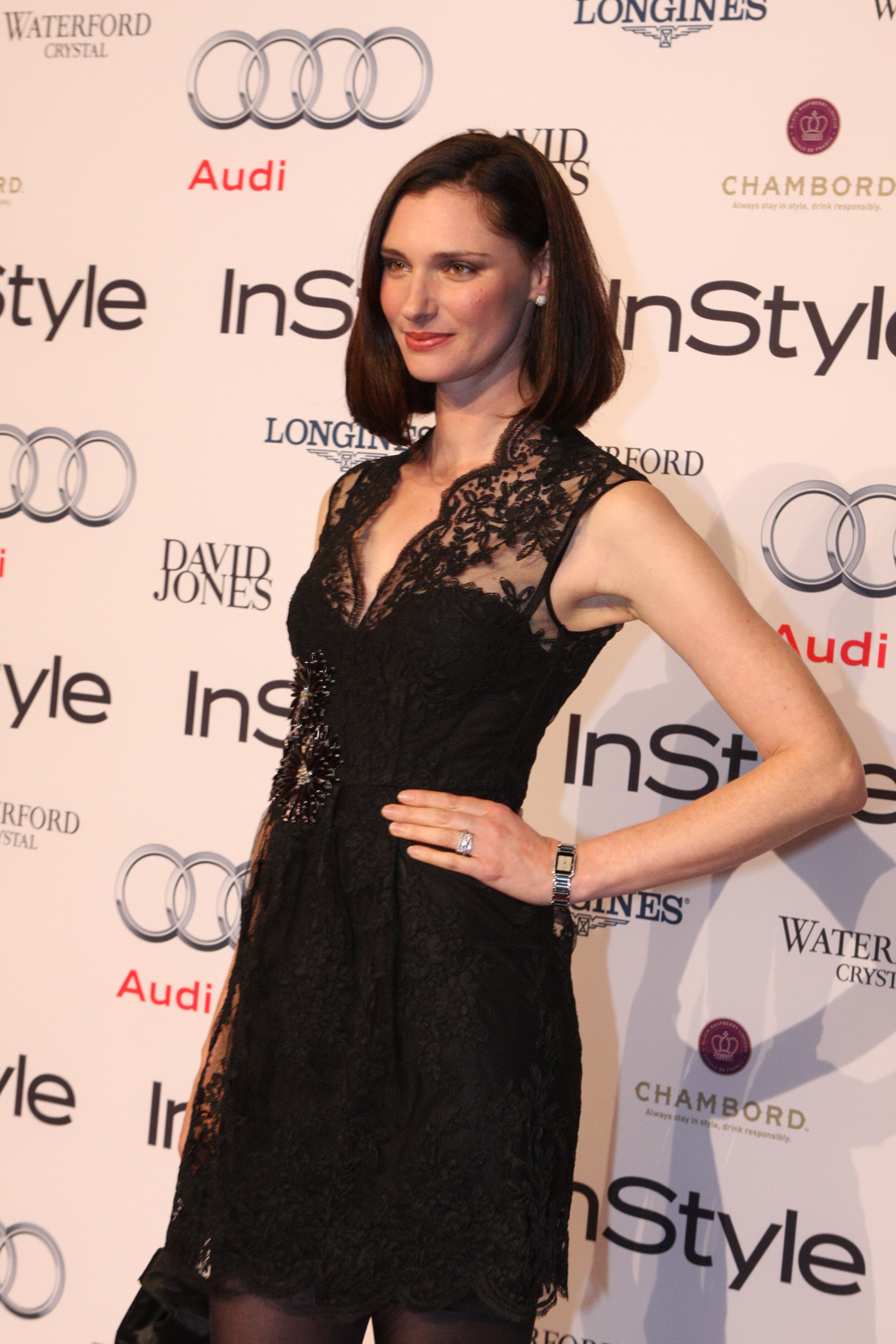
- Born: 1973; Bavaria, Germany
- Modeling information
- Height: 5 ft 11 in (1.80 m)

Anneliese Seubert (born 1973) is an Australian model. She was born in Germany and moved to Cooma, Australia with her family aged nine. She was a finalist in the Dolly Covergirl competition, following which she began modelling when she was 15 years old. Seubert won the 1990 Ford Supermodel of the World contest at 17 receiving a $250,000 modelling contract with Ford Models. Following this she furthered her modeling, mainly in Paris where she walked the runway for designers and fashion houses such as Christian Dior, Givenchy, Paco Rabanne, Sonia Rykiel, Christian Lacroix, Karl Lagerfeld, John Galliano and Yves Saint-Laurent.
