= Gessinger =

Gessinger (German pronunciation: [ˈgɛsɪŋɐ]) is a German surname.

== Notable people ==
Notable people with this surname include:

- Humberto Gessinger (born 1963), Brazilian musician
- Julius Gessinger (de) (1899-1986), German composer
- Marie-Christine Gessinger (1992-2010), Austrian model
- Nils Gessinger (de) (born 1964), German musician
- Seff Gessinger (de) (1915-1988), German composer
