= The Society Management =

Modeling agency

- Founded: 2013; 13 years ago
- Headquarters: New York City, U.S.
- Key people: Chris Gay (CEO)
- Parent: Elite World Group
- Website: www.thesocietymanagement.com

The Society Management, or more commonly referred to as The Society or simply just Society, is a talent management and modelling agency based in New York City. It was established in 2013 and serves as the official U.S. division of the Elite World Group.

== Talent ==
The agency represents both men and women, in addition to a celebrity and creatives board that consist of influencers, athletes, musicians, and artists.

=== Models ===
- Aiden Curtiss
- Amber Valletta
- Arlenis Sosa
- Birgit Kos
- Camille Rowe
- Caroline Brasch Nielsen
- Caroline Trentini
- Cindy Bruna
- Cora Emmanuel
- Faretta
- Fran Summers
- Grace Elizabeth
- Greta Hofer
- Harleth Kuusik
- Irina Shayk
- Jacquelyn Jablonski
- Jasmine Sanders
- Julia Banaś
- Karlie Kloss
- Kate Bock
- Kendall Jenner
- Kōki
- Lindsey Wixson
- Liu Wen
- Luma Grothe
- Mika Schneider
- Molly Bair
- Mona Tougaard
- Nathan Westling
- Nina Marker
- Quannah ChasingHorse
- Ruth and May Bell
- Sara Grace Wallerstedt
- Staz Lindes
- Tami Williams
- Ugbad Abdi
- Vittoria Ceretti
- Yasmin Wijnaldum
- Yoon Young Bae
- Yuka Mannami
- Yumi Nu

=== Creatives & Celebrities ===
- Ciara
- Jaden Smith
- Jaylen Brown
- Pamela Anderson
- Russell Westbrook
- Russell Wilson
- Saint Jhn
- Tao Okamoto
- Willow Smith

== See also ==
- List of modeling agencies
