= Ugbad =

Ugbad is a feminine given name of Somali origin. Notable people with the surname include:

- Ugbad Abdi, Somali and American fashion model
- Ugbad Sadiq, see Ugbad and Rahma Sadiq, Somali-born Norwegian sisters who joined ISIL
