= Ford Models Supermodel of the World =

International Competition

- Status: Inactive
- Genre: Model search competition
- Frequency: Annual
- Inaugurated: 1980; 46 years ago
- Founder: Eileen Ford
- Most recent: 2013
- Website: Website

Supermodel of the World (Ford Supermodel of the Year, formerly Face of the 80s) was an international modeling contest established by Eileen Ford in 1980. The contest showcases young fashion model entrants from over 50 countries to discover new talent for the fashion industry. The winner of the international final event received a $250,000 modeling contract with Ford Models. The second and third runners-up received contracts of $150,000 and $100,000, respectively.

== Titleholders ==
Held	Winner	Country	Venue
1981	Annette Stai	Norway	Monaco
1982	Renée Simonsen	Denmark	United States
1983	Carrie Miller	United States	United States
1984	Catherine Ahnell	Sweden	United States
1985	Joanna Van Trees	United States	United States
1986	Monika Schnarre	Canada	
1987	Celia Forner	Spain	
1988	Anuschka Muzik	Czechoslovakia	
1989	Synne Myreboe	Norway	
1990	Anneliese Seubert	Australia / Germany	
1991	Daniela Benavente	Chile	
1992	Tricia Helfer	Canada	
1993	Veronica Blume	Spain / Germany	
1994	Georgia Göttmann	Germany	Hawaii, U.S.
1995	Anna Marie Cseh	Hungary	
1996	Leanne Spencer	Canada	Miami, Florida, U.S.
1997	Diana Pereira	Portugal	
1998	Loredana Školaris Katie Burell	United Kingdom	Slovenia Portugal
1999	Alyssa Kealy	Australia	
2000	Margarita Babina	Russia	Puerto Rico, U.S.
2001	Asta Buziliauskaitė	Lithuania	Miami, Florida, U.S.
2002	Dari Maximova	Germany	Dominican Republic
2003	no fount -		
2004	Nataliya Gotsiy	Ukraine	New York Public Library
2005	Camila Finn	Brazil	New York Public Library
2006	Katsia Damankova	Belarus	
2007	Sanne Nijhof	Netherlands	United States
2008	Kang Seung-hyun	Korea	
2009	Tayane Leão	Brazil	Montenegro
2010	Katrina Karlina Caune	Latvia	São Paulo, Brazil
2011	Danica Magpantay	Philippines	
2012	Sofía Polenta	Argentina	
No event since 2013–present

== Notable participants ==
Notable participants who did not win the contest include Adriana Lima, Chanel Iman, Kendra Spears, Marie-Christine Gessinger, Nadege Herrera, Charo Ronquillo, Liliane Ferrarezi, Bianca Chiminello, Bipasha Basu, Caron Bernstein, Zana Krasniqi, Paloma Lago, Malin Akerman, Elsa Benítez, Keity Mendieta, Nicole Trunfio, Shiraz Tal, Michelle Behennah, Melanie Marquez, Ly Jonaitis, and Ilaria Caprioglio.

== Hosts ==
- 1982 – Lee Majors
- 1987 - Dick Clark, Jerry Hall
- 1990 – Christie Brinkley
- 1992 – Walt Willey, Ashley Richardson
- 1993 – Walt Willey, Rachel Hunter
- 1996 – Richard Steinmetz
- 2004 – Billy Bush

== See also ==
- Ford Models
- Elite Model Look
