= Harleth Kuusik =

Estonian fashion model (born 1996)

- Born: 2 December 1996 (age 29); Tallinn, Estonia
- Modeling information
- Hair color: Blonde
- Eye color: Gray
- Agency: The Society Management (New York); Elite Model Management (Paris); Special Management (Milan); The Squad (London); View Management (Barcelona); Model Management (Hamburg); Freedom Models (Los Angeles); MJ Models (Tallinn)

Harleth Kuusik (born 2 December 1996, in Tallinn) is an Estonian fashion model.

== Career ==
Kuusik debuted in 2013, walking for Proenza Schouler. In the next year she appeared in campaigns for Schouler, Coach Inc., and Edun. She’s also appeared in campaigns for Vera Wang, Valentino, Emilio Pucci, Michael Kors, and Yves Saint Laurent Beauty. Casting director Ashley Brokaw is deemed to have launched her career. She has walked the runway for designers including Prada and Miu Miu, Louis Vuitton, Giambattista Valli (which she opened), Acne Studios, Alexander McQueen, Emanuel Ungaro, Gareth Pugh, Lanvin, Maison Martin Margiela, Paco Rabanne, Saint Laurent, Calvin Klein, Christian Dior, Alexander Wang, Givenchy, Michael Kors, Roberto Cavalli, Rick Owens, Versace, Nina Ricci, Sonia Rykiel, Chanel, Gucci, and Fendi. In the S/S 2016 season, she walked over 100 shows.

Kuusik has appeared in Russh, i-D, Dazed, Vogue Paris, Vogue Italia, Vogue Japan, and Allure.

Kuusik has previously been ranked among the "Top 50" models in the world by models.com.
