= Cora Emmanuel =

French fashion model

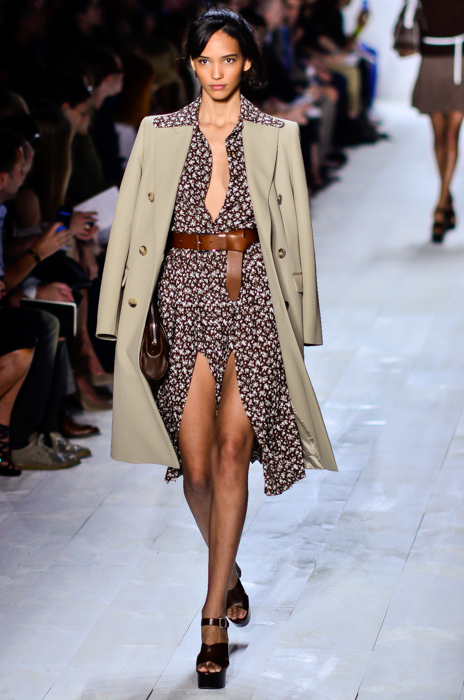
- Cora Emmanuel walking the runway for Michael Kors
- Born: Martinique, France
- Modeling information
- Height: 1.80 m (5 ft 11 in)
- Hair color: Brown
- Eye color: Brown
- Agency: The Society Management (New York); Ford Models (Paris, Los Angeles); Elite Model Management (worldwide); Premier Model Management (London); Modelwerk (Hamburg); MP Management (Stockholm); Vivien’s Model Management (Sydney)

Cora Emmanuel is a French fashion model.

== Career ==
Emmanuel's mother encouraged her to do the Elite Model Look contest, and she signed with Elite Model Management in 2008. She moved to New York City where she signed with New York Models.

In 2011, she signed with Ford Models, her current agency. After having switched to Ford, she walked for Alexander Wang, Tommy Hilfiger, Michael Kors, Kenzo, Elie Saab, Akris and Bottega Veneta (which she opened and closed). She has also walked for Valentino, Givenchy, Miu Miu, Louis Vuitton, Mugler, Jean Paul Gaultier, Stella McCartney, Marni, Dolce & Gabbana, Diane von Fürstenberg, Donna Karen, Vera Wang, Jason Wu, Tory Burch and Chanel, for whom she did a campaign.

Emmanuel has been featured on the covers of H&M Magazine, Elle Sweden , Elle Norway, Elle France, and Vogue Mexico. She has also appeared in CR Fashion Book, Allure, Glamour, Vogue Paris, Vogue Italia, and Elle.

She has done ads for Sephora, Tiffany & Co., Tommy Hilfiger, Balmain, and NARS Cosmetics.

== Personal life ==
Her father is a former architect and current architecture teacher; her mother is a history and geography teacher. She has an older sister and younger half-brother.
