= Yuka Mannami =

Japanese fashion model

- 萬波ユカ
- Born: August 23, 1992 (age 34); Mie Prefecture, Japan
- Occupation: Model
- Agents: The Society Management (New York City); Elite Model Management (Paris, London, Barcelona); Why Not Model Management (Milan); Donna Models (Tokyo) (mother agency)

Yuka Mannami (萬波ユカ, Mannami Yuka; born August 23, 1992) is a Japanese fashion model.

== Early life ==
Mannami was born August 23, 1992, in Mie Prefecture. She was a ballerina until age 18.

== Career ==
Mannami started her career as a nurse. She was discovered via Instagram when she was 23, and walked in the Fendi show in Tokyo. She has appeared in advertisements for Shiseido, Uniqlo, Givenchy, Gap Inc., Nordstrom, Aldo Shoes, and Bottega Veneta. Mannami has appeared in magazines including Teen Vogue, Harper's Bazaar Hong Kong, CR Fashion Book, Vogue Italia, and American Vogue.
