= Molly Bair =

American model

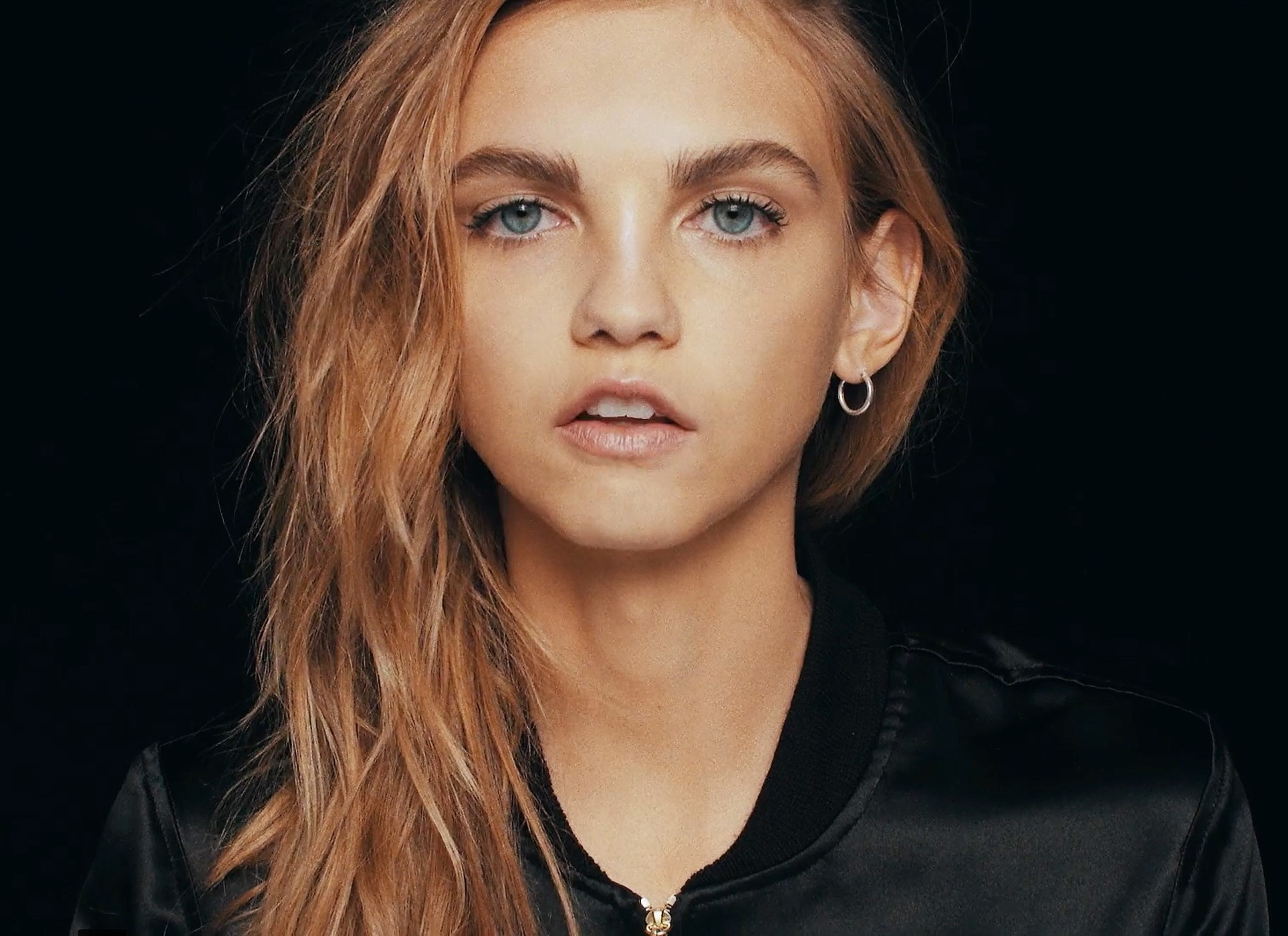
- Bair for Chaos accessories in 2016
- Born: April 25, 1997 (age 29); Philadelphia, Pennsylvania, U.S.
- Occupation: Model
- Modeling information
- Height: 6 ft 0 in (1.83 m)
- Hair color: Blonde
- Eye color: Blue
- Agency: The Society Management (New York); Elite Model Management (Paris, Milan, London, Amsterdam, Barcelona); UNIQUE DENMARK (Copenhagen)

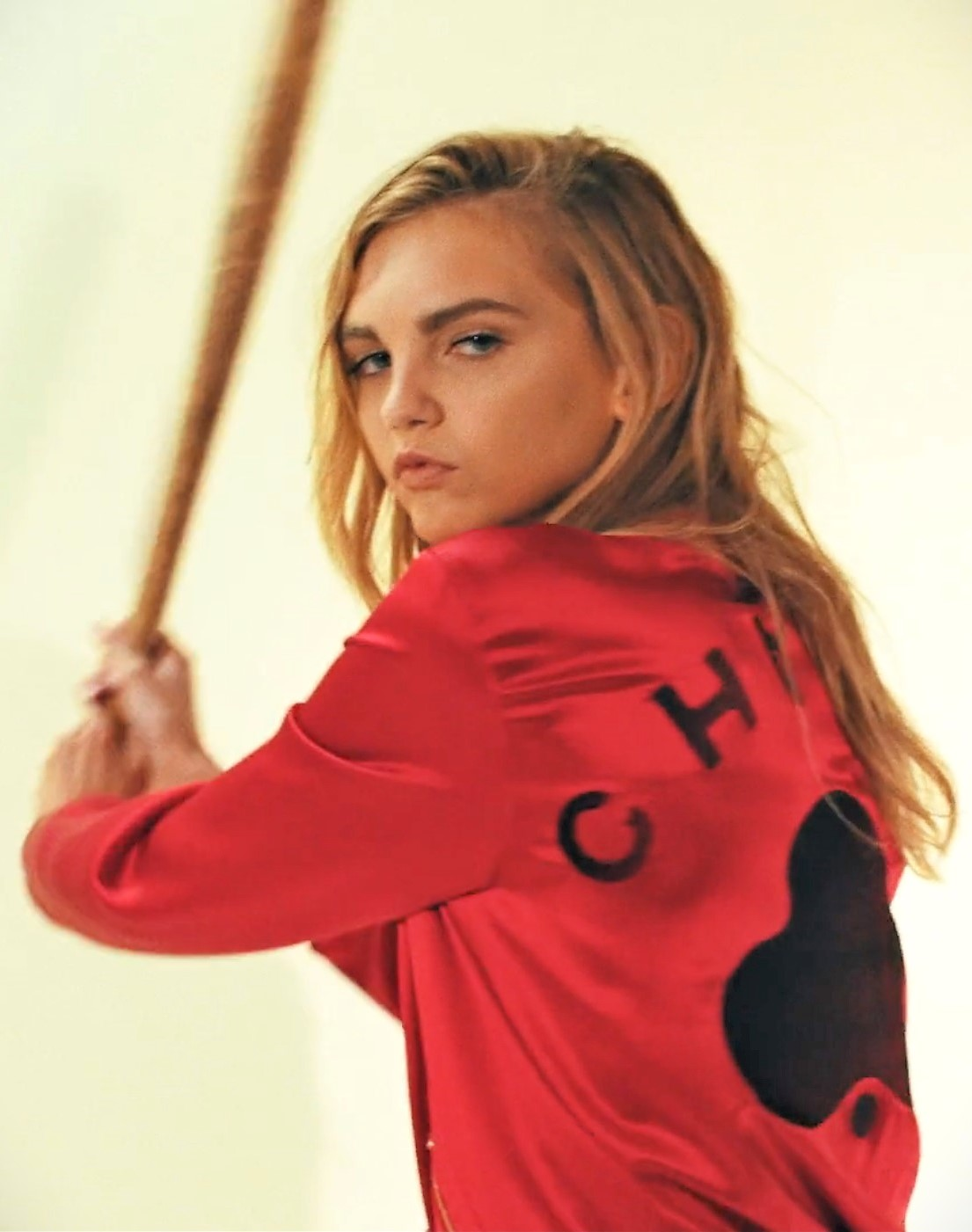
Bair for Chaos fashion accessory brand

Molly Bair (born April 25, 1997) is an American model, best known for her appearances in the Spring/Summer 2015 fashion shows.

== Life ==
Molly Bair was born April 25, 1997, in Philadelphia. During her childhood, she says, she was mocked by others because of her atypically extra-thin, 6-foot tall and had "strange face" physique. "I would never think that a girl who spent most of her childhood with a unibrow, glasses and a Yoda shirt would be in Vogue Italia, she told CNN, while saying that she was embracing an "alien-rat-demon-goblin-gremlin sort of vibe". She admitted to having been a very strange child. She is of Czechoslovak descent.

== Career ==
Bair was scouted in a flea market in New York by an agent of The Society Management, the New York division of Elite, a notable American modeling agency. She said her first show (Proenza Schouler) got her confused, because she wasn't expecting to walk the runway just one week after being scouted. Molly Bair is now signed to The Society New York, Elite London, Elite Milan and Elite Paris.

She has appeared in editorials for Italian, British, and German Vogue, French Numéro, W, V, i-D and Dazed and Confused, and graced the covers of Vogue Japan, Numéro and German Interview.

Bair has walked the runway for Miu Miu, Fendi, Moschino, Prada, Vera Wang, Chanel, Alexander McQueen, Bottega Veneta, Gucci, Proenza Schouler, Balenciaga, Sonia Rykiel, DKNY, Michael Kors, Loewe, Alexander Wang, Marc Jacobs, Kenzo, Giles Deacon, Max Mara, DSquared2, Maison Margiela, Dries Van Noten, Dior, Tory Burch, and Diane Von Furstenberg.

She has appeared in advertising campaigns for Prada, Shiatzy Chen, Alexander Wang, Stella McCartney, Coach, Marc Jacobs, and Vera Wang.
