= Gerard W. Ford =

Co-founder of Ford Models

- Born: Gerard William Ford; October 2, 1924; New Orleans, Louisiana, U.S.
- Died: August 24, 2008 (aged 83); Morristown, New Jersey, U.S.
- Occupations: Agent (retired), war veteran
- Years active: 1946–1995
- Spouse: Eileen Otte (m. 1944)
- Children: 4, including Katie Ford
- Website: www.fordmodels.com

Gerard William "Jerry" Ford (October 2, 1924 – August 24, 2008) was an American businessman who in 1946 founded Ford Modeling Agency with his wife Eileen Ford in their apartment on the Upper East Side of Manhattan in New York City.

== Life ==
Ford was born October 2, 1924, in New Orleans, Louisiana. One of six children of John William and Ermine Ford, Ford graduated from Jesuit High School in New Orleans where he played football and became a boxer and football player at Notre Dame, where his roommate was Johnny Lujack, a Heisman Trophy winner. He transferred to midshipman school at Columbia University as part of his service with the United States Navy during World War II. His wife, then Eileen Otte, was studying at Barnard College and was, herself, briefly a model. The couple met and eloped in 1944 while Ford was waiting to ship out with the Navy.

== Career ==
In 1945, after completing his Naval service aboard a supply ship based in the Pacific Theater of Operations, Ford returned to his home and wife in New York. He resumed his studies in accounting at Columbia University, while Mrs. Ford worked as a secretary for several of her friends, also models, and eventually became their informal agent. When she became pregnant, she left active work and he stepped in to manage the business.

Prior to Ford's innovations, models generally handled their own bookings and billing individually. In the 1970s, Ford created the first contracts for models to represent specific brands exclusively, securing higher fees for the models. He negotiated the first such contract for Lauren Hutton to represent Revlon in 1974.

At the time of his death, he resided in Oldwick, New Jersey. He died in Morristown, New Jersey at the age of 83. The cause of his death was complications from endocarditis.

His daughter is Katie Ford.
