= Liliane Ferrarezi =

Brazilian model (born 1988)

- Born: 26 June 1988 (age 36); Belo Horizonte, Brazil
- Occupation: Model
- Years active: 2002–present
- Modeling information
- Height: 1.75 m (5 ft 9 in)
- Hair color: Brown
- Eye color: Green
- Agency: IMG Models (New York); Francina Models (Barcelona); Unique Models (Copenhagen); IMG Models (Paris)

Liliane Ferrarezi (born 26 June 1988) is a Brazilian model. In 2002, she was the winner out of 350,000 entrants competing in the Brazilian round of the Supermodel of the World contest. Representing Brazil in the 2002 world final, held in Punta Cana, Dominican Republic, she finished as the runner-up out of forty-five contestants.

Since then, she has modelled for designer labels including Balenciaga, Calvin Klein, and Marc Jacobs and been photographed for the campaigns of Burberry and Gap. Her magazine covers include French and Italian editions of Vogue. She also appeared in a television commercial for "Echo Women" by Davidoff.

Ferrarezi has worked for the agencies Beatrice of Milan, Ford Models of São Paulo, and Models 1 of London.
