= Tami Williams =

Jamaican fashion model (born 1998)

- Born: Shaekagale Shanicece Williams; August 16, 1998 (age 26); Kingston, Jamaica
- Modeling information
- Height: 1.80 m (5 ft 11 in)
- Hair color: Black
- Eye color: Brown
- Agency: The Society Management (New York); Elite Model Management (Paris); Why Not Model Management (Milan); Storm Management (London); Uno Models (Barcelona); Saint International Limited (Kingston)

Shaekagale Shanicece "Tami" Williams is a Jamaican-born high fashion model based in New York.

== Career ==
Williams was discovered at age 11. She was discovered by Deiwght Peters, CEO of Jamaican-based agency, Saint International Jamaica Limited. She has appeared in advertisements for Valentino, Dolce & Gabbana, Calvin Klein, Topshop, Balmain, and Gucci. She debuted as a semi-exclusive for Alexander Wang. She has walked the runway for Chanel, Marc Jacobs, Alberta Ferretti, Gucci, Valentino, Maison Margiela, Calvin Klein, Balmain, Lanvin, Emilio Pucci, Roberto Cavalli, Hermès, and Dolce & Gabbana.

Williams was once ranked as a "Top 50" model by models.com

== Personal life ==
Williams was born in St. Elizabeth, Jamaica and was raised by her mother, Carlene McLeod, a single mother who had five children. She originally attended Black River High and lived in Gazeland, St Elizabeth.
