= Ida Heiner =

Danish fashion model

- Born: 2004 (age 21–22); Copenhagen, Denmark
- Years active: 2020–present
- Modeling information
- Height: 5 ft 10 in (1.78 m)
- Hair color: Blonde
- Eye color: Blue
- Agency: Women Management (New York, Milan, Paris); Premier Model Management (London); Freedom Models (Los Angeles); Scoop Models (Copenhagen) (mother agency)

Ida Heiner (born 2004) is a Danish fashion model. She began her career with Louis Vuitton.

== Career ==
Heiner debuted as an exclusive for Louis Vuitton's S/S 2021 fashion show and opened the next season's F/W 2021 show. By the S/S 2023 season she had walked for Chanel, Alaïa, Fendi, and Schiaparelli. She has also walked for Tory Burch, Altuzarra, and Proenza Schouler, as well as working consistently with Chanel ever since Virginie Viard became the creative director.

In June 2023, Heiner appeared in a Vogue editorial set in Liguria, Italy, alongside models Nora Attal, Vittoria Ceretti, Paloma Elsesser, and Anok Yai.

Heiner appeared on the cover of the December 2023/January 2024 issue of Vogue France. Heiner is ranked as one of the "Top 50" models in the industry by models.com and was nominated for the "Model of the Year" award in 2023. Vogue chose Heiner as one of the top 11 models of the S/S 2023 season, noting her sharp cheekbones and her runway walk as some of her trademarks.

== Filmography ==
=== Music video appearances ===
Year	Song title	Artist	Ref.
2025	Gorgeous	Doja Cat	
