= Marie-Christine Gessinger =

Austrian fashion model

- Gessinger at the Ford 2008 Supermodel of the World contest, New York City
- Born: 30 November 1992; Lower Austria
- Died: 3 March 2010 (aged 17); Mistelbach, Austria

Marie-Christine Gessinger (30 November 1992 – 3 March 2010) was an Austrian fashion model active from late 2000s to early 2010s before dying in a traffic collision at the age of 17.

Born in Lower Austria, Gessinger began modeling after taking part in Ford's Supermodel of the World contest at the age of 15, winning the Vienna preliminary competition, and representing Austria at the New York finale.

She had been scheduled to work for Versace among others, but on the evening of 3 March 2010 she was killed in a car crash with her 19-year-old friend as the driver. She was 17 years old.

== See also ==
- List of people who died in road accidents
