= Camila Finn =

Brazilian model (born 1991)

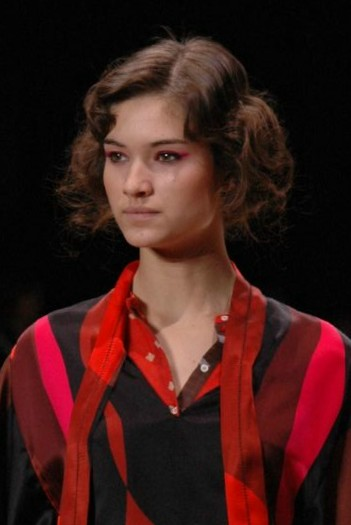
- Finn at the Paul Smith Women Fall 2007 show
- Born: Camila Caroline Finn; November 6, 1991 (age 34); Botucatu, São Paulo, Brazil
- Occupation: Model
- Years active: 2002–present
- Modeling information
- Height: 5 ft 9 in (1.75 m)
- Hair color: Brown
- Eye color: Brown
- Agency: IMG Models (New York); Women Management (Milan)

Camila Caroline Finn (born November 6, 1991) is a Brazilian model. She who won the Ford "Supermodel of the Year" award at the age of 14.

== Biography ==
Finn became the first Brazilian to win the Ford Models "Supermodel of the World" contest, which took place on the night of January 8, 2005, in New York City. She was able to defeat 44 candidates from around the world. With the victory, the 13-year-old got a $250,000 annual contract with the American Ford Models agency.

By winning the Brazilian stage of the "Ford Supermodel" in November 2004, she had already won a contract of R$150 thousand.

She has been compared to model Gisele Bündchen, which she considers a "great compliment". She admires fellow Brazilian model Liliane Ferrarezi.

== Career ==
Finn was discovered in 2002 at the age of 9. She was approached by photographer and Ford Models representative Malu Ornelas in her hometown while shopping with her mother. She currently lives in New York City. She works with Ford Models in New York and Mega Model in Brazil. She worked with the greatest designers of all time, like Chanel, Balenciaga, Gucci, Calvin Klein, Jill Stuart, etc. She appeared in several magazines like Vogue, Glamour, Elle, Harper's Bazaar.

Since her win, she has disassociated herself from Ford Models, re-signing with IMG Models in New York City and Women Management in Milan.

She also contributed as actress on the music video "Labirinto", from the Brazilian rock band Skore.
