= Ulrikke Høyer =

Danish fashion model

- Born: Ulrikke Louise Lahn Høyer; Copenhagen, Denmark
- Modeling information
- Height: 1.78 m (5 ft 10 in)
- Hair color: Brown
- Eye color: Blue-green
- Agency: Oui Management (Paris); The Fabbrica (Milan); Select Model Management (London); A Management (Hamburg); Bon Image Corp. (Tokyo); 2pm Model Management (Copenhagen) (mother agency)

Ulrikke Louise Lahn Høyer is a Danish fashion model.

== Career ==
Before modeling, Høyer was a professional tennis player. She debuted as a Louis Vuitton exclusive in 2016. The next season Høyer walked in 27 shows for designers including Elie Saab (which she closed), Valentino, Atelier Versace, Dolce & Gabbana, Lanvin, Stella McCartney, Jason Wu, and Chloé. She has also walked for Kenzo, Joseph, Blumarine, Marchesa, and Oscar de la Renta.

Høyer has appeared in T Magazine, Vogue, Vogue Paris, and Interview among others. She has done a campaign for Chloé.

=== Size controversy ===
Høyer made international headlines when she alleged that she was fired from Louis Vuitton's 2018 cruise show in Kyoto, Japan, after casting director Ashley Brokaw's team instructed her to only drink water for 24 hours because she was "bloated" despite being a runway standard size 4. Brokaw denied the allegations as miscommunication.
