= Ondria Hardin =

American fashion model

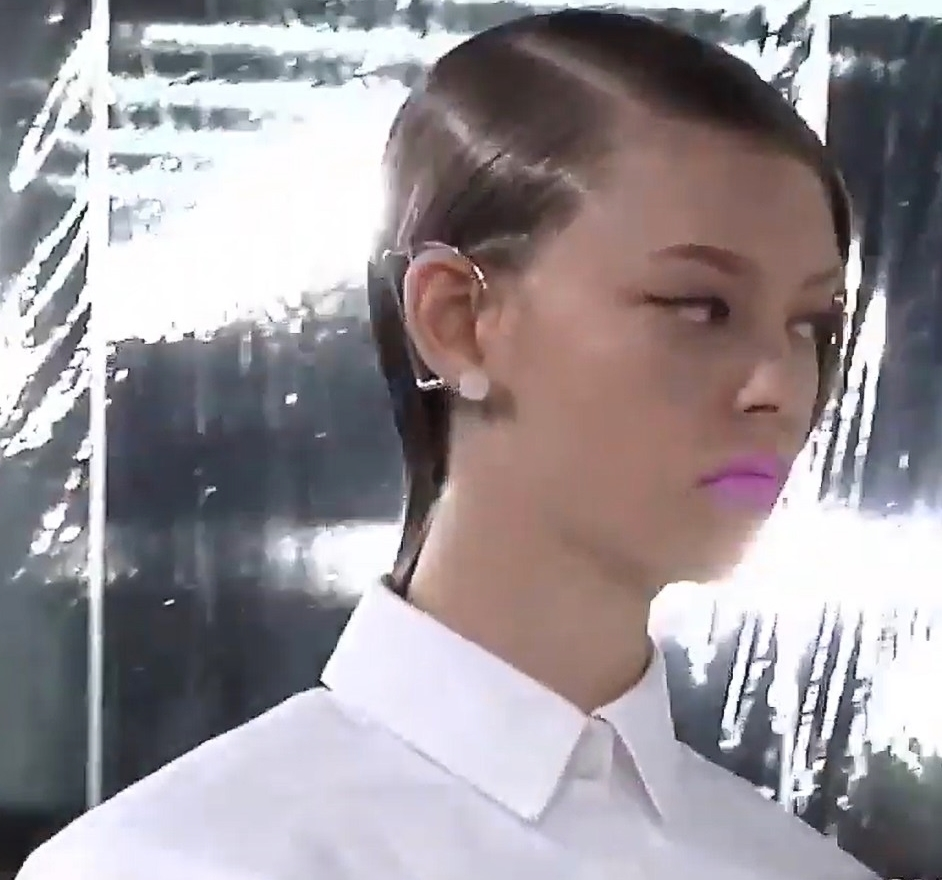
- Hardin walks for the Prabal Gurung Spring Summer 2014 fashion show in New York City
- Born: Ondria Nichole Hardin; North Carolina, U.S.
- Modeling information
- Height: 1.78 m (5 ft 10 in)
- Hair color: Dark blonde
- Eye color: Hazel
- Agency: Mother Agent (Doll Wright); Heroes Agency (NYC); VIVA Model Management (Paris, London, Barcelona); d’Management Group (Milan); Core Artist Management (Hamburg); W Agency Inc. (Seoul); Priscilla’s Model Management (Sydney); Dolls Model Management (Taipei)

Ondria Nichole Hardin is an American fashion model. Launching her career with a direct booking for Prada, she has graced the covers of Vogue, and walked for almost every major Fashion Designer; known to the Industry as “The Muse”. She is a personal muse for the likes of Tom Ford, the late Karl Lagerfeld, Michael Kors, and launched Marc Jacobs Daisy fragrance campaign.

== Career ==
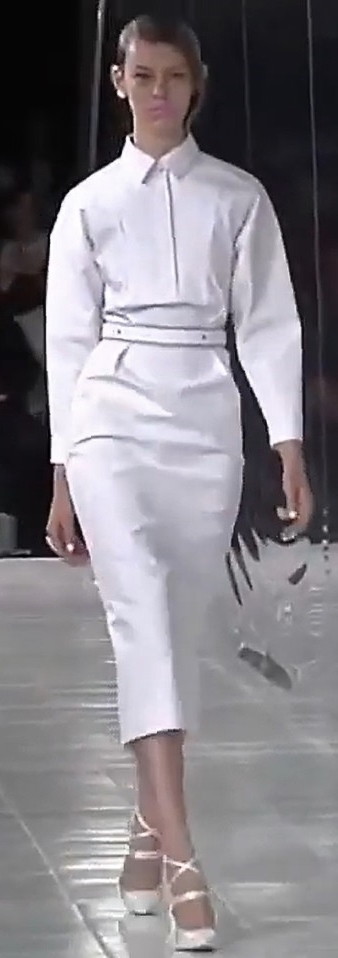
Hardin walks for the Prabal Gurung Spring Summer 2014 fashion show in New York City

Hardin was discovered in North Carolina and then placed to Mother Agency Priscilla’s Agency, & Mother Agent Doll Wright. She began her career in Tokyo, Japan. After being noticed by casting director Ashley Brokaw she was cast in a Prada campaign photographed by Steven Meisel.

Her first editorial was for Russh magazine. She has also appeared in magazines like Vogue, Vogue China, and Allure. Hardin has walked the runway for brands including Balenciaga, Dior, Michael Kors, Jil Sander, Dolce & Gabbana, Louis Vuitton, Tommy Hilfiger, Valentino, Dries van Noten, Bottega Veneta, and Alexander McQueen.

Hardin ranked on models.com's "Top 50" list.
