= Katie Ford (CEO) =

American executive (born 1955)

- Born: Mary Katherine Ford; 1955 (age 70–71); United States
- Known for: Former CEO of Ford Models
- Spouse: André Balazs (m. 1985; div. 2004)
- Children: 2
- Parent(s): Gerard W. Ford; Eileen Ford

Mary Katherine Ford (born 1955) is the former CEO of the modeling agency Ford Models, Inc. from 1995 until 2007.

== Life and career ==
Ford is the daughter of Eileen Ford (née Ottensoser) and Gerard William "Jerry" Ford, who started the agency in 1946. She holds a BA from Sarah Lawrence College and an MBA from Columbia University.

Ford worked for Strategic Planning Associates as a management consultant and TeleRep as a television sales representative.

Ford is active in the fight against human trafficking, and she is CEO of a nonprofit organization, Freedom For All.

In early March 2026, a release of files relating to sex trafficker Jeffrey Epstein indicated links between Katie Ford and her agency and the late sex trafficker, who died by suicide in a New York City jail cell on August 10, 2019. (see: Epstein files)

=== Ford Models ===
Ford joined her parents' company in 1980. She took over as head in 1995 and moved operations from the Upper East Side to SoHo. She also expanded the company's reach by setting up offices in 10 other cities, including Chicago, Cleveland, Paris, and in Brazil and Argentina.

Still one of the largest modeling agencies in the world, they represent more than 2,500 clients, but smaller boutique agencies have grown in popularity. In recent years, Ford has also have lost some of their most notable models, including Karen Elson, Maggie Rizer and Erin O'Connor, who were 'poached' by other agencies. Nonetheless, Ford's network of models include Sophie Dahl, Camilla Finn and Chanel Iman. Others Ford has represented include Kim Basinger, Adriana Lima, Mia Person, Rachel Hunter and Christie Brinkley.

In 2007, John Caplan became Ford Models' Chief Executive Officer, and she remained on the board of directors.

=== Family ===
Ford has a younger sister (Lacey), an older sister (Jamie) and an older brother (Bill).

Ford married hotelier André Balazs on November 16, 1985;
