= Vie (album) =

2025 album by Doja Cat

- Digital cover

Studio album by Doja Cat
- Released: September 26, 2025
- Studios: Electric Lady (New York City); Tamarind, Y2K, Conway, Sound Factory, Ponzu (Los Angeles); Pleasure Hill (Portland, Maine); Hutchinson Sound (Brooklyn); Hoxton Shoreditch (London); Oaxaca City (Mexico); Miraval Studios (Correns, France)
- Genres: Pop; hip-hop; R&B
- Length: 49:44
- Labels: Kemosabe; RCA
- Producers: Ambezza; Jack Antonoff; AoD; Baudee; Gavin Bennett; Rob Bisel; Benjamin Boukris; George Daniel; Fallen; Jeff "Gitty" Gitelman; Felix Joseph; Kaeyos; Kurtis McKenzie; Scribz Riley; Sounwave; Stavros; Finn Wigan; Y2K

Doja Cat chronology
Scarlet (2023)	Vie (2025)

Alternative cover
- Primary physical cover

Singles from Vie
- 1. "Jealous Type" Released: August 21, 2025; 2. "Gorgeous" Released: October 10, 2025

Vie (/viː/ VEE; French: [vi]; transl. Life) is the fifth studio album by the American rapper and singer Doja Cat, released on September 26, 2025, by Kemosabe and RCA Records. Containing a sole guest appearance from SZA, the album marks Doja Cat's return to pop music; it is a 1980s-inspired pop, hip-hop and R&B album with elements of funk-pop, pop-rap, dance-pop and disco music. Its themes include love, romance, and sex. It was recorded in a three-year period at Miraval Studios, based in Correns, France. The album's lead single, "Jealous Type", was released on August 21, 2025, followed by a music video the next day. The next single, "Gorgeous", and the track "Stranger" also received music videos.

Vie debuted at number 4 on the US Billboard 200, earning 57,000 album-equivalent units in its first week, including 26,000 pure album sales. The album received positive reviews from music critics, who lauded Doja's ambitious embrace of 1980s-inspired production, playful vocal agility, and her balance between pop and rap sensibilities.

== Background and development ==
In October 2024, Doja made a few posts on X (formerly Twitter) teasing a forthcoming album, such as "vvv" and "album", which led to fans thinking she was working on her fifth album. Also in October 2024, Doja Cat partnered with Airbnb's Icons program to stage an intimate "Living Room Session" in a West Hollywood bungalow, curated with her grandmother's paintings and a sit-down feast, where fifteen guests (US$77 each) were invited to hear an unplugged living-room set. Coverage and the official listing noted she would perform new songs alongside favorites, and Airbnb's post-event recap highlighted that she performed unreleased tracks from her upcoming fifth album during the private showcase.

On May 5, 2025, Doja Cat surprise-released "Crack", an outtake from her fourth album, Scarlet, exclusively on her website, which was only available to download for 24 hours. She later collaborated with the Marc Jacobs brand and previewed a snippet of the song "Jealous Type" in the advertisement of the campaign. She attended the Met Gala the same day, where she confirmed in an interview that the song will serve as a single from her upcoming album.

On July 21, 2025, Doja posted on X that the album had been completed. In an article for V, she announced a fall release date, and shared that the album would be more "pop-driven" than Scarlet. (Note: Attributed to multiple sources:) On August 14, she formally announced the album alongside a promotional video and shared that it would be released on September 26. Vie was recorded in a three-year period at Miraval Studios on Correns, France.

== Artwork ==
Doja Cat released the CD and vinyl cover art for Vie on August 20, 2025, depicting her face lying down surrounded by roses. As part of the album rollout, the rapper also unveiled a series of alternate covers that visually continued the '80s direction of the record. On September 22, Doja Cat unveiled the album's official cover art, showing herself in a tattered wedding dress, hanging from a yellow parachute caught in a tree, with the blue sky in the background. In the caption, she wrote "Falling in love is putting trust in the hands of yourself and others. The yellow parachute represents curiosity, happiness, and adventure. Flying you towards new experiences and scenes, taking a leap of faith, and holding no bounds. The tree represents life and wisdom. Giving you a sense of safety within its branches, but the pain from the fall teaches you that those scratches can be healed. You don’t have to hit the ground. Love grows upward but more importantly down. It’s the roots that keep you steady. This is the cover of my album." In response to fans' criticism, the rapper defended the new cover, calling it "perfect" and saying "You can’t make me feel bad for a cover that has visceral meaning. The greatest armor is love and integrity. I forgive your harsh criticism but for me I won yet again for following my heart."

== Release and promotion ==
The hot line's retro telephone aesthetic also tied into the broader '80s-inspired visual identity of the era, aligning with the Marc Jacobs fashion partnership, the floral-laden cover art reveal, and Doja’s platinum-blonde styling at Outside Lands. "Jealous Type" was released as the album's lead single on August 21, 2025, followed by a music video the next day. A music video for "Gorgeous" was released alongside the album. A music video for "Stranger" was released in late September.

=== Tour and live performances ===
Doja Cat headlined Outside Lands festival on August 8, 2025, performing several songs across her discography, as well as debuting the unreleased single "Jealous Type".

On August 21, 2025, Doja Cat announced her third concert tour, Tour Ma Vie World Tour, in support of the album, which will start on November 18, 2025, in Auckland and conclude on December 1, 2026, in New York City. Presale for the tour commenced on August 25, 2025.

== Music and lyrics ==
Vie is a pop, hip-hop, and R&B record. A return to her melodic roots, Vie consists primarily of synth-pop production and saxophone accompaniment, reminiscent of the typical 80s music soundscape.

Vie opens with "Cards," with saxophone improvisations, before transitioning to a New jack swing-style beat and developing into verses about "enticing a man on the dance floor," in which Doja croons and flirtatiously raps to a newfound lover. This follows into second track, "Jealous Type."

== Critical reception ==
Professional ratings
Aggregate scores
Source	Rating
AnyDecentMusic?	7.3/10
Metacritic	78/100
Review scores
Source	Rating
AllMusic	4/5 stars
Beats Per Minute	74%
Clash	8/10
Consequence	B
The Guardian	4/5 stars
NME	4/5 stars
Pitchfork	6.8/10
PopMatters	8/10
Rolling Stone	3.5/5 stars
Slant Magazine	3/5 stars

According to the review aggregator Metacritic, Vie received "generally favorable reviews" based on a weighted average score of 78 out of 100 from 12 critic scores. It is currently her highest rated album on the site. The review aggregator site AnyDecentMusic? compiled 10 reviews and gave the album an average of 7.3 out of 10, based on their assessment of the critical consensus.

Shanté Collier-McDermott of Clash gave a positive review for the album, and wrote, "Overall Vie is a lot of things but overarchingly is Doja Cat's 90s baby ode to 80s music. It draws from a spice rack of R&B, pop, funk, new jack swing, hip-hop and the list goes on. Sprinkling them as elements to give each part its own flavour. Content wise she cleverly displays the intricacies of love however it's not too dissimilar from the story-telling we have previously got. Nonetheless Doja's ability to effortlessly slide in and out of different pockets – and at a high level is indication of her sheer starpower. The visual assets that accompany this project fittingly cement the theme and even if this album isn't to your taste, her talent is undeniable." Rolling Stone's Rob Sheffield gave the album 3.5 stars rating out of 5 and wrote, "Most of the songs work the same formula—featherweight pop tunes with brief rap interludes—so they tend to blend together even when they're quality filler." Variety's Steven J. Horowitz wrote that Vie is "a record that reinforces that Doja doesn't need to fit into one box to become the artist she's meant to be", while further stating, "It's a notion that she herself seems to have come to terms with, however trying (or public) it may have been, and Vie is all the better for it."

Slant Magazine's Sal Cinquemani gave a more mixed review and wrote, "Outside of Doja's rap verses, Vie feels less like a contemporary album in conversation with the past—like, say, Gwen Stefani's Love. Angel. Music. Baby.—and more like a straightforward exercise in pastiche. The rapper-singer's willingness to step outside of her comfort zone means we get to luxuriate in the nostalgia of tracks like 'Come Back' which evokes those dreamy Nestlé white chocolate commercials from the '80s. But the album as a whole is probably too lightweight (and repetitive) to make a lasting impression."

== Commercial performance ==
Vie debuted at number 4 on the US Billboard 200, earning 57,000 album-equivalent units in its first week—comprising 26,000 in pure album sales. This marked Doja's fourth Top 10 album on the Billboard 200. Despite the album's equal chart debut in comparison to Scarlet and positive reactions from critics, its singles have received fewer streams in comparison to her other albums.

Outside of the US, Vie debuted at number 6 on the ARIA Top 50 Albums chart in Australia, becoming Doja's third consecutive Top 10 album in the country. It also reached number 1 on the ARIA Hip Hop/R&B Albums chart. In New Zealand, the album peaked at number 4 on the Official New Zealand Albums Chart, marking a strong performance in the region. Across Europe, Vie charted moderately, reaching number 16 in Austria and number 48 in Italy but had better numbers in Scotland, Belgium and Portugal, where the album respectively debuted number 4, number 7 and number 8. It also debuted in the top twenty in the Netherlands, France and Poland, respectively at number 11, number 14 and number 15. The album also entered the Japanese Download Albums chart at number 82, reflecting modest digital sales.

== Track listing ==
All lyrics are written by Amala Zandile Dlamini.

Vie track listing
No.	Title	Writer(s)	Producer(s)	Length
1.	"Cards"	Amala Dlamini; Jack Antonoff; Ari Starace; Gavin Bennett	Antonoff; Y2K; Bennett	3:43
2.	"Jealous Type"	Dlamini; Antonoff; Starace	Antonoff; Y2K	2:43
3.	"Aaahh Men!"	Dlamini; Antonoff; Stuart Phillips; Glen Albert Larson	Antonoff	3:13
4.	"Couples Therapy"	Dlamini; Antonoff; Benjamin Boukris	Antonoff; Boukris	2:41
5.	"Gorgeous"	Dlamini; Antonoff; George Daniel; Mark Spears; Kurtis McKenzie; Lee Stashenko; Stavros Tsarouhas	Antonoff; Daniel; Sounwave; McKenzie; Fallen; Stavros	4:26
6.	"Stranger"	Dlamini; Antonoff; Spears; McKenzie; Stashenko; Tsarouhas	Antonoff; Sounwave; McKenzie; Fallen; Stavros	3:21
7.	"All Mine"	Dlamini; McKenzie; Scribz Riley; Jeff "Gitty" Gitelman; Kevin Theodore	McKenzie; Riley; Gitelman; Theodore^{[a]}	3:22
8.	"Take Me Dancing" (featuring SZA)	Dlamini; Solána Rowe; Antonoff; Starace; Bennett; McKenzie; Joe Caleb; Riley	Antonoff; Y2K; Bennett	3:44
9.	"Lipstain"	Dlamini; McKenzie; Felix Joseph; Antonoff; Alastair O'Donnell; Finn Wigan; J. C. Crowley; Sam Dees; Dennis Lambert	Antonoff; McKenzie; Joseph; AoD; Wigan	3:23
10.	"Silly! Fun!"	Dlamini; Rob Bisel	Bisel	2:32
11.	"Acts of Service"	Dlamini; McKenzie; Stashenko; Tsarouhas	McKenzie; Fallen; Stavros	3:31
12.	"Make It Up"	Dlamini; Starace; Bennett	Y2K; Bennett	3:10
13.	"One More Time"	Dlamini; McKenzie; Riley; Jonathan Enyioko-Bakers; Leonard Latouche; Filipe Mora	McKenzie; Riley; Kaeyos; Baudee	3:26
14.	"Happy"	Dlamini; McKenzie; Mathias Liyew; Riley	McKenzie; Ambezza; Riley	3:24
15.	"Come Back"	Dlamini; Antonoff; Giuseppe Donaggio	Antonoff	3:05
Total length:				49:44

=== Notes ===
- ^{^[a]} signifies an additional producer
- "Aaahh Men!" contains a sample of Knight Rider theme song (which in turn was further inspired from "Cortège de Bacchus" by Léo Delibes in his ballets Coppélia (1870) and Sylvia (1876)), written by Stuart Phillips and Glen Albert Larson, and performed by Phillips.
- The intro to "All Mine" samples a scene from the 1984 film Conan the Destroyer, featuring the characters Zula (played by Grace Jones) and Princess Jehnna (played by Olivia d'Abo) discussing how one goes about attracting a man.
- "Take Me Dancing" does not feature SZA on standard physical editions.
- "Lipstain" contains a sample of "(You're My) Aphrodisiac", written by J. C. Crowley, Sam Dees and Dennis Lambert, and performed by Dennis Edwards.
- "Come Back" contains a sample of "Telescope" from the film Body Double, written and performed by Pino Donaggio.

== Personnel ==
Credits were adapted from Tidal.

=== Musicians ===
- Doja Cat – vocals (all tracks), background vocals (tracks 1–6, 8, 9, 11, 13–15), percussion (1)
- Jack Antonoff – programming (1–6, 8, 9, 14, 15); percussion, synthesizer (1–5, 8, 9, 14, 15); electric guitar (1, 2, 4, 6, 8, 9, 15), acoustic guitar (1, 4, 8, 9, 14), background vocals (1, 2, 9), bass (1, 3, 6, 8, 9), bass synthesizer (2, 8), drums (3, 6, 14, 15), Wurlitzer piano (4), vocoder (5, 14), Rhodes piano (5); piano, sitar (14)
- Evan Smith – saxophone (1, 2, 5, 6, 9, 15), flute (4, 11)
- Zem Audu – saxophone (1, 2, 5, 6, 9, 11, 15)
- Ari Starace – programming (1, 2, 8, 12), percussion (1, 2, 8), keyboards (1, 2, 12), bass (2, 8, 12), guitar (2), acoustic guitar (12)
- Gavin Bennett – bass (1, 8, 12), guitar (1), programming (8, 12); percussion, synthesizer (8); keyboards (12)
- Gordon Dillard – background vocals (3)
- Jamal Moore – background vocals (3)
- Benjamin Boukris – percussion, programming, synthesizer (4)
- Bobby Hawk – violin (5, 11), strings (14)
- George Daniel – clavinet, keyboards, piano, programming (5)
- Sounwave – bass synthesizer, programming (5)
- Stavros – programming (5), synthesizer (11)
- Fallen – programming (5)
- Deborah Sawyer (Note: Credited as "Doja Cat's Mom") – vocals (5)
- Jack Manning – programming (6)
- Sean Hutchinson – keyboards, programming (8)
- SZA – vocals (8)
- Kurtis McKenzie – synthesizer (9, 11, 14), programming (9, 13, 14), bass (9); electric guitar, percussion, vocoder (13)
- Aod – bass, programming, synthesizer (9)
- Felix Joseph – bass, programming, synthesizer (9)
- Finn Wigan – bass, programming, synthesizer (9)
- Michael Riddleberger – percussion (9)
- Rob Bisel – bass, guitar, programming, synthesizer (10)
- Sam Dew – background vocals (12)
- Scribz Riley – programming (13, 14); electric guitar, percussion, vocoder (13); synthesizer (14)
- Kaeyos – electric guitar, percussion, programming, vocoder (13)
- Budee – electric guitar, percussion, programming, vocoder (13)
- Ambezza – programming, synthesizer (14)

=== Technical ===
- Neal H Pogue – mixing (1, 4, 5, 7, 11, 12, 14)
- Serban Ghenea – mixing (2, 6, 10)
- Oli Jacobs – mixing (3, 8, 9, 13, 15), engineering (1–6, 8, 9, 11–15)
- Ruairi O'Flaherty – mastering
- Ari Starace – engineering (1, 2, 12)
- Evan Smith – engineering (1, 4)
- Jack Antonoff – engineering (1–6, 8, 9, 11–15)
- Laura Sisk – engineering (1–6, 8, 9, 11–15)
- Bryce Bordone – engineering (2, 6, 10)
- Rian Lewis – engineering (3, 10)
- George Daniel – engineering (5)
- Jack Manning – engineering (6, 13), engineering assistance (1–3, 5, 8, 9, 12, 14, 15)
- Sean Hutchinson – engineering (8)
- Dylan Neustadter – engineering (10)
- Rob Bisel – engineering (10)
- Jozef Caldwell – engineering (14), engineering assistance (1–3, 5, 6, 8, 9, 12, 13, 15)
- Joseph Miller – engineering assistance (1–3, 5, 6, 8, 9, 12–14, 15)
- Jon Sher – engineering assistance (3)
- Kellie McGrew – engineering assistance (5, 9, 13)
- Dani Perez – engineering assistance (6)
- Maisy Preece – engineering assistance (8)

== Charts ==
Chart performance for Vie
Chart (2025)	Peak position
Australian Albums (ARIA)	6
Australian Hip Hop/R&B Albums (ARIA)	1
Austrian Albums (Ö3 Austria)	16
Belgian Albums (Ultratop Flanders)	14
Belgian Albums (Ultratop Wallonia)	7
Canadian Albums (Billboard)	8
Croatian International Albums (HDU)	37
Czech Albums (ČNS IFPI)	67
Dutch Albums (Album Top 100)	11
French Albums (SNEP)	14
German Albums (Offizielle Top 100)	13
German Pop Albums (Offizielle Top 100)	3
Hungarian Albums (MAHASZ)	31
Irish Albums (Official Charts)	15
Italian Albums (FIMI)	48
Japanese Download Albums (Billboard Japan)	82
Lithuanian Albums (AGATA)	22
New Zealand Albums (RMNZ)	4
Norwegian Albums (IFPI Norge)	41
Polish Albums (ZPAV)	15
Portuguese Albums (AFP)	8
Scottish Albums (Official Charts)	4
Slovak Albums (ČNS IFPI)	48
Spanish Albums (PROMUSICAE)	48
Swedish Albums (Sverigetopplistan)	37
Swiss Albums (Schweizer Hitparade)	11
UK Albums (Official Charts)	5
US Billboard 200	4

== Release history ==
Vie release history
Region	Date	Format	Label	Ref.
Various	September 26, 2025	Cassette; CD; digital download; streaming; vinyl	Kemosabe; RCA	

== Use in other media ==
The song "Aaahh Men!" was featured in the teaser of the Aditya Dhar's Hindi spy action-thriller duology Dhurandhar (2025) Dhurandhar: The Revenge (2026). The song also appears in the film.
