= Eileen Ford =

American model agency executive (1922–2014)

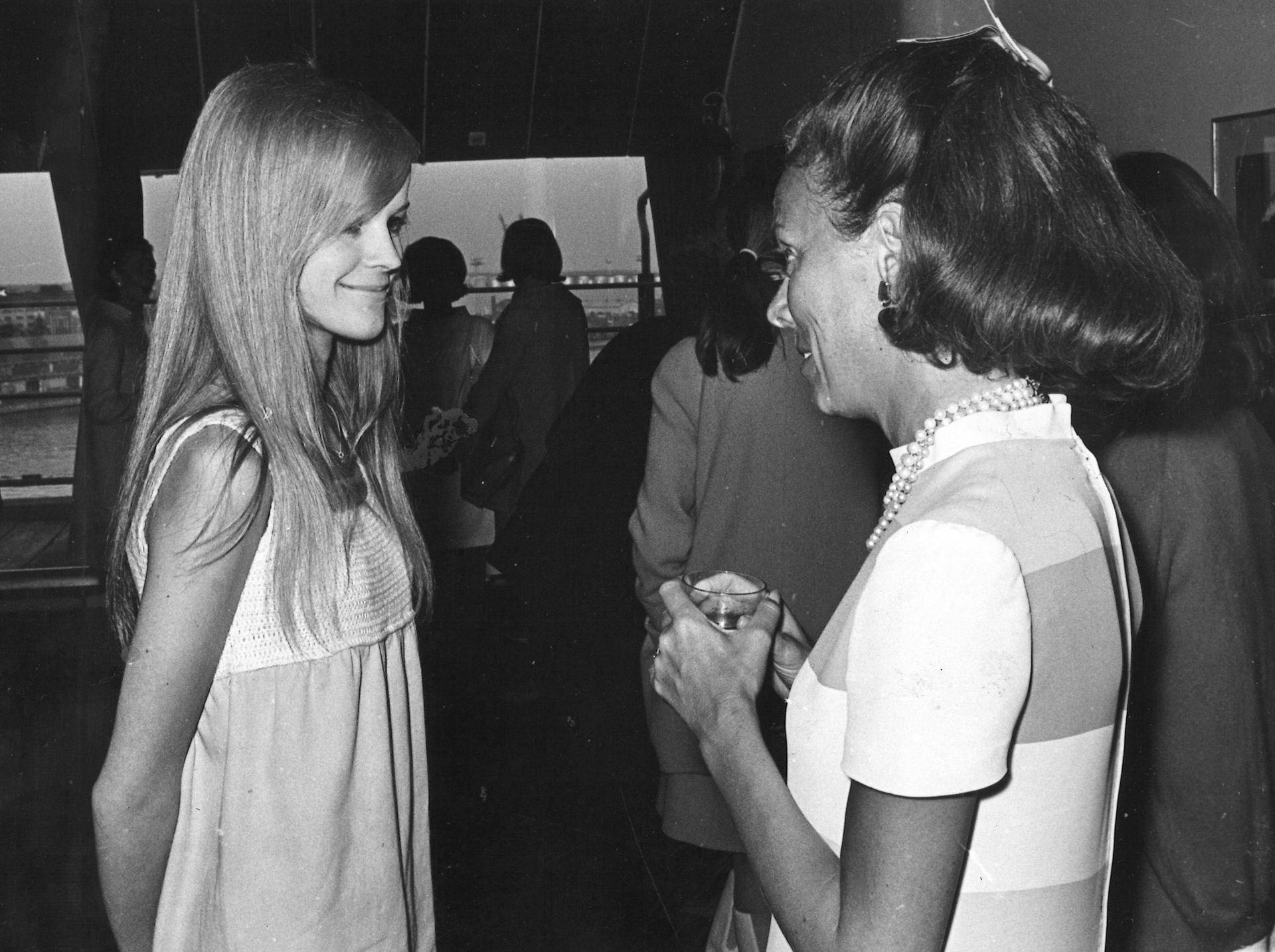
- Ford (right) with a model in Finland in 1967
- Born: Eileen Cecile Otte; March 25, 1922; New York City, U.S.
- Died: July 9, 2014 (aged 92); Morristown, New Jersey, U.S.
- Occupations: Model agency executive and co-founder of Ford Models
- Years active: 1946–1995
- Spouse: Gerard W. Ford (m. 1944; died 2008)
- Children: 4, including Katie Ford
- Website: www.fordmodels.com

Eileen Cecile Ford (née Otte; March 25, 1922 – July 9, 2014) was an American modeling agency executive. Along with her husband Gerard "Jerry" Ford, she co-founded Ford Models in 1946, which emerged as one of the earliest and most successful modeling agencies in the mid and late-20th century.

== Early life and education ==
Eileen Cecile Ottensoser was born in Manhattan, New York City, and raised in suburban Great Neck on Long Island, the only daughter of four children of Loretta Marie (née Laine) and Nathaniel Ottensoser. Nathaniel was an "upmarket Jewish debt collector". Eileen took great pains to hide her Jewish heritage and would keep it a secret from her own children.

She attended Barnard College, where she was a model during the summers of her freshman and sophomore years for Harry Conover's modeling agency, one of the first in the United States. She graduated from Barnard in 1943. She changed her last name to Otte and adopted a WASP identity to avoid the Jewish Quota. She had a short-lived marriage with a naval officer, however, marriage ended when he was killed in 1944.

Then, in 1944, she met her future husband, Gerard "Jerry" Ford, at a drugstore near Columbia University. They eloped, marrying in November 1944 in San Francisco. Shortly thereafter, Jerry, who was in the U.S. Navy, was deployed during World War II.

== Career ==
With her husband Jerry deployed, Ford began her career as a secretary to photographer Elliot Clark, and then as a fashion stylist, copywriter, and fashion reporter for The Tobe Report. A pregnant Eileen then began working as a secretary for several models, taking calls at her father's New York City law office, and charging each model $65 to $75 monthly for administrative support. In March 1947, she gave birth to their first child, a daughter, Jamie.

=== Ford Models ===
In March 1946, her husband returned from his deployment, and he joined Eileen in creating a modeling agency. After only a year, Eileen and Jerry sold their car and relocated their agency to a third-floor walkup office on Second Avenue in Manhattan.

Within a year, the modeling agency emerged as one of the most successful agencies in the nation, grossing $250,000. The Fords' first superstar model was Jean Patchett. The Fords had the capital to instill the voucher system, something that other modeling agencies were not affluent enough to offer. Dorian Leigh described Eileen as "one of the hardest working, most persistent persons I have ever known, two qualities which made her my very good friend for years and later, my unanticipated enemy".

After two years, the Fords were competing seriously with the modeling industry's two leading agencies, those of Huntington Hartford and John Robert Powers. Leigh closed her modeling agency when she was pregnant with her third child in 1948. Leigh called Eileen and told them that her 15-years younger sister, Suzy Parker, was making only $25 per hour working as a model for Huntington Hartford. Leigh felt Suzy, although only 16 years old, should be making $40 per hour, and told Ford she would join her two-year-old agency only if they took Parker sight-unseen. Anxious to represent Leigh, they agreed. Expecting a younger version of the raven-haired, blue-eyed, very slender, 5'4" Dorian, the Fords were shocked to see Parker was 5'10" with green eyes, and freckles.

They soon realized, however, that Parker had the possibility of becoming quite a successful model. Soon thereafter, Parker would become the most successful model of the 1950s, helping push the Ford's agency to number one.

In the 1940s and 1950s, the Fords represented top models Mary Jane Russell, Carmen Dell'Orefice, and Dovima.

By 1954, the Fords were extremely successful and were living in a duplex apartment on Park Avenue. To make sure that their models were the most successful, the Fords provided hair dressers, dermatologists, and Eileen dispensed diet advice constantly. She allowed models to live with her to "keep a close eye on them so they'd stay out of trouble and make their early morning appointments". Eleven of Ford's busiest models were featured on the April 1955 issue of McCall's magazine, Parker, Leigh, Jean Patchett, Patsy Shally, Lillian Marcuson, Nan Rees, Leonie Vernet, Georgia Hamilton, Dolores Hawkins, Kathy Dennis, and Mary Jane Russell. Ford pushed for standardized hours and wages. She enforced rules about what models could and could not do, such as revealing "excessive amounts of bosom".

The Fords' marriage became tense. Jerry told Eileen to "mend (your) ways or we'll be divorced!" She told author Michael Gross in a 1990s interview, "...so I mended my ways. That's why I'm so docile now." By the late 1950s, Eileen had given birth to four children: Jamie, Billy, Katie, and Lacey.

In 1957, Leigh, aged 40 and retired from modeling, was living in France. She decided to start another modeling agency, this time in France. The police and courts insisted she was running an illegal employment agency, and she was fined. After World War II, employment agencies were declared illegal. Leigh contacted the Fords about starting a legitimate modeling agency, the first of its kind in that country. She continued to run a successful agency, but in 1959 was charged in court again. After hiring a lawyer, she finally won her case. The Fords agreed to expand their modeling business into Europe, and Leigh would represent them in France as well as scout for potential models all over Europe. Leigh was so successful that she opened branches in London and Hamburg, Germany. She would trade her European models for Ford's American models and vice versa.

In the early 1960s, Ford represented then-model Martha Stewart, who like Eileen, went to Barnard College. Stewart modeled briefly in her late teens and early 20s, including for Chanel.

Their top models in the 1960s included Wilhelmina Cooper (who would go on to run a successful modeling agency of her own in the 1970s, until her death from lung cancer due to heavy smoking in 1980, at age 40), Jean Shrimpton, Ann Turkel, Agneta Frieberg, Ali MacGraw, Candice Bergen, Tilly Tizani, Sondra Peterson, and Donna Michelle. In 1968, Ford produced Eileen Ford's Book of Model Beauty, which gave beauty tips and nutrition and exercise advice. The book included a biography and photos of Ford's most successful models from the 1950s and 1960s.

In the 1970s, Stewart catered parties and weddings with Dorian Leigh, who became a cordon bleu level chef after retiring from the fashion industry. On the twentieth anniversary of the Ford Agency in 1966, Jerry Ford told The New York Times that they were billing $100,000 per week and that they were the first modeling agency to have a computer system. They had 175 female and 75 male models that booked 70% of modeling jobs in New York City and 30% worldwide.

In the early 1970s, Ford was still the number-one modeling agency in the world. It represented Jerry Hall, Christie Brinkley, Rene Russo, Kim Basinger, Janice Dickinson, Lauren Hutton, Karen Graham, Susan Blakely, and others. Hutton and Graham were the earliest models to get exclusive make-up contracts with Revlon and Estée Lauder. By 1977 however, John Casablancas, who started Elite, began to poach Ford's top models and her top booking agent, Monique Pillard. The Fords tried to sue Casablancas, and hired famed attorney Roy Cohn. They also competed with several smaller modeling agencies, such as Wilhelmina, which represented such late 1970s models as Gia Carangi, Patti Hansen and Shaun Casey.

During this time, Ford Models expanded their agency. A successful Men's Division would dominate the pages of GQ magazine. In 1975, the Fords started a children's division. In her Lifetime Intimate Portrait, Ford said they started that division with the aspiration of representing Brooke Shields, then nine-years-old. Shields was already an established model when the Fords signed her. She shot her first national advertising campaign with Francesco Scavullo in 1966 for Ivory soap. During Shields' first year with Ford, she shot photos with photographer Garry Gross. According to court records, Shields was paid $450 for the photo session.

By the late 1970s, competition between Elite and Ford had escalated with top models going back-and-forth between Elite, Ford, and smaller agencies, such as Zoli, which represented Rachel Ward and Esmé Marshall. Many top models at the time were harming their reputations with drug use, staying out all night at Studio 54, and not being sufficiently professional.

By the late 1970s and early 1980s, Eileen said several of Ford's models from the 1950s and 1960s died from smoking and breast cancer. Some 1970s models died from drug use, including Gia Carangi, who died of AIDS in 1986. Top fashion photographers, tired of these models' behavior, refused to work with them any longer.

In 1981, the Fords began an international modeling competition called "Face of the 80s", later known as Ford Models Supermodel of the World. With a few years, by the mid-1980s, drug-addicted blonde models were out, and more professional, brunette-haired models such as Cindy Crawford, Renée Simonsen, Carol Alt, Linda Evangelista, and Christy Turlington arrived. As a result, modeling fees rapidly accelerated and several models were making millions of dollars per year. Fashion editor Polly Mellen said, "The girls are getting rich, so rich." Turlington, at the age of 16, moved into Ford's townhouse during the summer of 1985, and would rapidly become one of the Ford's biggest successes ever.

In 1993, Eileen said that her agency received 10,000 letters per year and 7,000 personal visits to her office. Of these, she said, maybe only four or five are "really good ones [models]".

The same year, in 1993, the Ford's home in Tewksbury Township, New Jersey, was almost completely destroyed by fire. Later that year, they rebuilt an exact replica of the house.

== Retirement ==
In 1995, Katie Ford took over her parents' agency after their retirement. The 50th anniversary of the agency was highlighted in several publications, including the July–August 1996 issue of American Photo magazine and in January–February 1997's Top Model magazine, whose heading was "Ford at 50!". Katie Ford was chief executive officer for 12 years, from 1995 to 2007.

Ford's story has been told in Good Housekeeping in 1968, Life in November 1970 and Ladies' Home Journal in 1971 among many others. She appeared in the 1997 film Scratch the Surface about a teen model turned documentary cinematographer, Tara Fitzpatrick's examination of the clothing industry and in Intimate Portrait: Eileen Ford in 1999 and again in Celebrity Profile: Brooke Shields in 2001 and a profile of Christie Brinkley.

== Personal life ==
Ford's husband, Jerry Ford, died on August 24, 2008, aged 83. He was survived by his wife, four children, eight grandchildren, and two great-grandchildren.

== Death ==
Ford died at a hospital in Morristown, New Jersey, from complications of meningioma and osteoporosis, on July 9, 2014. She was 92 years old.

== Publications ==
- Eileen Ford's Book of Model Beauty by Eileen Ford. Trident Press: New York, (1968)
- Eileen Ford's a more beautiful you in 21 days, Simon and Schuster: New York (1972); ISBN 978-0-671-21191-2

== Sources ==
- Good Housekeeping magazine, 1968.
- Lacey, Robert. Model Woman: Eileen Ford and the Business of Beauty. New York: HarperCollins, 2015. ISBN 978-0-06-210807-4
