= Gorgeous (Doja Cat song) =

2025 single by Doja Cat

Single by Doja Cat

from the album Vie
- Released: October 10, 2025
- Genre: Funk-pop; R&B
- Length: 4:26
- Label: Kemosabe; RCA
- Songwriters: Amala Dlamini; Jack Antonoff; Mark Spears; Kurtis McKenzie; Lee Stashenko; Stavros Tsarouhas
- Producers: Jack Antonoff; Sounwave; George Daniel; Kurtis McKenzie; Fallen; Stavros Tsarouhas

Doja Cat singles chronology
"Jealous Type" (2025)	"Gorgeous" (2025)	"Go Girl" (2026)

Music video
- "Gorgeous" on YouTube

"Gorgeous" is a song by American singer Doja Cat from her fifth album Vie. Originally released as a track from the album by Kemosabe and RCA Records, it was sent to Italian radio airplay through Sony Italy on October 10, 2025, as the album's second single.

== Composition ==
"Gorgeous" features production that draws from 1980s aesthetics. The voice note at the beginning of the song was recorded by Doja's mother Deborah Sawyer.

== Critical reception ==
"Gorgeous" received generally positive reviews from critics, who have praised its empowering message, production, and visual presentation. Billboard ranked "Gorgeous" as the third-best song on the album, stating that its moody, kaleidoscopic beat and Doja's confident performance made it a joyful standout that radiates charisma from start to finish. Kyann-Sian Williams of NME praised the track, describing it as "groove, sensuality and clever playfulness reach[ing] full force," and noting that it exudes "debonair confidence." The review suggests that "Gorgeous" demonstrates Doja's vocal dexterity and ability to blend genres seamlessly.

== Music video ==
The music video for Gorgeous was directed by Bardia Zeinali and shot in New York City. Conceptually, the video is heavily inspired by 1980s beauty commercials and cosmetics ads. It features Doja styled as if in a glam beauty campaign, complete with close-ups, product-like shots, and nostalgic typography. The video includes a high-fashion cast of models and icons. Cameos include Irina Shayk, Alex Consani, Paloma Elsesser, Yseult, Amelia Gray, Imaan Hammam, Ugbad, Alek Wek, Ida Heiner, Mona Tougaard, Karen Elson, Sora Choi, among others including Sawyer. The video opens in a mock commercial environment for a fictional cosmetics brand called "Gorgeous".

== Charts ==
=== Weekly charts ===
Weekly chart performance
Chart (2025–2026)	Peak position
Argentina Anglo Airplay (Monitor Latino)	9
Australia (ARIA)	78
Canada Hot 100 (Billboard)	73
Colombia Anglo Airplay (Monitor Latino)	13
Costa Rica Anglo Airplay (Monitor Latino)	11
Estonia Airplay (TopHit)	75
Global 200 (Billboard)	88
Guatemala Anglo Airplay (Monitor Latino)	11
Ireland (IRMA)	65
Japan Hot Overseas (Billboard Japan)	15
Lithuania Airplay (TopHit)	31
New Zealand Hot Singles (RMNZ)	6
UK Singles (OCC)	34
US Billboard Hot 100	56
US Pop Airplay (Billboard)	27
US Rhythmic Airplay (Billboard)	35

=== Monthly charts ===
Monthly chart performance
Chart (2025)	Peak position
Estonia Airplay (TopHit)	92
Lithuania Airplay (TopHit)	60

== Release history ==
Release dates and formats for "Gorgeous"
Region	Date	Format(s)	Label(s)	Ref.
Italy	October 10, 2025	Radio airplay	Sony Italy	
United States	January 27, 2026	Contemporary hit radio	Kemosabe; RCA	
