= Alex Binaris =

South African model

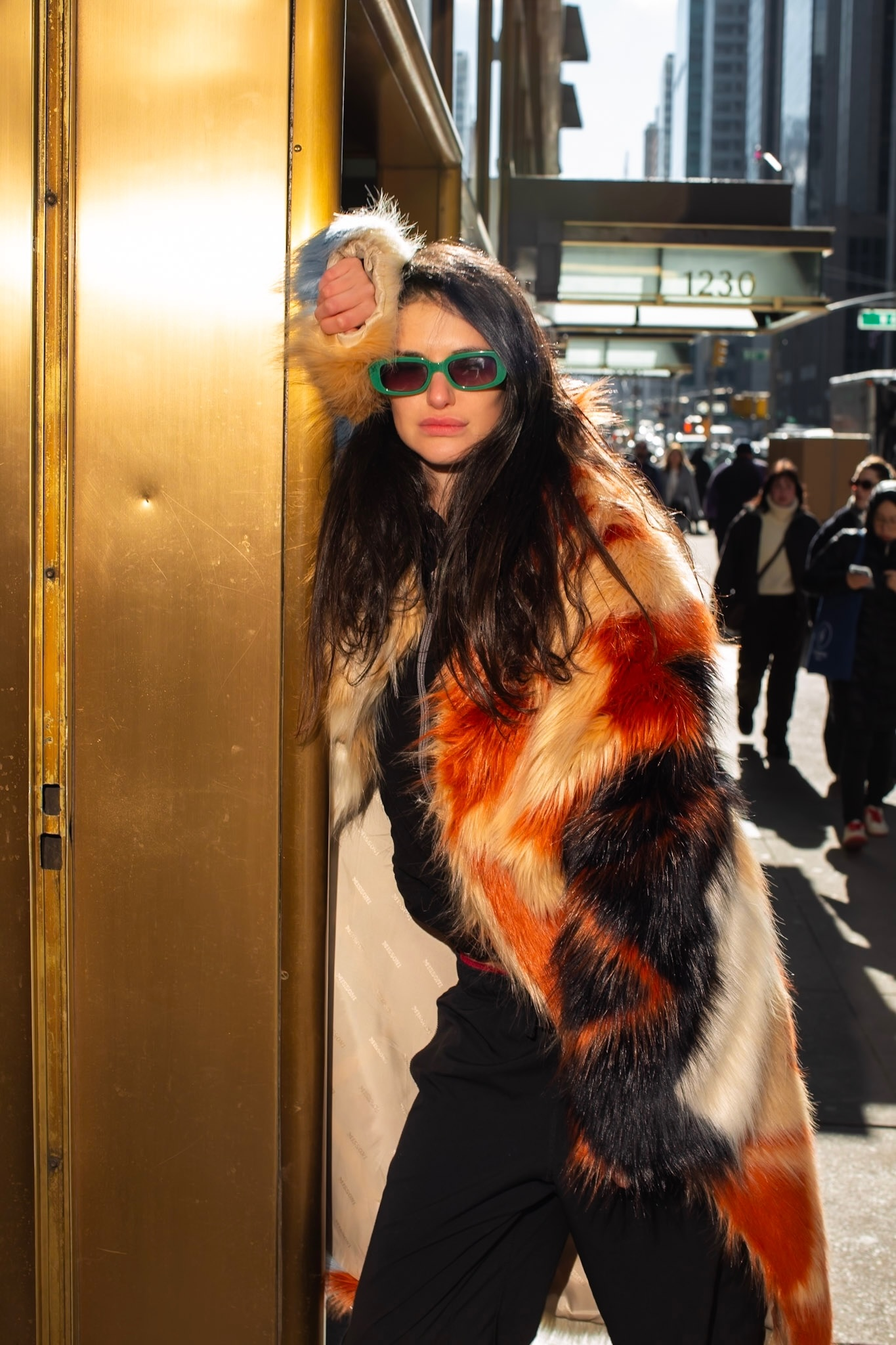
- Alex Binaris outside Pamella Roland fw25 Show during New York Fashion Week
- Born: Alexandra Binaris; Johannesburg, South Africa
- Occupation: Model
- Modelling information
- Height: 1.78 m (5 ft 10 in)
- Hair colour: Brown
- Eye colour: Green/ Blue
- Agency: Ford Models (Paris)(New York)(Los Angeles); Elite Model Management (Milan)

Alexandra Binaris is a South African fashion model.

== Early life ==
Alex Binaris is of Greek, Spanish, Portuguese, German, and French descent. She grew up in South Africa. Before pursuing a professional modeling career, she completed a triple major and later earned a postgraduate degree at the University of Cape Town on the Dean's Merit List.

== Career ==
On a hunch, Binaris went to the Boss Models agency in Cape Town, and was signed immediately. That same day, an Elite Model Management scout who happened to be present at the time signed her to Elite worldwide and The Society New York. She debuted as a Louis Vuitton Worldwide Exclusive.

She has walked for Miu Miu, Hermes and Chanel, has appeared on the pages of Haper's Bazaar USA, Vogue Japan and Vogue Arabia, on the cover of Harpers Bazaar Romania, Harpers Bazaar Khastakstan and Interview Magazine and has shot campaigns for Bulgari, Armani and Net-a-Porter.

Binaris is one of the highest paid models from South Africa.
