= Amalie and Cecilie Moosgaard =

Danish twin fashion models

- Born: Ikast, Denmark
- Modeling information
- Hair color: Light brown
- Eye color: Blue-green
- Agency: SILENT Models (New York); Women Management (Milan); The Hive Management (London); Le Management (Copenhagen, Stockholm, Hamburg) (mother agency)

Amalie Moosgaard and Cecilie Moosgaard are Danish twin fashion models.

== Careers ==
The Moosgaards debuted exclusively as “the Prada twins” in 2015, deemed the most “coveted” job in modeling. Amalie is the older twin, and they were discovered in Aarhus, Denmark. The twins do most of their work together, but Amalie has also done separate work. They have also walked for brands such as Valentino, Alexander McQueen, Sonia Rykiel, and Vera Wang.

They have appeared in Numéro, Love, Dazed, Vogue Italia, and Interview.
