= Mona Tougaard =

Danish fashion model (born 2002)

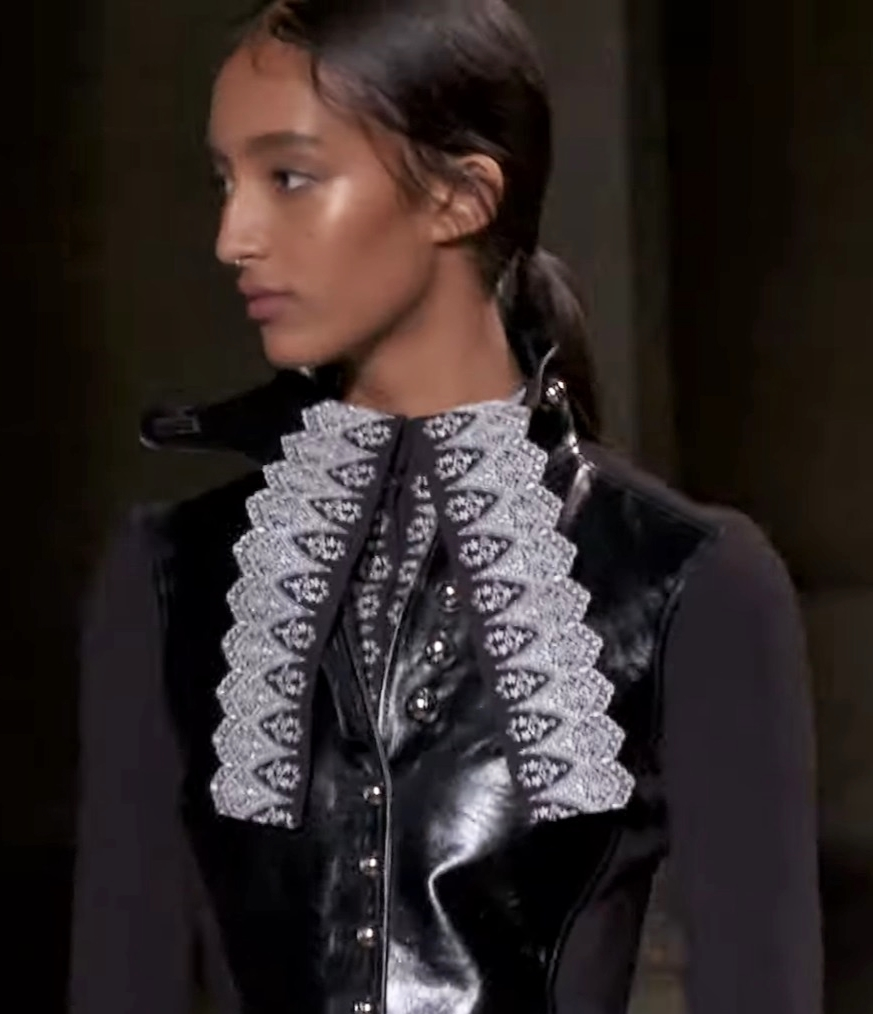
- Tougaard in 2020
- Born: Mona Tougaard; April 3, 2002 (age 24); Aarhus, Denmark
- Occupation: Model
- Years active: 2019–present
- Modeling information
- Height: 5 ft 10 1/2 in (1.79 m)
- Hair color: Brown
- Eye color: Brown
- Agency: The Society Management (New York); Next Management (London); Elite Model Management (worldwide) (mother agency)

Mona Tougaard (born April 3, 2002) is a Danish fashion model. She made her runway debut in 2019 at a Prada fashion show. She was nominated for Model of the Year at the 2024 Fashion Awards. Models.com has added Tougaard to its 'New Supers' list.

== Early life ==
Tougaard was born in Aarhus, Denmark, to a half Turkish, half Danish father and a Somali-Ethiopian mother. She has two older siblings from her mother's previous marriage. Her mother died when she was 9. She was scouted at age 12, and won the Elite Model Look Denmark contest when she was 15. She was a finalist in the global competition. Tougaard is part of the LGBTQ+ community, and has said that working in fashion helped her understand her sexuality.

== Career ==
Tougaard was discovered when she was 12 years old in Aarhus, Denmark and 3 years later she won the Elite Model Look in Denmark.

Tougaard debuted as a Prada exclusive in 2019. That season, she closed Karl Lagerfeld's final collection for Chanel. Between two seasons she opened for Loewe and Fendi, also walking for Chanel, Louis Vuitton, Stella McCartney, Valentino, Miu Miu, Versace, Burberry, Dior, Victoria Beckham, Max Mara, Lanvin (which she closed), Salvatore Ferragamo, Alberta Ferretti, Givenchy, Dries Van Noten, Paco Rabanne, Chloé, and Saint Laurent among 40 shows. She appeared in Prada's F/W 2019 "Anatomy of Romance" advertising campaign.

She has appeared in advertisements for Prada, Louis Vuitton, Loewe, Chanel, Max Mara, Chloé and Ports 1961. She appeared on the cover of i-D's Post Truth Truth issue with contributions by American model Adesuwa Aighewi.

For the F/W 2019 season, models.com deemed her a "top newcomer", with Vogue noticing, she "swept Paris Fashion Week, landing nearly all the city's key shows". She also ranked as the "Breakout Star" in models.com's "Model of the Year" Awards. She was previously ranked among the site's "Top 50" models, and was later added to its "New Supers" list.

She appeared on a cover for British Vogue's April 2021 issue and on the Italian Vogue in August 2021. Both she and Somali-American model Ugbad Abdi appear on the August 2022 cover of Vogue France.

In 2023, Tougaard appeared on the covers of British Vogue and Vogue France. For the F/W 2023 season Tougaard walked 39 shows and booked advertising campaigns and for the S/S 24 season Tougaard walked 22 shows.

In July 2024, Tougaard appeared on the cover of British Vogue alongside rapper Central Cee. In December 2024, she was nominated for Model of the Year at the Fashion Awards; the award went to Alex Consani. In 2025, she appeared on the cover of the October issue of Harper's Bazaar, photographed by Luis Alberto Rodriguez, and on the cover of the December 2025/January 2026 issue of Vogue France with Irina Shayk.

She appeared in the music videos for FKA Twigs' "Perfect Stranger" (2024) and Doja Cat's "Gorgeous" (2025). In 2025, Tougaard made her feature film debut in Alice Winocour's drama Couture, which screened in the Special Presentations section of the Toronto International Film Festival.

== Filmography ==
=== Films ===
List of film credits
Year	Title	Director	Role	Note
2019	Prada: Anatomy of Romance	Willy Vanderperre		Advertising short
2024	Chanel: Watches and Fine Jewelry Holiday	Oliver Hadlee Pearch		Advertising short
2025	Couture	Alice Winocour	Mona	

=== Music videos ===
List of music video credits
Year	Title	Artist	Director	Role	Note
2024	Perfect Stranger	FKA Twigs	Jordan Hemingway		
2025	Gorgeous	Doja Cat	Bardia Zeinali		
