= Jealous Type =

Single by Doja Cat

from the album Vie
- Released: August 21, 2025
- Genre: Disco-pop; funk-pop; pop rap
- Length: 2:43
- Label: Kemosabe; RCA
- Songwriters: Amala Zandile Dlamini; Ari David Starace; Jack Antonoff
- Producers: Y2K; Jack Antonoff

Doja Cat singles chronology
| "Lose My Mind" (2025) | "Jealous Type" (2025) | "Gorgeous" (2025) |

Music video
- "Jealous Type" on YouTube

"Jealous Type" is a song by American rapper and singer Doja Cat from her fifth studio album, Vie (2025). It was released on August 21, 2025, through Kemosabe and RCA Records as the lead single from the album. The song was written by Doja, alongside producers Y2K and Jack Antonoff, and is a disco-pop, funk-pop, and pop rap song. The song performed moderately, entering the top-forty in several countries and peaking at number 28 in the United States. At the 2025 MTV Video Music Awards, "Jealous Type" was nominated for Song of the Summer.

== Background ==
Doja Cat collaborated with Marc Jacobs in May 2025, and previewed a snippet of "Jealous Type" in the campaign's ad. On the same day she attended the Met Gala, where she stated in an interview that "Jealous Type" would be a single from her upcoming album. In August 2025, Doja headlined Outside Lands, where she performing several songs from her discography and a preview of "Jealous Type". On August 7, the pre-save link for "Jealous Type" was made available through her official website, where she also officially announced the song's release date as August 21, 2025, and revealed the cover art on August 13 via Instagram.

== Critical reception ==
"Jealous Type" received positive reviews from critics. Michael Saponara of Billboard described the track as feeling "like a return to Hot Pink Doja", and noted its disco-pop sound. Writing for Elle, Samuel Maude praised the track's '80s influences, and described it as a "great start for [Vie's] album cycle". Rolling Stone included "Jealous Type" on their best new music list for the release week dated August 22, 2025.

== Commercial performance ==
In the United States, "Jealous Type" debuted at number 28 on the Billboard Hot 100, for the chart week dated September 6, 2025. Additionally, it reached number three on the Hot Dance/Pop Songs chart. In the United Kingdom, the song debuted at number 13 on the UK Singles Chart dated August 29, 2025 as the highest new entry of the week, earning Doja Cat her nineteenth top-40 single in the country.

Elsewhere, in Australia the song debuted at number 28, while reaching the top forty in Canada, Ireland, New Zealand, Singapore and the Netherlands. Additionally, it reached the top sixty in Lithuania and Switzerland. On the Billboard Global 200, "Jealous Type" peaked at number 22.

== Music video ==
Directed by Boni Mata, the '80s inspired music video for "Jealous Type" was filmed in Los Angeles and released on August 22, 2025, alongside the song. Doja opens the video by pouring herself a glass of Patrón while flicking on a hifi stack system, and then proceeds to sit down and watch a home movie, of herself, played on a film projector. Later in the video, Doja comes face to face with a second version of herself. Both wearing '80s attire, they begin dancing on opposite sides of a limousine window, before coming together on the hood of the vehicle.

== Live performances ==
"Jealous Type" was performed for the first time at the 2025 Outside Lands festival, alongside two unreleased songs, "Cards" and "Take Me Dancing". At the 2025 MTV Video Music Awards, Doja Cat performed "Jealous Type" with Kenny G, as the opening performance of the show. Writing for Billboard, Jason Lipshutz stated "Doja Cat showed off her choreography skills, vocal theatrics and seasoned rap flow throughout the performance, which culminated in a dance breakdown with the pop star flanked by a guitarist and keytar player strutting with her step by step".

== Accolades ==
Awards and nominations for "Jealous Type"
| Ceremony | Year | Award | Result | Ref. |
|---|---|---|---|---|
| MTV Video Music Awards | 2025 | Song of Summer | Nominated | |

== Charts ==
=== Weekly charts ===
Weekly chart performance for "Jealous Type"
| Chart (2025–2026) | Peak position |
|---|---|
| Argentina Anglo Airplay (Monitor Latino) | 10 |
| Australia (ARIA) | 28 |
| Australia Hip Hop/R&B (ARIA) | 3 |
| Bolivia Anglo Airplay (Monitor Latino) | 6 |
| Canada Hot 100 (Billboard) | 35 |
| Canada CHR/Top 40 (Billboard) | 13 |
| Canada Hot AC (Billboard) | 30 |
| Central America Anglo Airplay (Monitor Latino) | 2 |
| Chile Anglo Airplay (Monitor Latino) | 8 |
| Colombia Anglo Airplay (Monitor Latino) | 12 |
| CIS Airplay (TopHit) | 95 |
| Costa Rica Anglo Airplay (Monitor Latino) | 6 |
| Croatia International Airplay (Top lista) | 64 |
| Dominican Republic Anglo Airplay (Monitor Latino) | 7 |
| Ecuador Anglo Airplay (Monitor Latino) | 13 |
| Estonia Airplay (TopHit) | 21 |
| France (SNEP) | 115 |
| Global 200 (Billboard) | 22 |
| Greece International Streaming (IFPI) | 80 |
| Guatemala Airplay (Monitor Latino) | 18 |
| Ireland (IRMA) | 27 |
| Japan Hot Overseas (Billboard Japan) | 5 |
| Latin America Anglo Airplay (Monitor Latino) | 11 |
| Latvia Airplay (LaIPA) | 18 |
| Lithuania (AGATA) | 50 |
| Lithuania Airplay (TopHit) | 20 |
| Malta Airplay (Radiomonitor) | 9 |
| Mexico Anglo Airplay (Monitor Latino) | 15 |
| Netherlands (Single Tip) | 2 |
| New Zealand (Recorded Music NZ) | 19 |
| Nicaragua Anglo Airplay (Monitor Latino) | 1 |
| Nigeria (TurnTable Top 100) | 80 |
| North Macedonia Airplay (Radiomonitor) | 6 |
| Panama Anglo Airplay (Monitor Latino) | 8 |
| Paraguay Airplay (Monitor Latino) | 11 |
| Portugal (AFP) | 74 |
| Romania Airplay (TopHit) | 195 |
| Serbia Airplay (Radiomonitor) | 10 |
| Singapore (RIAS) | 21 |
| Slovakia Airplay (ČNS IFPI) | 61 |
| South Africa Airplay (TOSAC) | 12 |
| Suriname (Nationale Top 40) | 11 |
| Sweden Heatseeker (Sverigetopplistan) | 12 |
| Switzerland (Schweizer Hitparade) | 57 |
| UK Singles (Official Charts) | 13 |
| US Billboard Hot 100 | 28 |
| US Adult Pop Airplay (Billboard) | 27 |
| US Hot Dance/Pop Songs (Billboard) | 3 |
| US Pop Airplay (Billboard) | 9 |
| US Rhythmic Airplay (Billboard) | 1 |
| Venezuela Anglo Airplay (Monitor Latino) | 2 |

=== Monthly charts ===
Monthly chart performance for "Jealous Type"
| Chart (2025) | Peak position |
|---|---|
| CIS Airplay (TopHit) | 99 |
| Estonia Airplay (TopHit) | 26 |
| Lithuania Airplay (TopHit) | 27 |
| Paraguay Airplay (SGP) | 100 |

=== Year-end charts ===
Year-end chart performance for "Jealous Type"
| Chart (2025) | Position |
|---|---|
| Canada CHR/Top 40 (Billboard) | 80 |
| Canada Hot AC (Billboard) | 100 |
| Estonia Airplay (TopHit) | 147 |
| US Hot Dance/Pop Songs (Billboard) | 13 |

== Certifications ==
Certifications and sales
| Region | Certification | Certified units/sales |
|---|---|---|
| New Zealand (RMNZ) | Gold | 15,000^{‡} |
| United Kingdom (BPI) | Silver | 200,000^{‡} |
^{‡} Sales+streaming figures based on certification alone.

== Release history ==
Release dates and formats for "Jealous Type"
| Region | Date | Format(s) | Label(s) | Ref. |
|---|---|---|---|---|
| Various | August 21, 2025 | Digital download; streaming | Kemosabe; RCA | |
| United States | August 26, 2025 | Contemporary hit radio; rhythmic contemporary radio | Kemosabe; RCA | |
| Italy | August 29, 2025 | Radio airplay | Sony Italy | |
