= André Balazs =

American businessman and hotelier (born 1957)

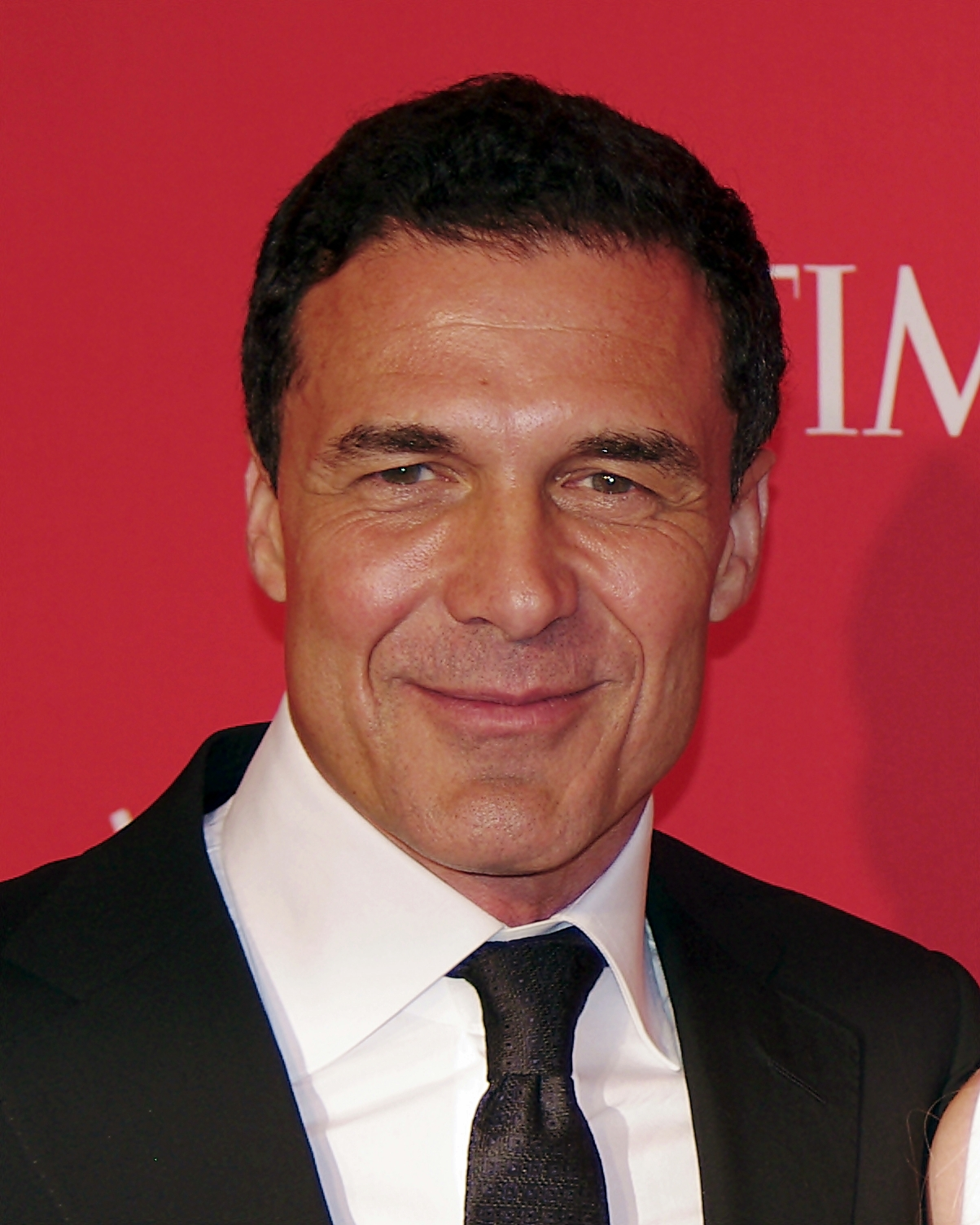
- Balazs at the 2012 Time 100 gala
- Born: André Tomas Balazs; January 31, 1957 (age 69); Boston, Massachusetts, U.S.
- Education: Cornell University; Columbia University
- Occupations: Hotelier; Residential developer
- Known for: Standard Hotels; Chateau Marmont
- Spouse: Katie Ford (m. 1985; div. 2004)
- Partner: Cosima Vesey (2017–present)
- Children: 3

André Tomas Balazs (born January 31, 1957) is an American businessman and hotelier. He is president and chief executive officer of André Balazs Properties, a portfolio of hotels across the United States and residences in New York, especially in New York City.

== Early life and education ==
Balazs was born in Boston, Massachusetts. His father, Endre Alexander Balázs, was a research professor at Harvard Medical School, founded the Retina Foundation and the Boston Biomedical Research Institute, and was director of ophthalmic research at Columbia-Presbyterian Medical Center. His mother, Eva K. Balazs, was a family therapist and psychologist at McLean Hospital. Also a musician, she later helped form the New New Orleans Jazz Band.

Balazs graduated from Buckingham, Browne & Nichols School, a private preparatory school in Cambridge, Massachusetts. He later attended Cornell University, where he was a member of the Quill and Dagger society. Balazs also attended the Columbia University Graduate School of Journalism, where he earned a joint master's degree in journalism and business.

== Career ==
In 1980, Balazs was hired by David Garth Associates as press secretary to Bess Myerson, a Democratic candidate for U.S. Senate from New York.

In 1988, Balazs co-founded the biotechnology company Biomatrix with his father. The company developed six hyaluronan products before being sold in 2000 to Genzyme for an estimated $738 million.

Between 1988 and 1989, Balazs invested in projects including the Manhattan nightclub M.K. and the Los Angeles supper club b.c. In 1989, he purchased The Mercer Hotel property in SoHo, a 100-year-old manufacturing loft. In 1990, he purchased and restored the Chateau Marmont, built in 1929 on Sunset Boulevard, for just over $12 million. In 1997, he acquired and updated the Sunset Beach Hotel and Restaurant on Shelter Island. The following year, Balazs reopened the redeveloped Mercer Hotel and launched Mercer Kitchen.

In 1998, Balazs opened the first of five Standard hotels in West Hollywood. Additional locations followed in Downtown Los Angeles, Miami, and two in New York City. Balazs sold his interest in the real estate and management company in 2017.

Balazs emphasized culinary programs across his properties. Restaurants include the Standard Grill in New York; the Lido Restaurant and Bayside Grill at The Standard Spa, Miami and Sunset Beach; Bar Marmont and the terrace restaurant at Chateau Marmont, with Carolynn Spence; and the Standard Biergartens in New York and Downtown LA, with chef Kurt Gutenbrunner.

In 2007, Balazs began a rosé wine collaboration with Wölffer Estate Vineyard on Long Island.

In 2011, he launched a seaplane service to the Hamptons from Manhattan.

In 2012, he established The Farm at Locusts-on-Hudson, located on the former Astor family estate in Hyde Park, New York, to grow organic produce for his restaurants.

Balazs owns the Chiltern Firehouse, a hotel in a former fire station in London. He partnered with Studio KO on the design and remains actively involved in creative direction.

He has also developed residential projects, including 15 William, a condominium in New York City's Financial District.

In June 2021, Balazs sold his 4,200-square-foot, four-bedroom loft in SoHo's New Museum Building at 158 Mercer Street for $10.35 million. He had purchased the unit in 2003 for $5.75 million.

In 2023, Balazs partnered with experiential hospitality group Habitas to open its first U.S. location in Rhinebeck, New York. Purchased prior to the COVID-19 pandemic, the 30-room hotel features a restaurant and bar, swimmable pond, hiking and biking trails, and saunas. Room rates start at approximately $450 per night.

== Boards and awards ==
In 1982, Balazs was recruited by Andy Warhol as one of the founding trustees of the New York Academy of Art. He has been on the boards of the New York Public Theater and the Wolfsonian Museum, affiliated with Florida International University.

In 2011, Balazs received the first Design Patron Award from the Cooper Hewitt, Smithsonian Design Museum in New York City.

In 2014, he received a British GQ magazine’s "Men of the Year" award in the entrepreneur category.

== Personal life ==
Balazs married Katie Ford on November 16, 1985; they divorced in 2004. They have two daughters. He was engaged to actress Uma Thurman from 2003 to 2007 but never married. They briefly rekindled their relationship from 2014 to 2015. He also had a relationship with comedienne Chelsea Handler from 2011 to 2013.

His partner, Cosima Vesey, the daughter of Sita-Maria de Breffny and Thomas Vesey, 7th Viscount de Vesci, gave birth to their son on July 9, 2017.

In 2007, Christie's announced that Balazs was the winning bidder for a 1951 example of Jean Prouvé's Maison Tropicale. He reportedly paid $4.97 million for the house.

In 2017, The New York Times reported allegations that Balazs had "groped" Amanda Anka at a dinner in London hosted by him for Jennifer Aniston and Justin Theroux. Additional reports described a pattern of sexual misconduct dating back to at least the early 1990s. A statement issued by Anka and her husband, Jason Bateman, said that "his actions were dealt with at the time."

== Works ==
- Balazs, André (1996). Hollywood Handbook. Universe. ISBN 978-0-7893-0023-2.
- Mendes, Nuno; Balazs, André (2017). Chiltern Firehouse: The Cookbook. Ten Speed Press. ISBN 978-1-60774-993-6.
