= Ugbad Abdi =

Somali and American fashion model

- Born: 1999 or 2000 (age 26–27); Kismayo, Somalia
- Occupation: Model
- Years active: 2019–present
- Modeling information
- Height: 5 ft 11 in (1.80 m)
- Hair color: Brown
- Eye color: Brown
- Agency: Next Management (worldwide)

Ugbad Abdi is a Somali-American fashion model. Born in Kismayo, Somalia and raised in a Kenyan refugee camp and Des Moines, Iowa, she debuted as a Valentino haute couture model, then opened shows for Marc Jacobs and Michael Kors at New York Fashion Week. She is the first model to walk shows for Fendi and Lanvin while wearing hijab.

== Early life ==
Ugbad was born in Kismayo, Somalia. Her family fled the brutal Somali Civil War, first to a refugee camp in Kenya, then in 2009, when Ugbad was nine years old, to Des Moines, Iowa with the help of UNICEF. Shortly after graduating from high school in Des Moines, Ugbad was scouted on Instagram. She visited New York for the first time to meet with agency representatives, and signed with Next Management.

== Career ==
Ugbad made her runway debut in the 2018/2019 Valentino haute couture show. She has opened New York Fashion Week shows for Marc Jacobs and Michael Kors. Ugbad has also walked in shows for Chanel, Miu Miu, Simone Rocha, Burberry, Fendi, Lanvin, Max Mara, and Dries van Noten. In April 2019, she appeared in British, American, and Arabian editions of Vogue simultaneously. Ugbad has been called "one of Fall 2019's breakout models". In 2022, she appeared on the cover of Vogue France with Danish model Mona Tougaard.

== Personal life ==
Ugbad is Muslim, and began wearing hijab at the age of fourteen. She wears head coverings while modeling, and in 2019 became Fendi and Lanvin's first runway model to wear hijab. She has six siblings, two of whom were born after the family moved to the United States. She speaks Somali and English.

== Filmography ==
Music Videos
Year	Title	Artist	Role	Note
2025	Gorgeous	Doja Cat	Herself	
