= Ford Models =

American modeling agency

- Company type: Private
- Industry: Fashion
- Founded: 1946; 80 years ago
- Founder: Eileen Ford; Gerard W. Ford
- Headquarters: 11 E. 26th St., 14th Floor, Manhattan, New York City, U.S.
- Owner: Privately owned
- Website: fordmodels.com

Ford Models, originally the Ford Modeling Agency, is an American international modeling agency based in New York City. It was established in 1946 by Eileen Ford and her husband Gerard W. Ford.

== History ==
=== 20th century ===
Eileen and Jerry began the business in their Manhattan home in 1946. In the late 20th century, the company emerged as one of the preeminent New York City-based modeling agencies.

In the 1970s, like many of the original modeling agencies, Ford began facing competition from other leading agencies, including Women Management, IMG Models, and others.

In 1980, the company established Ford Models Supermodel of the World, which attracted more than 60,000 hopefuls annually from around the world. Today, the contest lives on in the form of the annual V/VMan Ford Model Search run in conjunction with the two Visionaire publications.

Ford's competition increased even further in the 1980s when John Casablancas opened Elite Model Management, leading to greatly intensified competition among the largest agencies.

The agency has represented a diverse list of models and celebrities.

In 1995, the Fords' daughter, Katie Ford, was appointed as the chief executive officer of the agency, which she led for 12 years.

=== 21st century ===
In the early 21st century, the company diversified through Ford Artists to represent talent in the hair, makeup and wardrobe industries. It has also promoted itself through its social media platform, which includes Ford Models Blog, Twitter, Facebook, and YouTube. Ford Models has also lent its name to an imprint of Random House books, which created a series of teen novels that served to try to glamorize working with the agency.

In December 2000, Magnum Sports and Entertainment signed a letter of intent to acquire Ford Models, but the transaction fell through.

In 2007, John Caplan was appointed Ford Models' chief executive officer.

In December 2007, the Fords sold a stake of their to private equity firm Stone Tower Equity Partners.

In 2009, the firm was renamed Altpoint Capital Partners in 2009. Altpoint is operated by managing partner Gerald Banks, also known as Guerman Aliev, and owned and funded by Russian oligarch Vladimir Potanin through his holding company Interros.

In January 2011, Altpoint increased its stake in Ford Models to 93%. Also in 2011, the company diversified into the art gallery business under the leadership of chairman Guerman Aliev.

In May 2020, Ford Models Brasil purchased Ford Models from Altpoint amidst uncertainty related to covid-accelerated industry digitalization and the lack of a CEO at Ford Models for a number of months.

== Ford Artists ==
In addition to modeling, the agency diversified into other fields of representation related to the fashion industry through Ford Artists, including hair stylists, makeup artists, manicurists, stylists, set designers, prop stylists, art directors, and photographers. Ford Artists maintains locations in Chicago and Los Angeles.

== Headquarters and locations ==
In addition to its global headquarters on 26th Street in Manhattan, Ford Models has offices in Chicago, Los Angeles, Miami, Paris, and Barcelona.

== Models ==
As of January 2022, Ford Models represents the following models:

- Barbara Palvin
- Sigrid Agren
- Monica Aksamit
- Charlene Almarvez
- Alex Binaris
- Kacey Carrig
- Estelle Chen
- Mischa Cohen
- Oliver Cheshire
- Sora Choi
- Hailey Clauson
- Cintia Dicker
- Daniel Di Tomasso
- Cora Emmanuel
- Kelly Gale
- David Gandy
- Kris Grikaite
- Kenya Kinski-Jones
- Ella Halikas
- Sui He
- Calisto Catawnee
- Brad Kroenig
- Alexandra Micu
- Hannah Motler
- Alison Nix
- Radhika Nair
- Giselle Norman
- Andreja Pejić
- Tyson Ritter
- Charo Ronquillo
- Miriam Sánchez
- Paul Sculfor
- Evandro Soldati
- Hana Soukupová
- Fran Summers
- Caroline Trentini

== See also ==
- List of modeling agencies
