= Sergei Smolin =

Russian producer

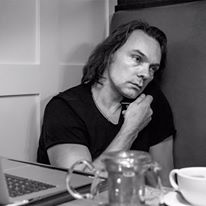
- Born: 22 November 1962 (age 63); Moscow, USSR
- Occupation: producer
- Years active: Since 1989

Sergei Borisovich Smolin aka Smok (November 22, 1962, Moscow) — Russian producer famous for his work with the band Kvartal, Andrey Makarevich, Igor Butman, Vadym Kholodenko, Aishwarya Majmudar, Clint Eastwood, Billy Gibbons and others.

Smolin has worked with numerous Russian bands and musicians over the years: Zemfira, Mashina Vremeni, Chaif, Splean, and Bi-2.

He is the founder and creative director of Arena Marketing Communications, the communication company ЁШ Agency and the film company AMALGAMA Studios.

He is the mastermind and one of the authors of the international cultural initiative India Inside.

== Biography ==
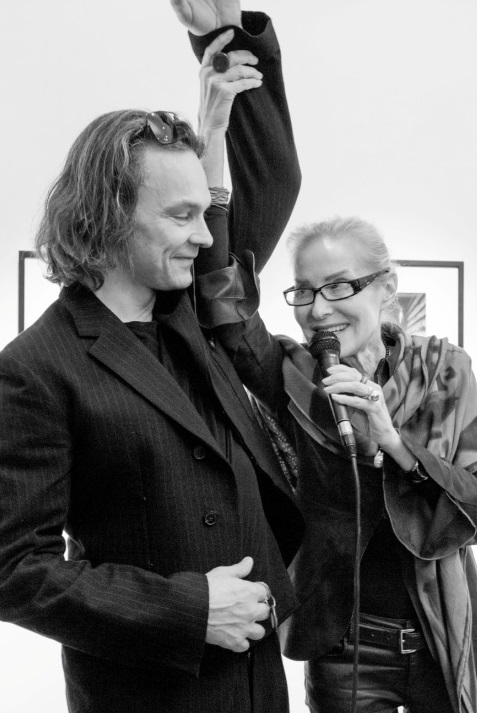
Sergei Smolin and Olga Sviblova at the Igor Vereshchagin's exhibition Given & Stolen

Sergei Smolin graduated from the State University of Management with a degree in Transportation Organization and Management. In 1989 he became the producer for the band Kvartal, working in this capacity for the next twelve years. Smolin produced the initial release of the band's LP “Vse zemnoye stalo strannym” (1992), subsequently issued under the Melodiya label, as well as all of the band's subsequent releases — “Rezinovye Dzhungli” (1994), “Vkhod dlya Postoronnikh” (1995, Gala/EMI Records) and “Mir Rozovykh Kukol” (1998, DS Records). In 2000, Sergei Smolin created “Vremya Naprokat”, a reading of Andrey Makarevich's early songs by Artur Pilyavin. The song “Ty ili ya” (originally titled “Solnechniy Ostrov”) spent several weeks at the top of the Russian charts. Smolin parted ways with the band in 2002, following the tragic death of Kvartal's artistic director Artur Pilyavin, citing “the impossibility of working with this music band without Artur Pilyavin.”

=== Arena Marketing Communications ===
In 2000, Sergei Smolin created Arena Marketing Communications, which has grown to become a significant player in the marketing field over the course of its 17 years’ existence. The agency's clients include The Coca-Cola Co., Nestle, Kraft Foods, IKEA, Japan Tobacco, Philip Morris, MEGA Family Shopping Centre, MTS, BSGV, Citibank, and Pony Express. From the very beginning, Arena Marketing Communications took part in numerous Russia-wide marketing campaigns, including Schweppes-Mania, Sprite Driver, and Sprite-Hunt.

=== Other creative projects ===
In 2016, Sergei Smolin began working with composer Gennady Rovner on the first part of India Inside, an international project which encompassed a symphonic composition, an electro-acoustic noise album and a documentary film. Over 300 performers from all around the world took part in the project, including two symphony orchestras, a European choir, Indian musicians and jazz musicians working across six studios: in Moscow (“Mosfilm”), London (Real World Studios, AIR Studios, Strongroom Music Studios, Metropolis) and Mumbai (Yash Raj Films). Former chief engineer at Abbey Road Studios and multiple-Grammy Award-winner Haydn Bendall was the sound producer on the album. The project received official support from the Russian Ministry of Foreign Affairs and plaudits from Sergei Lavrov.

In March 2017, Sergei Smolin was the producer and organizer of “Given & Stolen”, an exhibition of work by photographer Igor Vereshchagin presented at the Moscow Museum of Modern Art. In conjunction with the exhibition, MMOMA and the Multimedia Art Museum held a series of special events in which Olga Sviblova, Garik Sukhachov, Mikhail Yefremov, Mikhail Gorevoy and others took part. According to MMOMA, the exhibition became one of the most-attended cultural events of the capital.

On February 14, 2019, as part of the 11th Moscow International Biennale “Fashion and Style in Photography-2019,” the Moscow Multimedia Art Museum presented “Igor Vereshchagin. Non-Objective Reality,” an exhibition produced by Sergei Smolin.

AMALGAMA Studios, Los Angeles

In October 2018, Sergei Smolin and a group of partners started the film company AMALGAMA Studios in Los Angeles which in January 2019 began filming a six-episode documentary titled Long Play (director — Stephen Crisman aka Zemo, screenwriter — Sergei Smolin, Stephen Crisman, producers — Sergei Smolin (Amalgama), Duncan Heath (ITG), Michael Cascio, director of photography — Sergei Kozlov). Long Play is scheduled for release in October 2020. The series’ main characters are Clint Eastwood, Billy Gibbons, Tom Freston, Jerry Moss, Darryl McDaniels and others.

== Personal life ==
Sergei Smolin was married to Natalia Shanetskaya, a business anchor for the TV channels Russia Today and TV Rain. He has two sons and a daughter.
