= Rape of Iryna Krashkova =

Sexual assault incident in Ukraine

Vradiivka protests
- Part of Lead up to Euromaidain: Rise up, Ukraine!
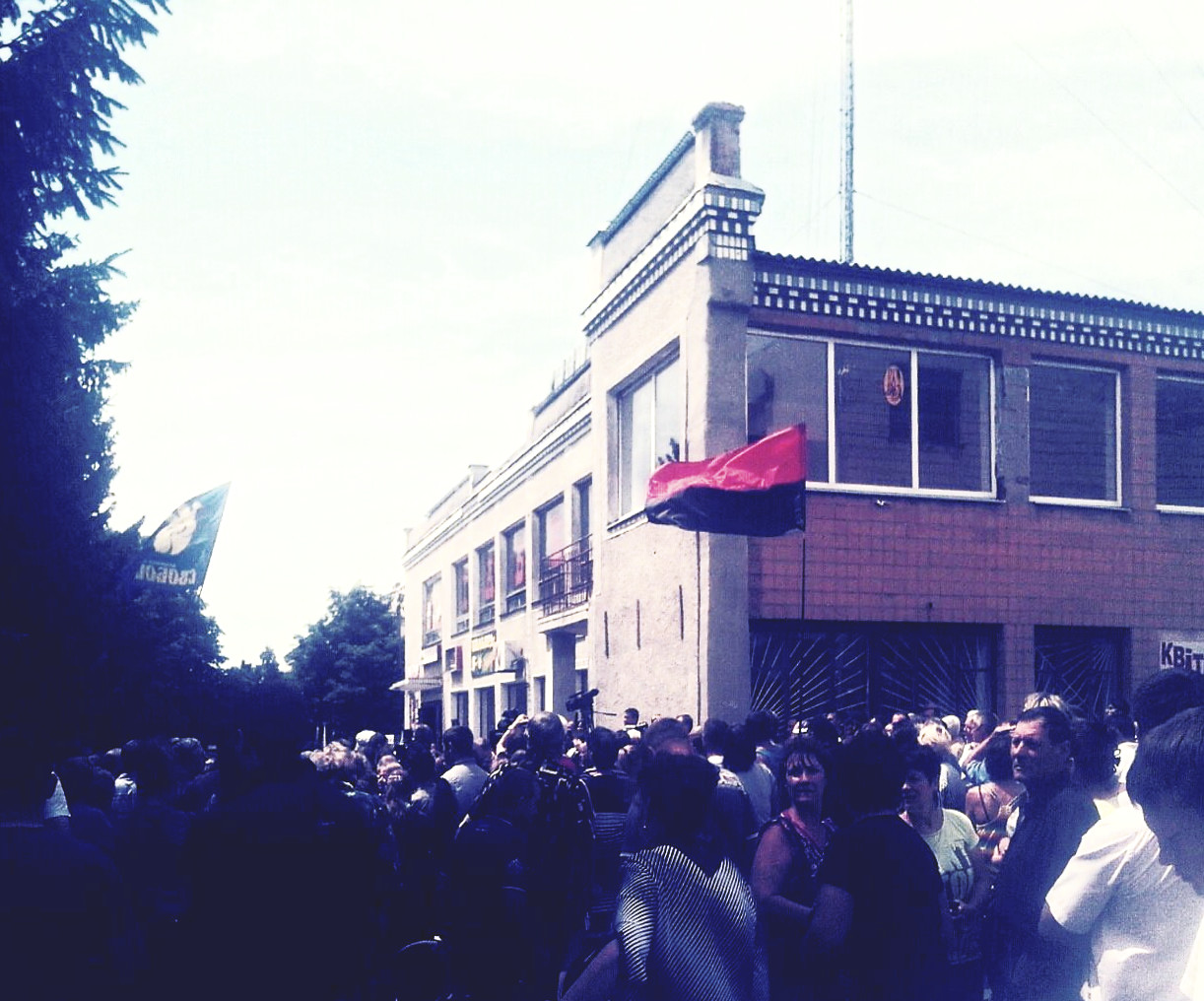
- Crowd near the Vradiivka Raion police department on 2 July 2013
- Date: 30 June – 3 July 2013
- Location: Vradiivka, Ukraine
- Caused by: Police brutality, refusal to bring to justice
- Methods: picketing, unarmed mob assault on militsiya office
- Result: wave of protests across the country, two main suspects were sentenced to jail eventually

Parties
local residents Svoboda	local militsiya Berkut detachment government officials

Number
300	

The rape of Iryna Krashkova, a 29-year-old woman, on 26 June 2013 by three men in the urban-type settlement of Vradiivka became a cause célèbre in Ukraine when anger at police for not arresting one of the suspects led to angry protests and the storming of the district police department on 1 July 2013.

The protests occurred alongside another political protests that were taken place in Ukraine under the motto Rise up, Ukraine!.

== Attack, investigation and riots ==
According to the then 29-year-old Iryna Krashkova on 26 June 2013 three men pulled her into a car in the village of Vradiivka and took her to the forest near the village of Syrove, where they beat and raped her. They abandoned her there unconscious but later returned and searched the area with lanterns (according to a friend of the victim). Early the next morning Krashkova crawled naked to Syrove where she was found and taken to the infirmary. Krashkova was hospitalized with open fractures of the skull, wounds to the head and face, multiple bruises and hematomas.

Krashkova told police investigator that she was beaten and raped by two police officers – Lt. Dmytro Polischuk and Lt. Yevhen Dryzhak (both of whom she knew by sight) – and that a local taxi driver, Mykhailo Rabinenko, participated in the beating.

Polischuk and Rabinenko were detained on 30 June. Dryzhak, according to law enforcers, had an alibi – being on duty at the police department at the time of the crime. This triggered protests by Vradiivka residents who demanded Dryzhak's immediate arrest. Many of the protesters suspected that the policeman was being protected by local authorities because of family connections. On 1 July 2013 more than 500 protesters stormed the Vradiivka Raion police department, demanding the police officers involved be prosecuted. They smashed windows, broke doors and set fire to the building. In return the police used tear gas against protesters, some of whom were covered in blood. There were further demonstrations in Lviv, Donetsk, and near the Presidential Administration Building in Kyiv.

On 2 July 2013 Dryzhak was detained. General Prosecutor of Ukraine Viktor Pshonka dismissed prosecutor Serhiy Mochalko "for the improper performance of his duties of supervision over legality of the investigation by law-enforcement agencies". Two senior regional police officials were also fired. Ukrainian President Viktor Yanukovych ordered a thorough investigation and Interior Minister Vitaliy Zakharchenko was summoned to the Verkhovna Rada where the opposition called for his dismissal and the dismissal of the Governor of Mykolaiv Oblast, Mykola Kruhlov. During the investigation the Deputy Chief of the Vradiivka police department, Major Mykhailo Kudrinskiy, was charged with concealing the crime.

On 7 July 2013 a group of about a dozen people started a protest march from Vradiivka to (the capital) Kyiv with planned to camp on Maidan Nezalezhnosti indefinitely until their concerns have been addressed. Authorities allowed the protest in the square on 18 July; police dispersed the protest on 19 July 2013.

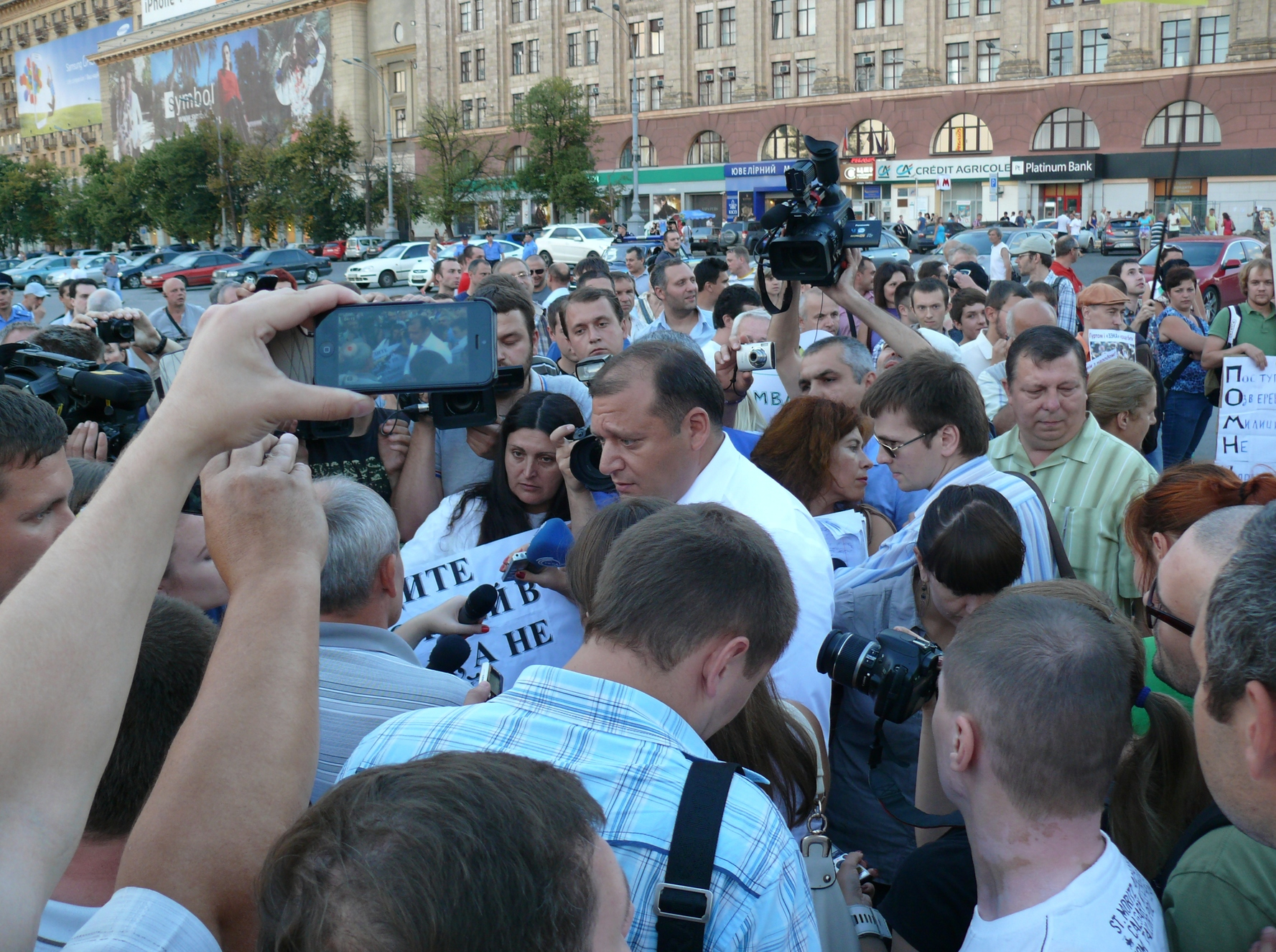
Mykhailo Dobkin, a governor of Kharkiv Oblast talks with protesters in Kharkiv

== Court sentences ==
On 29 November 2013 a Ukrainian court sentenced Dryzhak and Polischuk to 15 years of imprisonment each, with confiscation of their properties and deprivation of their police ranks. Kudrynsky received five years imprisonment, confiscation of property and deprivation of his police rank, while Rabynenko was sentenced to eleven years of imprisonment with confiscation of all property.

== See also ==
- Murder of Oksana Makar
- Mazhory
