= Rovner =

Rovner is a surname. Notable people with the surname include:

- Anton Rovner, composer
- Gennady Rovner, composer
- Ilana Rovner, American jurist
- Irwin Rovner, archaeologist
- Julie Rovner, journalist
- Michal Rovner, photographer
- Pinkhus Rovner, Bolshevik political figure
- Robert Rovner, television producer and writer
- Robert A. Rovner, American politician from Pennsylvania
