= Albert Watson (photographer) =

Scottish photographer (born 1942)

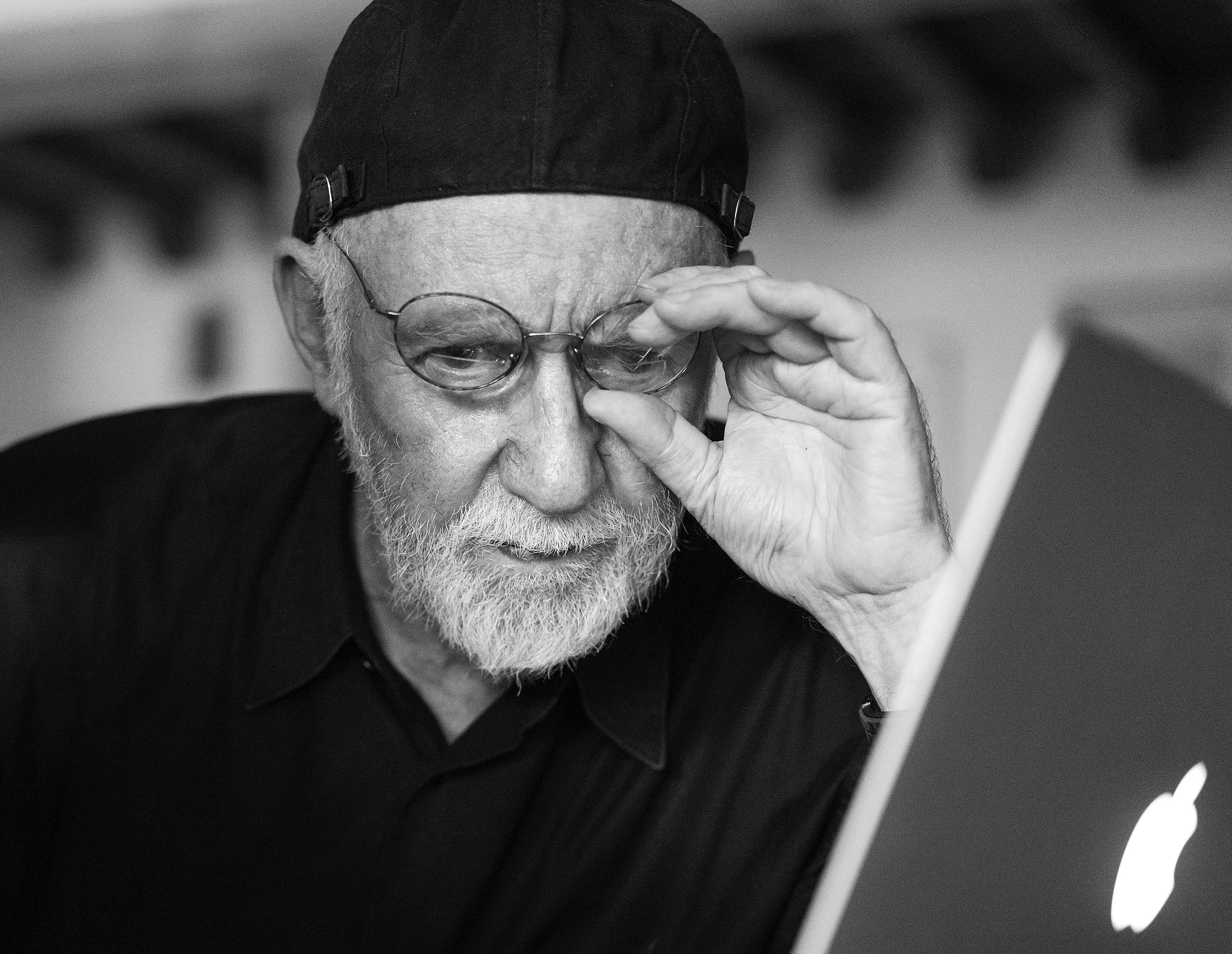
- Watson in 2016

Albert Watson OBE (born 1942) is a Scottish fashion, celebrity and art photographer. He has shot over 100 covers of Vogue and 40 covers of Rolling Stone magazine since the mid-1970s, and has created major advertising campaigns for clients such as Prada, Chanel and Levis. Watson has also taken some well-known photographs, from the portrait of Steve Jobs that appeared on the cover of his biography, a photo of Alfred Hitchcock holding a plucked goose, and a portrait of a nude Kate Moss taken on her 19th birthday.

Watson's prints of his photography are exhibited in galleries and museums worldwide. Photo District News named him one of the 20 most influential photographers of all time, along with Richard Avedon and Irving Penn, among others. Watson has won numerous honors, including a Lucie Award, a Grammy Award, the Hasselblad Masters Award and three ANDY Awards,. He was awarded The Royal Photographic Society's Centenary Medal and Honorary Fellowship (HonFRPS) in recognition of a sustained, significant contribution to the art of photography in 2010. Queen Elizabeth II awarded Watson an Order of the British Empire (OBE) in June 2015 for 'services to photography'.

== Early life ==
Albert Watson was born in Edinburgh, Scotland, the son of a physical education teacher. He grew up in Penicuik, Midlothian, and attended the Rudolf Steiner School in Edinburgh and Lasswade High School.

He studied graphic design at the Duncan of Jordanstone College of Art and Design in Dundee, and film and television at the Royal College of Art in London. Though blind in one eye since birth, Watson also studied photography as part of his curriculum.

== Career ==
In 1970, Watson moved to the United States with his wife, Elizabeth, who got a job as an elementary school teacher in Los Angeles, where Watson began shooting photos, mostly as a hobby. Later that year, Watson was introduced to an art director at Max Factor, who offered him his first test session, from which the company purchased two images. Watson’s distinctive style garnered the attention of American and European fashion magazines such as Mademoiselle, GQ and Harper’s Bazaar, and he began commuting between Los Angeles and New York. Albert photographed his first celebrity in 1973, a portrait of Alfred Hitchcock holding a dead goose with a ribbon around its neck, for that year's Harper's Bazaar's Christmas issue. The image has become one of Watson's most famous portraits on a list that now includes hundreds of well-known photographs of movie stars, rock stars, rappers, supermodels, even President Clinton and Queen Elizabeth II. In 1975, Watson won a Grammy Award for the photography on the cover of the Mason Proffit album "Come and Gone," and in 1976, he landed his first job for Vogue. With his move to New York that same year, his career took off.

In addition to photography for magazines, Watson created the images for hundreds of successful advertising campaigns for major corporations, such as the GAP, Levi’s, Revlon and Chanel, and he has directed more than 100 TV commercials and photographed dozens of posters for major Hollywood movies, such as Kill Bill, Memoirs of a Geisha, and The Da Vinci Code. All the while, Watson has spent much of his time working on personal projects, taking photographs from his travels and interests, from Marrakech to Las Vegas to the Orkney Islands. Much of this work, along with his well-known portraits and fashion photographs, has been shown in museum and gallery shows around the world, and Watson's limited-edition prints have become highly sought after by collectors. In 2007, a large-format Watson print of a Kate Moss photograph taken in 1993 sold at Christie's in London for $108,000, five times the low pre-sale estimate. The art critic Francis Hodgson, in a gallery review of Watson for the Financial Times of London, called the prints "astonishing". Watson is regarded as a master print-maker and has lectured on the subject at numerous venues, including PhotoPlus International Expo in New York, the National Portrait Gallery in London, and Le Recontres de la Photographie Art Festival in Arles, France.

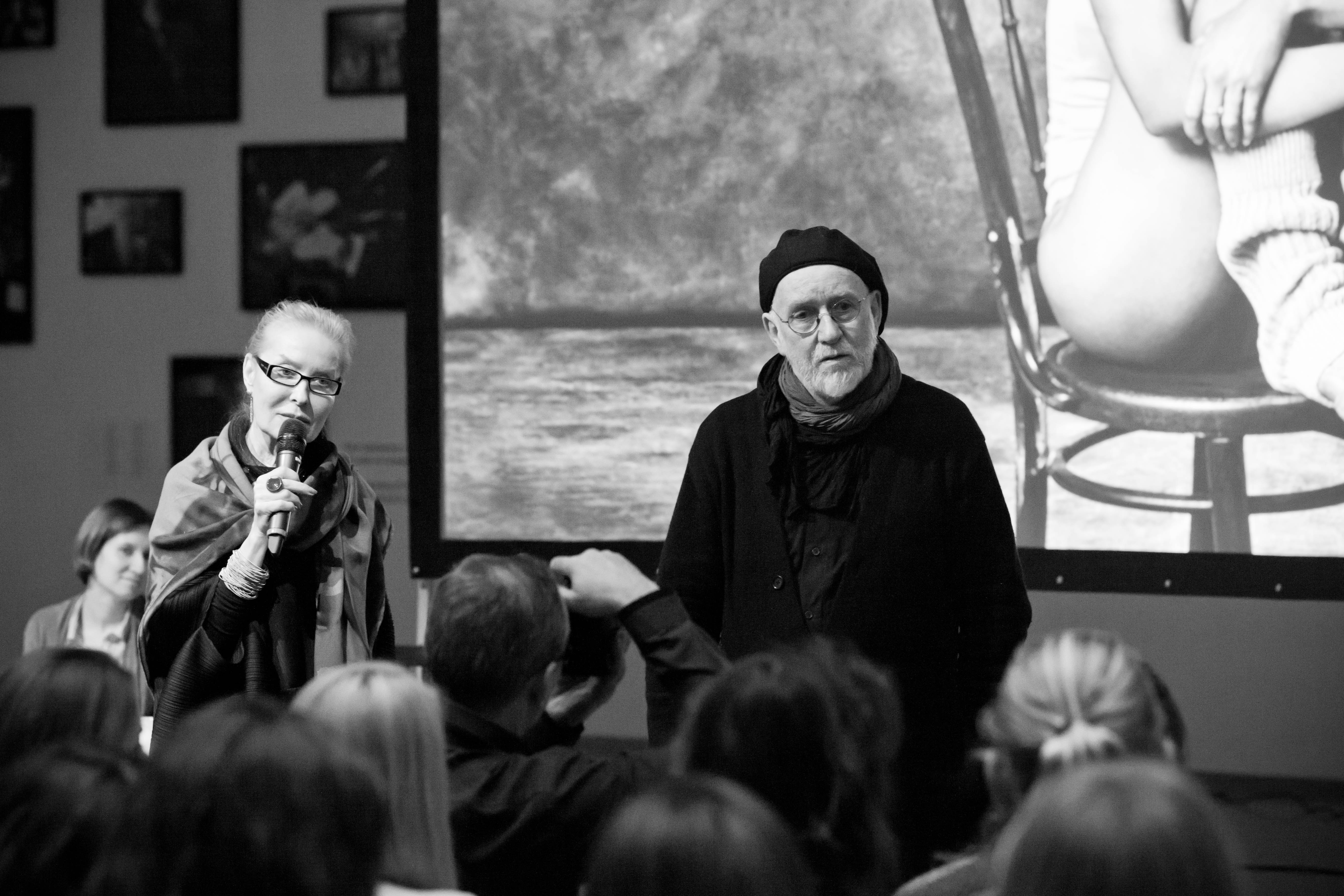
The MAMM's Olga Sviblova with Albert Watson

Watson has had numerous solo museum shows around the world, including at the Museum of Modern Art in Milan, Italy; the KunstHausWien in Vienna, Austria; the City Art Centre in Edinburgh; the Fotomuseum in Antwerp, Belgium; the NRW Forum in Düsseldorf, Germany; Fotografiska, in Stockholm, Sweden; the Deichtorhallen in Hamburg, Germany; and the Multimedia Art Museum, Moscow, Russia, among others. Watson was the first Western photographer to be exhibited at the Lianzhou Museum of Photography in Lianzhou, China, with an exhibition in December 2017. Watson’s photographs have also been shown in many group shows at museums, including the National Portrait Gallery in London, the Metropolitan Museum of Art and Brooklyn Museum in New York, the Pushkin Museum of Fine Arts in Moscow, the International Center of Photography in New York, and the Deichtorhallen in Hamburg, Germany. His photographs are included in the permanent collections at the National Portrait Gallery, the Smithsonian, and the Metropolitan Museum of Art.

Watson has published several books, including Cyclops (1994, Little, Brown), Maroc (1998, Rizzoli), "Albert Watson" (2007, Phaidon). Two books were released in the fall of 2010: "UFO: Unified Fashion Objectives," a look at 40 years of selected Watson fashion photographs, and "Strip Search," a two-volume set of hundreds of photographs Watson took in Las Vegas. There is also Kaos (2017, Taschen). In addition, many catalogs of Watson’s photographs have been published for shows, including "The Vienna Album" (2005).

Watson received an honorary degree from the University of Dundee in 1995 and was inducted into the Scottish Fashion Awards Hall of Fame in 2006. His first exhibition in his homeland, Frozen, was held at the City Art Centre of Edinburgh in 2006.

== Exhibitions ==
=== Solo exhibitions ===
2007

- rétrospective, Galerie Acte 2, Paris
- Albert Watson, Young Gallery, Brussels, Belgium
- Epic, Guy Hepner Contemporary, Los Angeles, United States
- Frozen, Photo Museum Antwerp, Antwerpen, Belgium
- Haus der Kunst, Wien, Austria
- A Few Portraits, 401 Projects, New York

2008

- Contact, Galería Hartmann, Barcelona, Spain
- Miss Beehayving, Hamiltons, London

2009

- The white rabbit, Fondazione FORMA per la Fotografia, Milan, Italy
- Albert Watson, Camera Work, Berlin
- Best Of – Albert Watson, NRW-Forum Kultur und Wirtschaft, Düsseldorf, Germany

2010

- Albert Watson Hasted Kraeutler, New York City
- Retrospektive – Albert Watson, Flo Peters Gallery, Hamburg, Germany
- UFO – Unified Fashion Objectives, Galería Hartmann, Barcelona, Spain
- Young Gallery, Brussels, Belgium

2011

- Exposed, Galerie Acte 2, Paris
- I observe – Retrospective, Kahmann Gallery, Amsterdam, Netherlands
- Fotografiska Museum, Stockholm, Sweden
- UFO – Unified Fashion Objectives, A.Galerie, Paris
- Vintage Watson, Hamiltons, London

2012

- Albert Watson in Morocco, Flo Peters Gallery, Hamburg, Germany
- Albert Watson Archive, Izzy Gallery, Toronto, Canada
- Timeless Beauty, C/O Berlin, Berlin
- Camera Work: Color Photography, CWC Gallery, Berlin
- The expression of Identity, St. Moritz Art Masters, St Moritz, Switzerland
- Treat Photographs: Sacpe, Hasteds Krautler Gallery, New York
- Hamilton 'Modern Masters', London
- Icons of tomorrow, Christophe Guye Galerie, Zurich, Switzerland
- Galerie de l'aimance Casblanca, Morocco

2013

- 14 Days in Benin, Rautenstrauch Joest Museum, Cologne, Germany
- Visions, Deichtorhallen, Hamburg Germany
- Vintage, Cyclops Hasted Kraeutler Gallery, New York
- Visions, Deichtorhallen, Hamburg, Germany

2014

- Silver Linings, Young Gallery, Brussels, Belgium
- Classics, Qvale Gallery, Oslo, Norway

2015

- Roids!, Christophe Guye Galerie, Zurich
- Multimedia Art Museum, Moscow, Russia
- Silver Linings, Izzy Gallery, Toronto, Canada

=== Group exhibitions ===
2003

- Rolling Stones, Camera Work, Berlin

2004

- Focus : Faces Photography, Monika Mohr Galerie, Hamburg, Germany

2005

- Property of a Collector, Photographs Do Not Bend Gallery, Dallas, United States

2006

- Summer in the City 06 – Passion for Fashion!, Galerie Wouter van Leeuwen, Amsterdam, Netherlands
- Nudes Photography, Monika Mohr Galerie, Hamburg, Germany

2007

- Individuals: 20 Portraits from the GAP Collection Herb Ritts, Annie Leibovitz, Albert "Watson", National Portrait Gallery, London

2008

- Fashion – 9 decades of fashion photography, Camera Work, Berlin
- Traum Frauen – 50 Starfotografen zeigen ihre Vision von Schönheit, Haus der Photographie / Deichtorhallen, Hamburg, Germany
- Blind Date Photography, Monika Mohr Galerie, Hamburg, Germany

2009

- Fashion is big, Holden Luntz Gallery, Palm Beach Florida, United States

2010

- Fashion – the story of a lifetime, The Empty Quarter Gallery, Dubai, United Arab Emirates
- A Positive View – The Third Edition, Somerset House, London
- Colleziona 2010, Fondazione FORMA per la Fotografia, Milan, Italy

2011

- Traummänner – Starfotografen zeigen ihre Vision vom Ideal, Haus der Photographie / Deichtorhallen, Hamburg, Germany
- Beauty Culture, The Annenberg Space for Photography, Los Angeles, United States

2012

- Icons of Tomorrow, Christophe Guye Galerie, Zurich, Switzerland
- Timeless beauty, C/O Berlin, Berlin
- Camera Work: Color Photography, Camera Work Gallery, Berlin
- Great photographs: Scape, Hasted kraeutler, New York City
- Modern Masters Hamiltons, London

2013

- High Art: A Decade of Collecting, the Smithsonian, Washington D.C. United States
- Beauty in the 21st Century, Multimedia Art Museum, Moscow, Russia

2014

- Coming into Fashion, Pallais Galliera, Paris

== See also ==
- What Do Artists Do All Day?
