= Oleh Tistol =

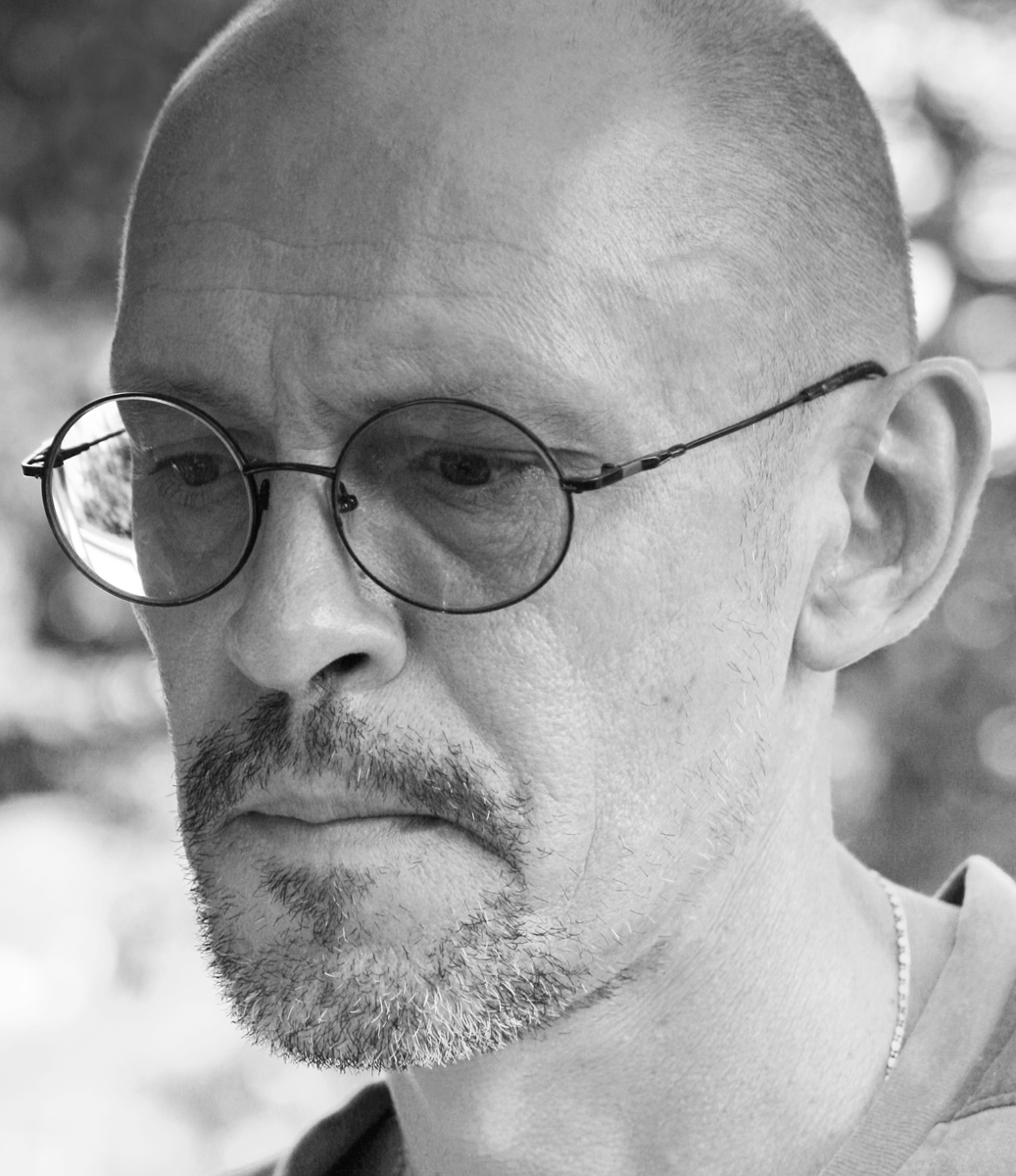
- Oleh Tistol
- Born: August 25, 1960 (age 66); Vradiivka, Mykolaiv Oblast, USSR
- Citizenship: Ukrainian
- Education: Lviv National Academy of Arts
- Occupation: Painter

Oleh Mykhaylovych Tistol (Ukrainian: Олег Михайлович Тiстол, born on 25 August 1960) is a Ukrainian artist, a representative of Ukrainian neo-baroque and one of the leaders of the Ukrainian New Wave.

== Biography ==
Oleh Tistol was born in the urban-type settlement of Vradiivka, Mykolaiv Oblast to scientist-agriculturist Mykhaylo Fedorovych Tistol. In 1970 his mother, Bolharina (Tistol) Valentyna Serhiivna obtains a position of the regional management Head of culture. Oleh moves with his parents to Mykolaiv. He starts his art education in 1972 at the children's art school which has founded in Mykolaiv on his mother's initiative. In 1974 he enters Kiev Republican Art School, the Department of Painting, and moves to Kiev. In 1978-79 he works as a designer in Mykolaiv's Khudfond (Art Foundation). Between 1979–1984 Tistol studies at the Lviv State Institute of Decorative and Applied Arts. In 1984 - 1986 he serves in the Army in military unit Makarov-1 where he gets acquainted with Konstantin (Vinny) Reunov.

In 1988 Oleh married the painter Marina Skugareva.

While the participation in the first Soviet-American exhibition Soviart Oleh Tistol get acquented with the artist Dmitry Kantorov, who invites him to Moscow's squat Furmanny Lane. At the end of 1988 Tistol and Reunov in cooperation with the curator Olga Sviblova start to exhibit their works in Glasgow, Reykjavík, Helsinki. Between 2002–2009 Oleh Tistol works with the curator Olga Lopuhova (The joint retrospective project Khudfond (2009)).

Since 1993 he lives and works in Kyiv.

== Work ==
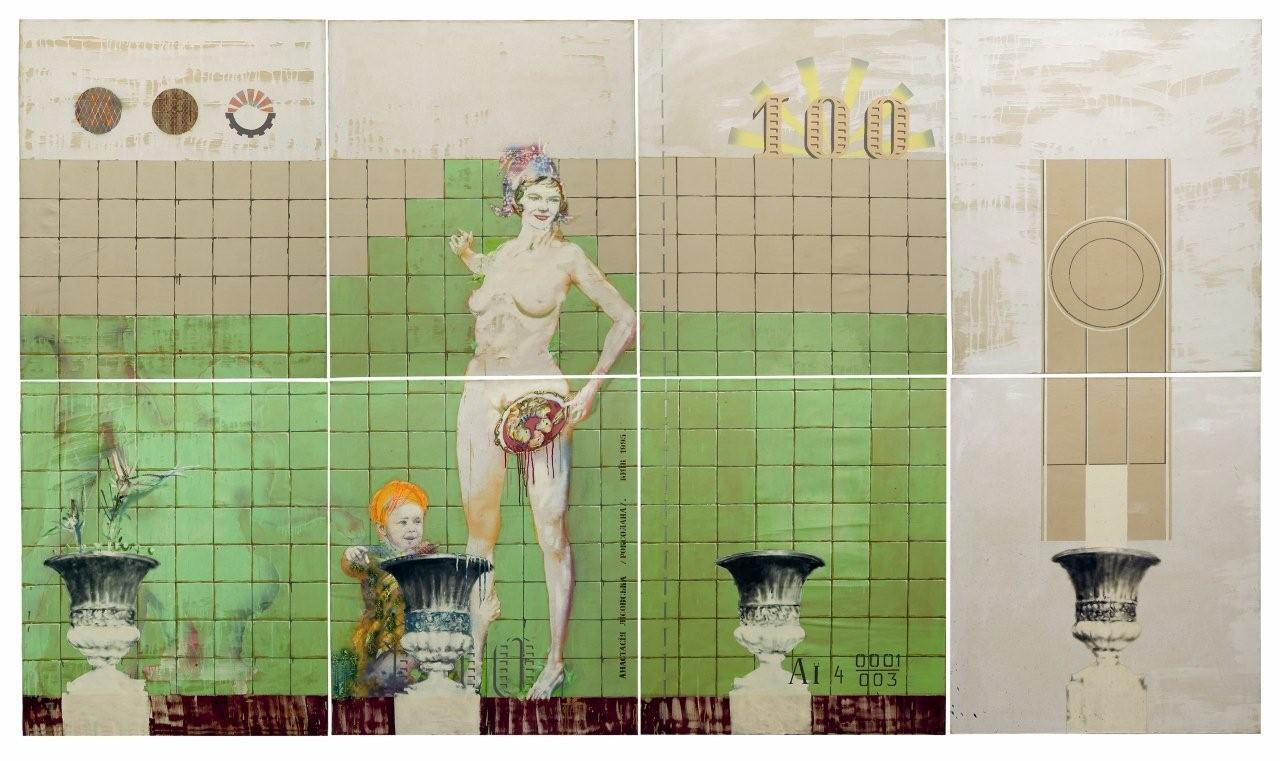
Project of Ukrainian Money. Roxelana. 280х480 cm. Oil on canvas. 1995.

The art of Oleh Tistol (paintings, large-scale installations, photos, sculptures, and art objects) has always been in the center of the artistic process, what is illustrated by his regular participation in the international art events.

Tistol's art, which emerged at the edge of the Soviet and post-Soviet epochs, combined both a critique of Soviet culture with re-evaluation of its clichés, as well as the vital, joyful, and playful atmosphere, which largely defined the appeal of the “Ukrainian new wave”. Combining in his works the national and soviet symbols, myths and utopias he discovered for himself the notion of simulacrum — a copy with no original. Such a paradoxical self-sustainability of propaganda as substitution for the non-existing items unexpectedly unites propaganda with pop-art. Tistol was primarily interested in its formal aesthetic aspects - stencil plates, color back-ups, smoothly painted surfaces.

Oleh Tistol's early works, the large-scale paintings (“Zinovy Bogdan Khmelnitsky” (1988), “Reunification” (1988), “The Farewell of Slavyanka” (1989), “Exercise with Maces” (1989)) demonstrate the main features of the Ukrainian “new wave” — free play with symbols, bright expressive colors, and special “exaggeration” of artistic devices.

In 1987 Oleh Tistol and Konstantin Reunov pronounced the program “A Resolute Edge of National Post-Eclecticism”. Its main idea was the aspiration to outline the national space as a theme for studying, to renew and reconsider the art language, art traditions and foundations of the painting. The national tradition, which is often identified with "Cossack baroque", became the object of research of Ukrainian painters. Domestic mythologicality of the world outlooks, the retrospection of the orientations and the ambiguity of the stereotypes have been represented as a cultural drama, as its traditional features.

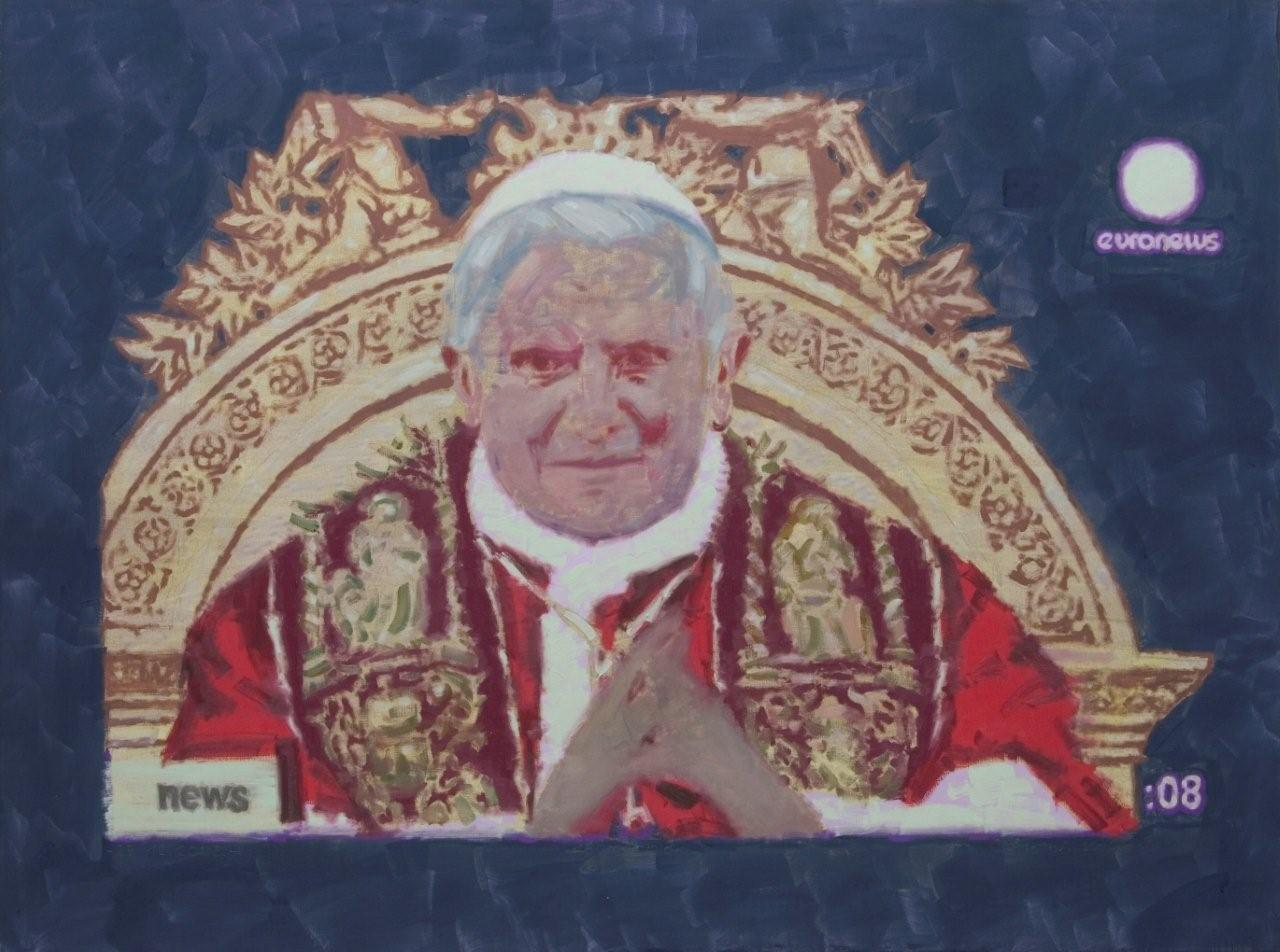
TV + Realism. 25.12.2009. 150х200 cm. Oil on canvas. 2009.

Simultaneously, starting from the middle of the 90s, Oleh Tistol and his fellow artist Mykola Matsenko began to develop the concept of “Natsprom” (“National Industry”), or a study of the national stereotypes fixed in the surrounding environment. Their projects: “The Museum of Atatürk”, “The Museum of Architecture”, “The Museum of Ukraine”, “The Mother of Cities” - which combined painting, photography and art objects - are an example of clarity and adequacy of the concept, as well as strictly determined authors’ position. Architecture appears in this series, as a certain decoration, set capable of providing décor to life performances. At the same time, after having passed through the filters of artistic vision, both famous and ordinary buildings – the embodiment of gone-by styles and social ambitions – appeared as visions and ghosts, that at any moment are ready to relinquish their place to new architectural fantasies. In this way, the artists’ works drew the Ukrainian public’s attention to an important theme of manipulation with historical heritage marked by the popularity of “architectural re-constructions” which fulfilled many Ukrainian cities, having the traditional layouts, with the stylized fake buildings.

The theme of “stereotypes” was continued by Oleh Tistol in his painting series “National Geography” (1998–2004) where he combined “the local” and “the foreign”, the authentic and the borrowed, the ethnic and the global problematic. The sources of this series were the old illustrated magazines with ethnographic photos of “different tribes”. National exoticism was viewed here as the contemporary strategy of “selling local brands in the global market”.

In 2000s, in early 2010s, Oleh Tistol portrayed some of his contemporaries.

Since 2006 Tistol is working on the project “U. B. K.” (the Russian abbreviation for “Southern Coast of Crimea”). Continuing his search for stereotypes, the painter finds them in his everyday life. The principal subject of the project are the palm trees on Yalta's quay. It's also the continuation of the theme "national geography", where Crimea is the symbol of place for holidays, relaxation, paradise. Tistol is attracted by its man-made environment, which transforms the landscape into the part of a culture, as the palm trees are not authentic Crimea's trees, they were planted here in the 20th century, forming its "new stereotype". The different techniques such as photo, painting, drawing, used in "U. B. K.", passed one into another. The project contains the pictorial paintings and the cycles of prints, where the pages of school notebooks, quick notes, casual sketches, supermarket's receipts, bills from the hotels and laundries, letters, the invitations on the passed exhibitions and the air-plane tickets are used as a background.

== Biennials ==
- 2001 - "The First Ukrainian Project" at 49th International exhibition of the modern art in Venice.
- 1996 - Moscow international photobiennial "Interphoto".
- 1994 - "September 17th", 22nd Biennial in São Paulo.

== Collections ==
- PinchukArtCenter, Kyiv, Ukraine.
- Stedelijk Museum, Amsterdam, Netherlands.
- Norton Dodge collection, United States.
- Museum of History of Moscow, Russia.
- Ministry of culture of Turkey, Ankara.
- Fund Christoph Merian Stiftung, Basel, Switzerland.

== Bibliography ==
- Sklyarenko G. "Oleh Tistol's Khudfond- several words about the beauty of stereotypes" (Худфонд Олега Тистола : кое-что о красоте стереотипов) // Books' workshop(Майстерня книги). -2009
- Sklyarenko G. From "Bolotiana Lukroza" to "The Mother of Cities". Architectural fantasies of Oleh Tistol and Mykola Matsenko. (Від "Болотяної Лукрози" до "Матері городов". Архітектурні фантазії Олега Тістола та Миколи Маценко) // Kyiv (Київ), 2006.- №4
- Barbara Bauermeister. The REP of The New Time. (Der Rep Der Neuen Zeit) // Sieter.- 2005.- № 34
- Janet Koplos. Of Walls and Wandering // Art in America, July 1992.
- Jan Hein Sassen. Oleh Tistol // Wanderlieder, Stedelijk Museum, 1991
- Sviblova O. Looking for the happy end. (В поисках счастливого конца) // Source. (Родник)- 1990.- №5(41)
- Akinsha K. Poetics of the surzhik or the Côtelette de Kiev // Decorative art (Декоративное искусство), 1989.- №3
- Larisa Kaszuk. Furmanny Zaulek, Furmanny Lane // Фурманный переулок - Furmanny Zaulek - Furmanny Lane. - Dom Slowa Polskiego.-1989
