= Alexander Abaza (photographer) =

Soviet photographer

Alexander Abaza (1934–2011) was a Soviet photographer. His photographs were exhibited at the Multimedia Art Museum, Moscow in 2005.
