= Marina Skugareva =

Ukrainian artist (born 1962)

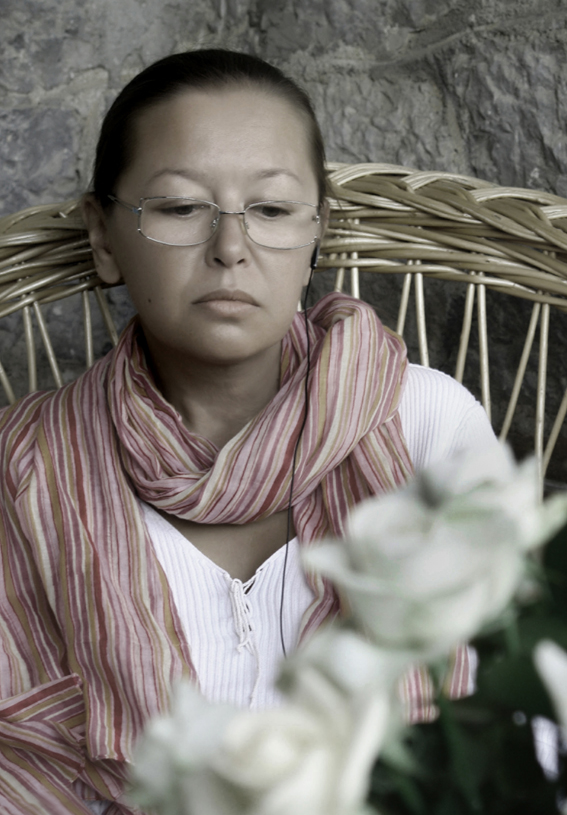
- Born: 2 March 1962; Kyiv, Ukraine
- Education: Lviv National Academy of Arts
- Known for: oil painting
- Movement: contemporary art

Marina Skugareva (Ukrainian: Марина Вадимівна Скугарєва, born 2 March 1962) is a Ukrainian painter, participant of the Ukrainian New Wave in contemporary art.

== Biography ==
She is the daughter of journalist Olha Garitskaya and architect Vadym Skuharev, who was the head of a chair of decorative and applied arts (graphic arts department) at the Dagestan state teacher training institute (Makhachkala, Dagestan ASSR) since 1973.

In 1974 Marina entered Kyiv Republican Art School. In 1981, she graduated from the Dzhemal Dagestan art school. From 1982–1988 she studied at the Lviv State Institute of Decorative and Applied Arts (now Lviv National Academy of Arts), Department of the Art Textiles.

In 1988, she married the painter Oleh Tistol and left for Moscow with him and painters Konstantin Reunov and Yana Bystrova. There they lived and worked in the squat "Furmanny Lane", and later in 'Trehprudny Lane", where the famous "Gallery at Trehprudny Lane" was situated, founded by Konstantin Reunov and Avdey Ter-Oganyan.

In May 1992 Marina Skugareva and Oleh Tistol received grants from the Christoph Merian Stiftung fund within the cultural exchange program and left for Basel, where they lived until 1993. In Switzerland, they participated in several exhibitions with Gia Japaridze and André Clément. The Swiss artists Suzette Beck, Ronald Wüthrich, and Ilse Ermen became good friends of Marina and later even the heroes of her paintings.

Since 1993 Marina Skugareva has lived and worked in Kyiv.

== Work ==
Since the late 1980s, Marina Skugareva has participated regularly in exhibitions of modern art in Kyiv, Moscow, Warsaw, Basel, Berlin, Odense. Her works are the part of a "new wave" - a movement which programmatically attributes its art to a postmodernism, updating the traditional Ukrainian art by its esthetics.

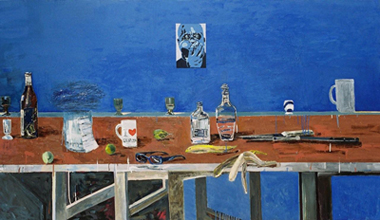
Still life. Radio-gramophone. 80х180 cm. Oil on canvas. 2000.

One of the main themes of Marina Skugareva's art is a naked human figure in space. For the artist this theme emerges from traditions of an expressionism, but Marina's expressions are not only the visible emotions, but also a manner of vision, a search of "another point of view", a way of preservation of "the real present life" in space of the art devastated by infinite citations and reproduction.

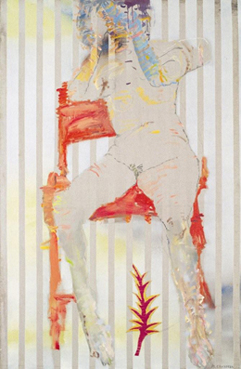
The nudes. Poison Ivy. 160х80cm. Oil on canvas, embroidery, 1992.

Her early works ("Nocturnal Kyiv" (1988), "Der Vogel" (1990), "Poison Ivy" (1992)) are close to transavantgarde painting. In the late ones the expressivity departs, opening up the flood-gates of an accuracy of the statement and a rigid observation. There is a characteristic technique which appears already in Skugareva's first picturesque works—the embroidered fragment—a bird, a flower, a human face. By contributing this feminist tint to her paintings, by uniting embroidery and painting techniques, Marina has united the femininity and the masculinity, the female needlework and figurative concept.

Since the middle of the 1990s Marina Skugareva has been working on the project of still lifes—"Tables". The painter transforms the oblong canvases ("Ronald", "Radio-gramophone", "Evening news"), cut across by the long near-empty tables, with the portraits of characters fixed on a conditional wall above, into the collision of several realities: the interior with the painting is continued in itself and the subjects represented in a picture are tested on reliability, so that glasses and chairs are made to seem more real than portraits.

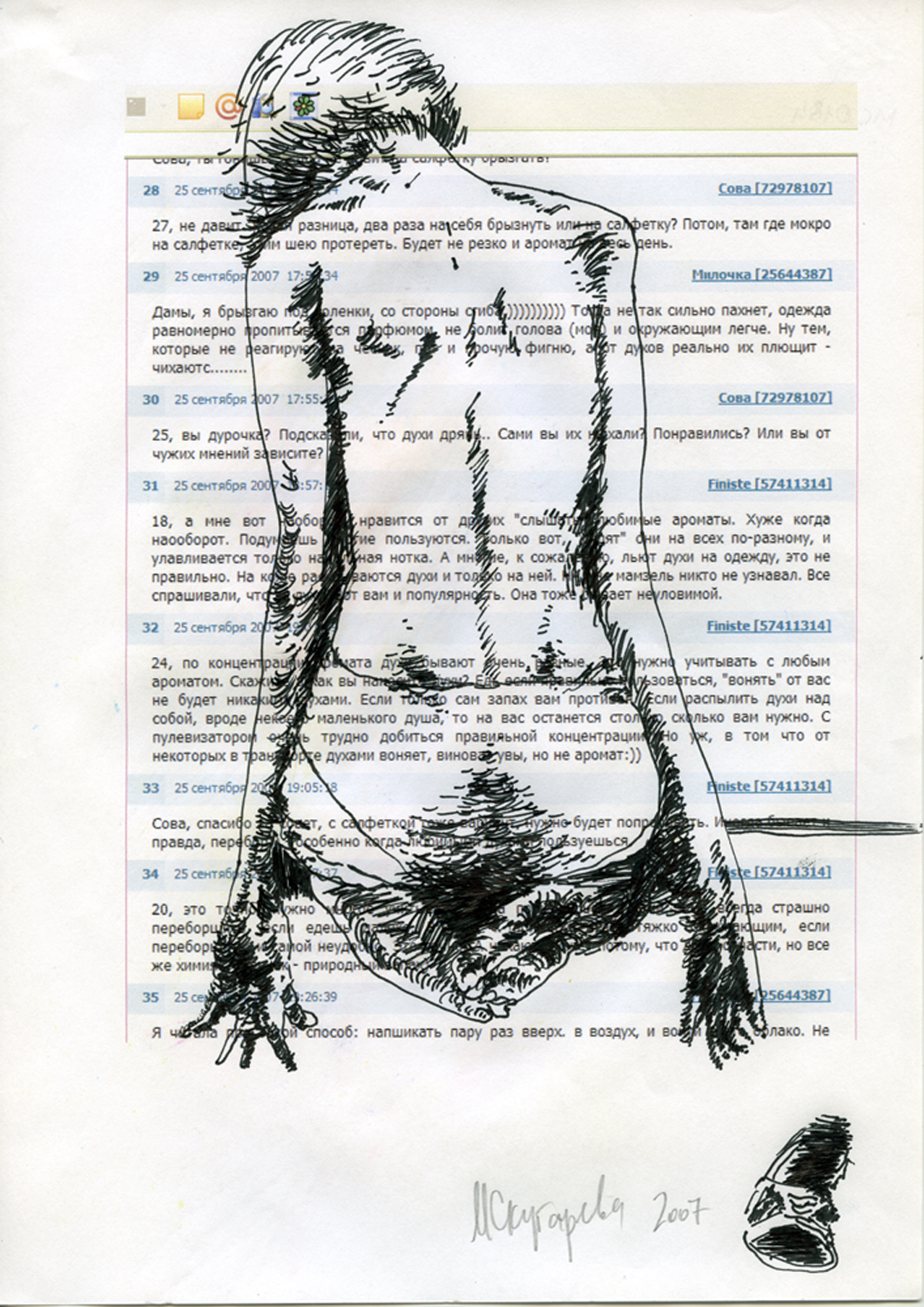
Good Housekeepers. 30×20 cm. Pen on paper. 2009.

"Fragments" is the name of another cycle of painting (2001–2003) which represents a life flared-out in episodes. The underlined fragmentariness and simplicity combine with bright intensity of colour to give a special semantic significance and free figurative breath to these works. Here the artist accents the value of "a private story".

The strange space, where reality is shown from different points of seeing occupied by the artist, characterizes her projects "Landscapes" and "Roads" (2004–2009). Compositions are constructed with a principle of "a sight from car window" or sometimes from a conditional top point of vision. As a consequence of the choice of distance which appears between nature and the person who observes it, nature loses its ingenuous breath being limited by the format of painting. In these paintings there are no human figures; the world is deserted, pointedly passionless, and at the same time sated and multiple-valued.

In 2007 Marina Skugareva presented the project of drawings "Good Housekeepers". It develops the subject of a naked figure in space, detecting new accents. In the majority of drawings Marina uses texts from women's Internet-chats which, being imposed on the naked figures, turn into tattoos. The author's speculative strategy becomes comprehensible through the construction of drawings. The combination of the image and the text is used for "blackouting" the substance and the discrepancy. Texts represent the infinite women's conversations and images fix the forms of a human movement and frozen emotions. For the artiste the subject is just a springboard, she is not poeticizing the daily routine, but is rather gaining a victory over it with the help of art.

== Awards ==
- 1995. Ukraine. The winner of "Great Ukrainian Women Artist".

== Collections ==
- The art museum of Zaporizhzhia, Ukraine
- Moscow House of Photography, Russia
- SK Johnson Kyiv Corp., Ukraine
- Municipal gallery of Odense, Denmark
- Fund Christoph Merian Stiftung, Basel, Switzerland
