= Maxim Grabovenko =

Maxim Ivanovich Grabovenko
- Максим Иванович Грабовенко
- Born: 11 August 1923; Marinovka village, Voznesensk Raion, Mykolaiv Oblast, Soviet Union
- Died: November 12, 1980 (aged 57); Novoalekseevka, Vradiivka Raion, Mykolaiv Oblast, Soviet Union
- Military career
- Allegiance: Soviet Union
- Branch: Red Army
- Service years: 1942–1945
- Rank: Senior sergeant
- Unit: 237th Rifle Division
- Conflicts: World War II; Battle of the Dnieper
- Awards: Hero of the Soviet Union

Maxim Ivanovich Grabovenko (Russian: Максим Иванович Грабовенко; 11 August 1923 – 12 November 1980) was a Ukrainian Red Army senior sergeant and Hero of the Soviet Union. Grabovenko was awarded the title Hero of the Soviet Union and the Order of Lenin for his actions during the Battle of the Dnieper.

== Early life ==
Grabovenko was born on 11 August 1923 in the village of Marinovka in Ananiv Raion in Kherson Oblast to a peasant family. He graduated from the village seven-year secondary school. In 1940, he moved to Novosibirsk and became a carpenter at a construction site. He moved to Stalinsk in early 1941. Grabovenko worked as a carpenter in the construction of the Kuznetsk Metallurgical Combine and the Ordzhonikidze mine.

== World War II ==
In December 1941, Grabovenko was drafted into the Red Army and sent to the 455th Rifle Division, forming in the Kemerovo Oblast. The division soon was renamed the 237th Rifle Division. In April 1942, he was transferred along with the division to Vologda in the Arkhangelsk Military District. In July 1942, the division was sent into combat during the Battle of Voronezh. In January 1943, he fought in the Voronezh-Kastornoye Operation. In February and March, he fought in the Third Battle of Kharkov. During July and August, he fought in the Battle of Kursk.

From August, the division fought in the Battle of the Dnieper. By this time, Grabovenko was a gunner in the division's 691st Artillery Regiment. He was awarded the Medal "For Courage" on 14 August. On 25 September, his battery was involved in fighting near Grebeni village in Kaharlyk Raion. On 28 September, Grabovenko helped repulse 3 German counterattacks against the Dnieper bridgehead for 10 hours. During the fighting, he was wounded but reportedly did not leave the guns. Despite the German troops sometimes being as close as 60 to 100 meters to the guns, Grabovenko reportedly continued to fight and killed numerous German soldiers. Grabovenko fired the guns until he ran out of shells, then fought with his personal weapon. He was wounded, but reportedly did not leave the frontline. For his actions, Grabovenko was awarded the title Hero of the Soviet Union and the Order of Lenin on 24 December. In 1944, he joined the Communist Party of the Soviet Union.

== Postwar ==
In 1945, Grabovenko was demobilized. He lived in the village of Novooleksiyivka in Vradiivka Raion. Grabovenko worked as the head of the Pobeda collective farm. He later became the head of the collective farm's apiary. Grabovenko was killed in an accident on 12 November 1980. He was buried in Novoaleksiyivka.
