= Aryeh Leib Schochet =

Rabbi Aryeh Leib Schochet (Hebrew: אריה לייב שוחט) was a Ukrainian rabbi who emigrated to the United States in 1906. He published a book on Hasidic philosophy titled Lekutim Yekarim.

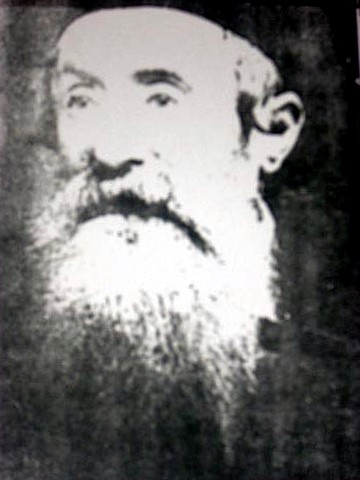
Rabbi Aryeh Leib Schochet

== Biography ==
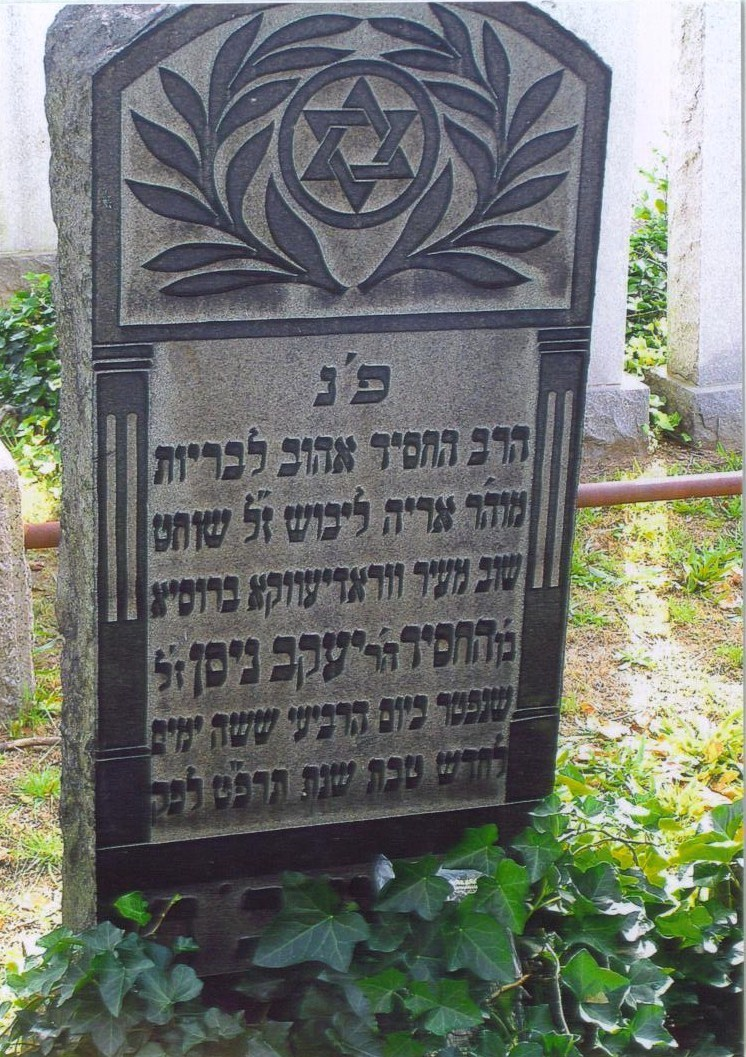
Tombstone of Rabbi Aryeh Leib Schochet in Old Montefiore Cemetery, Queens, New York.

Aryeh Leib was born in Balta, now in Ukraine in 1845. His mother Tziporah was the daughter of Rabbi Yoseph Zev Wolf Segal of Balta, his father was Yaakov Nissan. He grew up in a town mostly occupied by Chasidim of Rabbi Refoel of Bershad, though he was a student of Rabbi Dovid Twersky of Tolna and Rabbi Yitzchok Yoel Rabinowitz of Kantikaziva.

In his book, he related how his uncle Reuven Wolf Segal took care of Rabbi Shmuel Avraham Abba Shapiro of Slavuta, while he recuperated from being lashed 1,500 times by the Russian government. Avraham and his brother Pinchas Shapiro, both grandchildren of Rabbi Pinchas of Koritz, were the owners of the Slavuta printing house, which had been founded by their father, Rabbi Moshe Shapiro. As was common, the text of published books had to be edited so that they had nothing negative about the government. The brothers were accused of not having the proper censorship license, their printing house was shut down, and they were sent to Siberia.

Aryeh Leib became rabbi of the Ukrainian town of Vradiivka in Mykolaiv Oblast, near the southern border of modern Ukraine.

== Emigration ==
In August 1906, he emigrated to the United States with his son Abraham, after Abraham was drafted into the Russian army. He settled in the Brownsville section of Brooklyn, New York. He published his book Lekutim Yekarim in 1926. The book included approbations of several contemporary New York rabbis including Rabbis Dovid Mordechai Twersky of Tolan and Rabbi Yehoshua Heschel Rabinowitz of Manestrich.

Aryeh Leib died in his Brooklyn home on Stone Avenue on December 19, 1928, and was buried in Old Montefiore Cemetery in Springfield Gardens, Queens.
