= Vradiivka =

Rural locality in Mykolaiv Oblast, Ukraine

Vradiivka Врадіївка
- Rural settlement
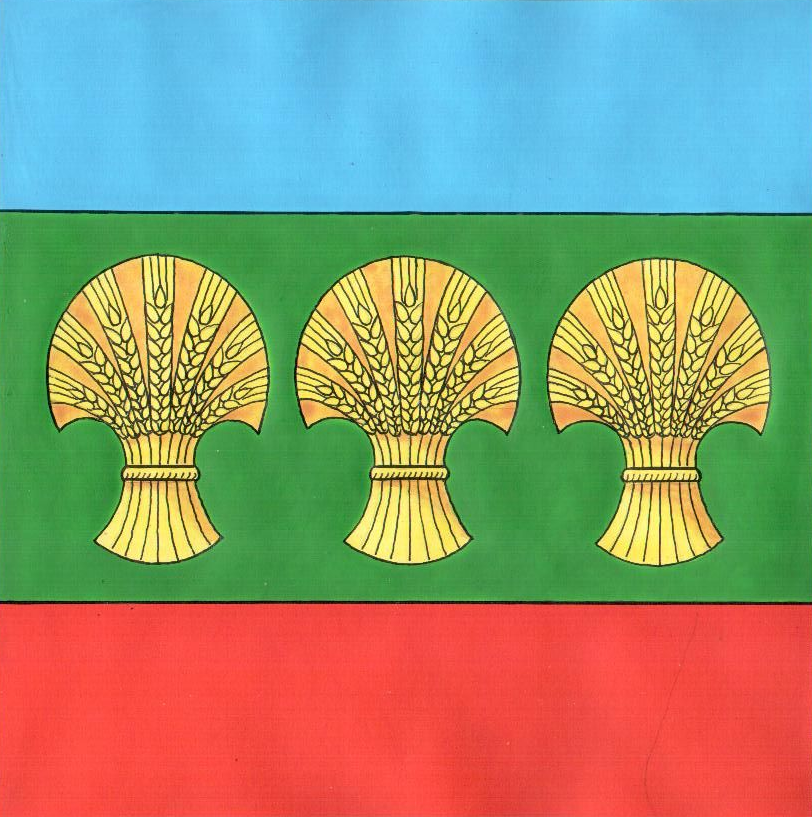
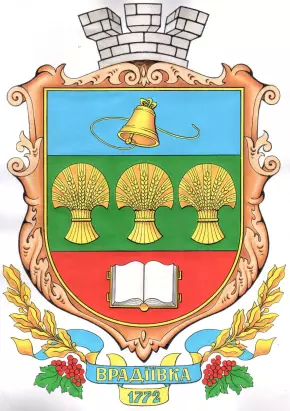
- Flag Coat of arms

- Location within Mykolaiv Oblast Location within Ukraine
- Coordinates: 47°51′42″N 30°35′35″E
- Country: Ukraine
- Oblast: Mykolaiv Oblast
- Raion: Pervomaisk Raion

Population (2022)
  - Total: 7,956

Vradiivka (Ukrainian: Врадіївка; Russian: Врадиевка) is a rural settlement in Pervomaisk Raion, Mykolaiv Oblast, Ukraine. It hosts the administration of Vradiivka settlement hromada, one of the hromadas of Ukraine. Until 1964 the settlement was known as Velyka Vradiivka. Population: 7,956 (2022 estimate).

Vradiivka is located on the right bank of the Kodyma, a right tributary of the Southern Bug.

== History ==
Aryeh Leib Schochet, a Chassidic scholar, became a rabbi in Vradiivka in the 19th century.

In the 1920s, the current area of the district belonged to Odessa Governorate. In 1923, uyezds in Ukrainian Soviet Socialist Republic were abolished, and the governorates were divided into okruhas. In 1923, Velyka Vradiivka Raion with the administrative center in Vradiivka was established. It belonged to Pervomaisk Okruha. In 1925, the governorates were abolished, and okruhas were directly subordinated to Ukrainian SSR. In 1930, okruhas were abolished, and on 27 February 1932, Odessa Oblast was established, and Velyka Vradiivka was included into Odessa Oblast. In February 1954, Velyka Vradiivka Raion was transferred to Mykolaiv Oblast. In January 1963, during the abortive Khrushchyov administrative reform, Velyka Vradiivka Raion was abolished and merged into Kryve Ozero Raion. In 1964, Velyka Vradiivka was renamed Vradiivka. On 8 December 1966 Vradiivka Raion with the administrative center in Vradiivka was established on the lands previously belonging to Kryve Ozero Raion. In 1967, Vradiivka was granted urban-type settlement status.

On 18 July 2020, Vradiivka Raion was abolished as part of the administrative reform of Ukraine, which reduced the number of raions of Mykolaiv Oblast to four. The area of Vradiivka Raion was merged into Pervomaisk Raion. On 26 January 2024, a new law entered into force which abolished the status of urban-type settlement status, and Vradiivka became a rural settlement.

=== Vradiivka rape ===
In June 2013, a rape of a local resident by policemen caused riots in Vradiivka and nationwide, after the authorities initially failed to charge the perpetrators.

On 26 June 2013, two police officers and a taxi driver raped Iryna Krashkova in Vradiivka and then tried to kill her. The victim survived but with severe injuries. Originally, only one police officer and the taxi driver were arrested. As a result, on 1 July 2013 hundreds of angry protesters stormed the district police department and demanded the arrest of the second officer, who was detained soon after. All three men were sentenced to prison. Since then, "Vradiivka has become a symbol for protests against police crimes and the arbitrariness of the justice system".

== Transportation ==
Vradiivka railway station in the settlement has connections to Pervomaisk and Podilsk.

== Personalities ==
- Oleh Tistol, Ukrainian artist, born in Vradiivka
