= Rise up, Ukraine! =

2013 Ukrainian protests

- Part of Prelude to Euromaidan
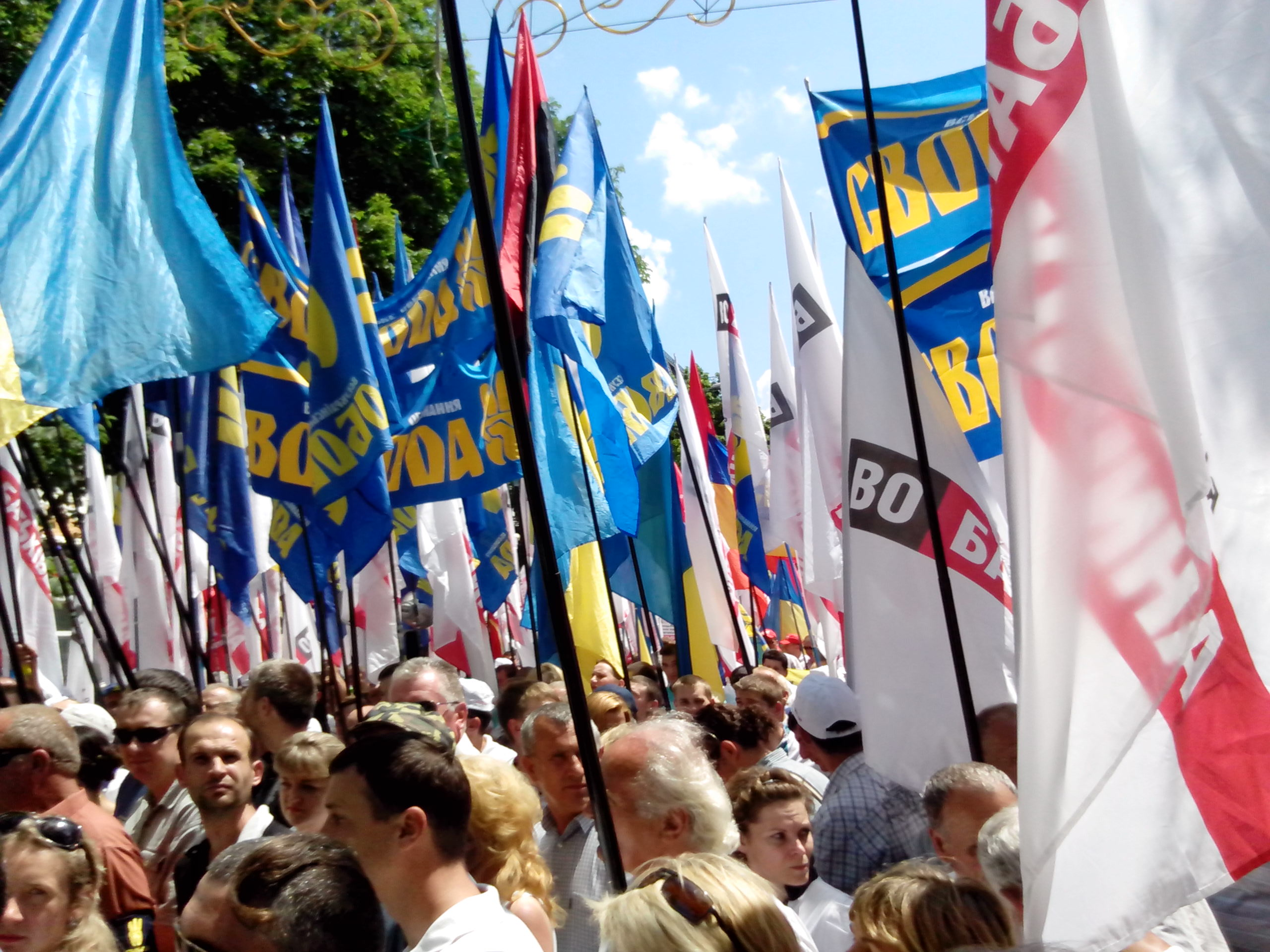
- Protesters in Kyiv, June 2013
- Date: 14 March – 24 August 2013
- Location: Kyiv, Ukraine
- Goals: Oust then-president Viktor Yanukovych
- Methods: Peaceful demonstrations (marches, rallies, picketing, etc)
- Result: Protests failed, largely as a result of suppression by Titushky

Parties
"Rise up, Ukraine!" supporters	Government of Ukraine Kyiv City Government Militsiya Titushky	"In Europe without fascism" supporters

Lead figures
Arseniy Yatsenyuk; Vitaliy Klychko; Oleh Tyahnybok	Vitaliy Zakharchenko	Oleksandr Yefremov

Units involved
civil population	BRDM-2; Berkut units sports athletes	civil population

Number
30,000+	4,000 (militsiya); 70–80 (athletes)	4,500+

Casualties and losses
5+		

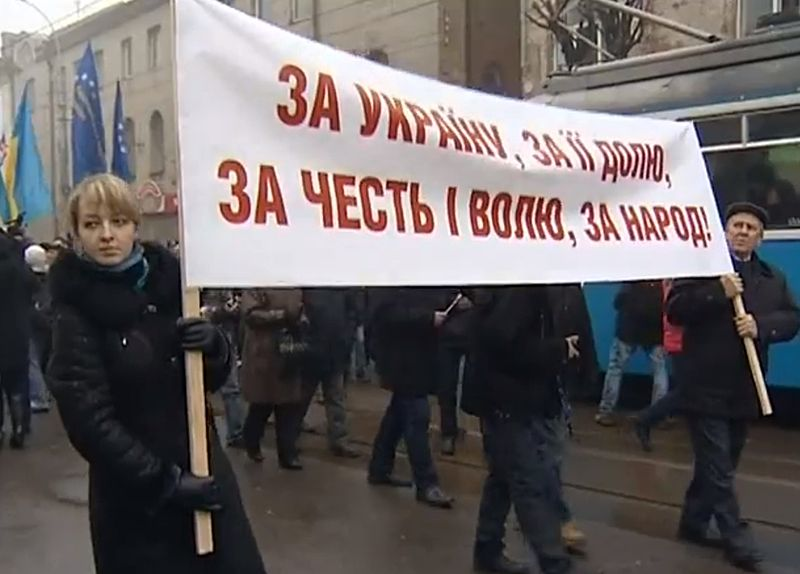
"Rise up, Ukraine!" demonstrations in Vinnytsia

"Rise up, Ukraine!" (Ukrainian: "Повстань, Україно!", romanized: "Povstan, Ukraino!", Russian: "Вставай, Украина!") was a nationwide series of political protests by opposition parties All-Ukrainian Union "Fatherland", UDAR and All-Ukrainian Union "Svoboda" against the government of the former Ukrainian President Viktor Yanukovych that commenced on 14 March 2013. It was intended as a two-month campaign to end on 18 May 2013 in Kyiv. But the provisional final date was initially from May 2013 postponed to 24 August 2013, Independence Day of Ukraine. In June 2013 the organisers claimed that no final end of the protest had been set.

== Kyiv protest ==
A campaign against the government of president of Ukraine Viktor Yanukovych took place on May 18, 2013. The event was initially prepared by the country's political opposition parties and number of civil movements as a culmination point to depose the president of Ukraine. Since then the protest in Kyiv however transformed into a preliminary final, while the new provisional final date was postponed to August 24, 2013, the Independence Day.

The Kyiv protest grew into a mass national scandal between a number of journalists and the parliamentary opposition deputies who tried to prove that authorities provoked disorder in the capital using armored military vehicles and sports athletes and the country's ruling party that denied any allegations and blaming everything on the opposition.

The marches were estimated to have 20,000 to 30,000 participants.

== Preparations ==
The Kyiv events of May 18, the Europe Day in Ukraine, should have been a conclusion of the ongoing national campaign "Rise up, Ukraine!" that started on March 14, 2013. During the demonstrations the parliamentary opposition was supposed to announce the joint candidate to the 2015 presidential elections.

On May 16, 2013 the Kyiv City State Administration approved to hold both rallies, one led by the Party of Regions as "Into Europe without fascism" and another led by a coalition of opposition parliamentary parties as part of "Rise up, Ukraine!" campaign. As the start of the event drew close the members of parliamentary opposition were complaining that the authorities were impeding arrival of the event willing participants that were coming to Kyiv.

Along with the main political demonstrations that day in Kyiv were scheduled a lot of other public events. For example, the Social-Patriotic Assembly of Slavs planned to conduct a march "Ukraine - above all else" before noon, the Kyiv City State Administration authorities planned the opening of the European Village with participation of the Ambassador of the European Union Jan Tombiński and Minister of Foreign Affairs Leonid Kozhara. Also that day were supposed to take place Ice Cream Festival, cycling and motor trials with participation of sports vehicles, the International football festival "Great Ball" and many more.

=== "Rise up, Ukraine!" route ===
The demonstration "Rise up, Ukraine!" was scheduled to take place from 10:00 in the morning to 19:00 in the evening starting at the European Square. The Kyiv City Administration managed to find agreement with the All-Ukrainian Union Fatherland to leave the European Square by 12:15 in the afternoon and asked the Party of Regions not to start any events at the same square before 13:00.

"A group of athletic men in tracksuits" assaulted attendees of the "Rise up, Ukraine!" march and journalists.

=== "In Europe without fascism" route ===
The demonstration of Party of Regions which the party had called "anti-fascist demonstration" was planned to take place from 9:00 to 15:00 o'clock starting at the Memorial Complex "Museum of the Great Patriotic War 1941-1945" and finishing at the European Square. Participants of the rally ‘To Europe Without Fascists’ received compensation from Party of Regions "for the bus and daily expenses".

Earlier that spring more "Joining Europe without Fascists!" marches and "gathering" under the auspices of the Party of Regions were held. The 18 May 2013 march was meant as "final anti-fascist rally" of a "nationwide four-day meeting". According to press reports public employees had been ordered to attend the marches and gatherings.

The Jewish organisations Congress of the National Communities of Ukraine and the Association of Jewish Organizations and Communities have spoken out against the "Joining Europe without Fascists!" marches; calling them "aimed primarily to discredit the political opposition".

== Demonstrations and rallies ==
Both rallies started to gather at the European Square on 18 May 2013 at 11:30. The rally of opposition eventually was supposed to march onto the Sofia Square (Sofiiska Ploshcha).

Highlights

- Military vehicle blocked
- Participation of hostile civilians (athletes) in cooperation with militsiya
- Passive actions from militsiya on demands of demonstrators to stop violence, allowing a civil disorder

== Legacy ==
The term Titushky (unofficial pro-government mercenaries), much used during the 2013-2014 Euromaidan, derived from an attack by Vadym Titushko on Channel Five journalists in Kyiv on 18 May 2013.

== See also ==
- Vradiivka protests - took place simultaneously with the campaign
- Ukraine without Kuchma
- Orange Revolution
- Euromaidan
- List of protests in the 21st century
