= Titushky =

Mercenary support agents of the Ukrainian police force

Titushky at the Cabinet of Ministers of Ukraine, November 24, 2013

The Titushky (plural; Ukrainian: тітушки; Russian: титушки, romanized: titushki; Romanian: titușki; Georgian: ტიტუშკები, romanized: t’it’ushk’ebi) are mercenary agents in Ukraine who support the Ukrainian regime's security services during the administration of Viktor Yanukovych, often posing as street hooligans in sports clothing with the purpose of serving as provocateurs at pro-European and anti-Yanukovych political rallies that would incite violence in order to get protestors arrested. Their role grew more prominent in the wake of Euromaidan, where they were involved in numerous clashes and acts of violence during the movement. The concept of Titushky also exists outside of Ukraine throughout Central and Eastern Europe, where the term became synonymous with the ruling regimes' informal, violent enforcers.

In the early 2010s, a Titushky raid (Russian: титушки рейд, romanized: titushki reyd) was a widely used slang term in both Ukrainian and the Russian spoken in Ukraine to describe street beatings, carjackings, and kidnappings by unidentified men in civilian clothes from behind the lines of political rallies. Titushky were employed by the Yanukovych government, reportedly receiving 200 hryvnia to $100 per day in payments. Some were also suspected of being illegal formations of combat troops carrying concealed pistols. They carried out intimidation and dispersal of anti-government demonstrations, and attacked participants and representative of the news media.

Titushky adopted the strategy of blending into a peaceful crowd or mob and then instigating a violent fight, which led to arrests of peaceful protesters on the grounds of mass disorder; the perpetrators were then used either as witnesses of the supposed crime, or as victims. During Euromaidan in 2013–2014, they became a collective term for agents provocateurs and thugs, who were hired by the Party of Regions and law enforcement agents in civilian clothing. Supporters of President Yanukovych also used the term titushky to refer to pro-opposition thugs.

== Etymology ==
The term Titushky derives from the surname of Vadym Titushko (Ukrainian: Вадим Тітушко, Russian: Вадим Титушко), also known as Vadik “Rumyn” (Ukrainian: Вадiк «Румин», Russian: Вадик «Румын», Romanian: Vadik "Românul"), meaning Vadik 'the Romanian', a mixed martial artist from Bila Tserkva who attacked Channel Five journalists on May 18, 2013, during the Rise up, Ukraine! opposition rally. He and two other men received suspended sentences over the attack. Titushko said he was unhappy to have his name associated with thugs, and that he supported the anti-government Euromaidan protests. In his interview, Titushko asserted that he was hired to protect the opposition rally and that he tried to remove a woman from harm's way, from amid a melee.

Radio Liberty described titushky as "burly guys dressed in sports wear who act as agents provocateurs. They crack down on protesters or provoke clashes with the aim of tarnishing peaceful protests".

== Activity ==
In January 2014, a former head of the Security Service of Ukraine, General Palivoda, stated "Titushki are actively used by the government in local standoffs with people. These are groups of provocateurs who get paid and these are mostly people without steady moral principles and very poor people who desperately need some money. They are not bandits nor prisoners nor criminals. Often they don't even know who gathered them and what they will have to do. They understand what they got involved in only after they find themselves in the middle of some action." However, Vyacheslav Veremiy, a Vesti Reporter journalist traveling to Euromaidan, was pulled out of his car by a Titushky squad and shot to death point-blank from a concealed gun, indicating more than just a happenstance action. Veremiy's killing was confirmed on Wednesday 19 February 2014 at 6.45 am.

According to What's On magazine, Titushky openly fired live ammunition on 18 February 2014, resulting in the death of at least one protester at the scene near the Supreme Court building in Kyiv. On the same day, some 200 Titushky men, dressed as Maidan defence units with green helmets and shields, joined Berkut troops and beat protesters on Velyka Zhytomyrska street using bats and iron pipes. Titushky also blocked a polling station in Mykolaiv during the presidential election amidst pro-Russian unrest in Ukraine in the early stages of the Russo-Ukrainian War, on 25 May 2014.

== Ititushky ==
In 2013, the word ititushky or ititushkas (pronounced ajtitushky) (Ukrainian: айтітушки, Russian: айтитушки) quickly appeared in the Myslovo (Ukrainian: Мислово) dictionary of modern Ukrainian slang, and also soon became a widespread term in the Russian used in Ukraine. A portmanteau of the words IT and titushka, it refers to a hacker or an ordinary user who acted aggressively against pro-Euromaidan blogs and websites, using DDoS attacks, aggressive comments, or trolling.

== Similar groups ==
Piotr Siuda (Russian: Пётр Сиуда, 1937 – May 1990), a victim and volunteer of Novocherkassk massacre who had investigated it in 1980s had reported that, at the time, Soviet Militia in his own city of Novocherkassk used semi-legal groups of ex-convicts to hunt down and beat up political activists and dissent. Siuda himself was killed under suspicious circumstances.

=== Georgia ===
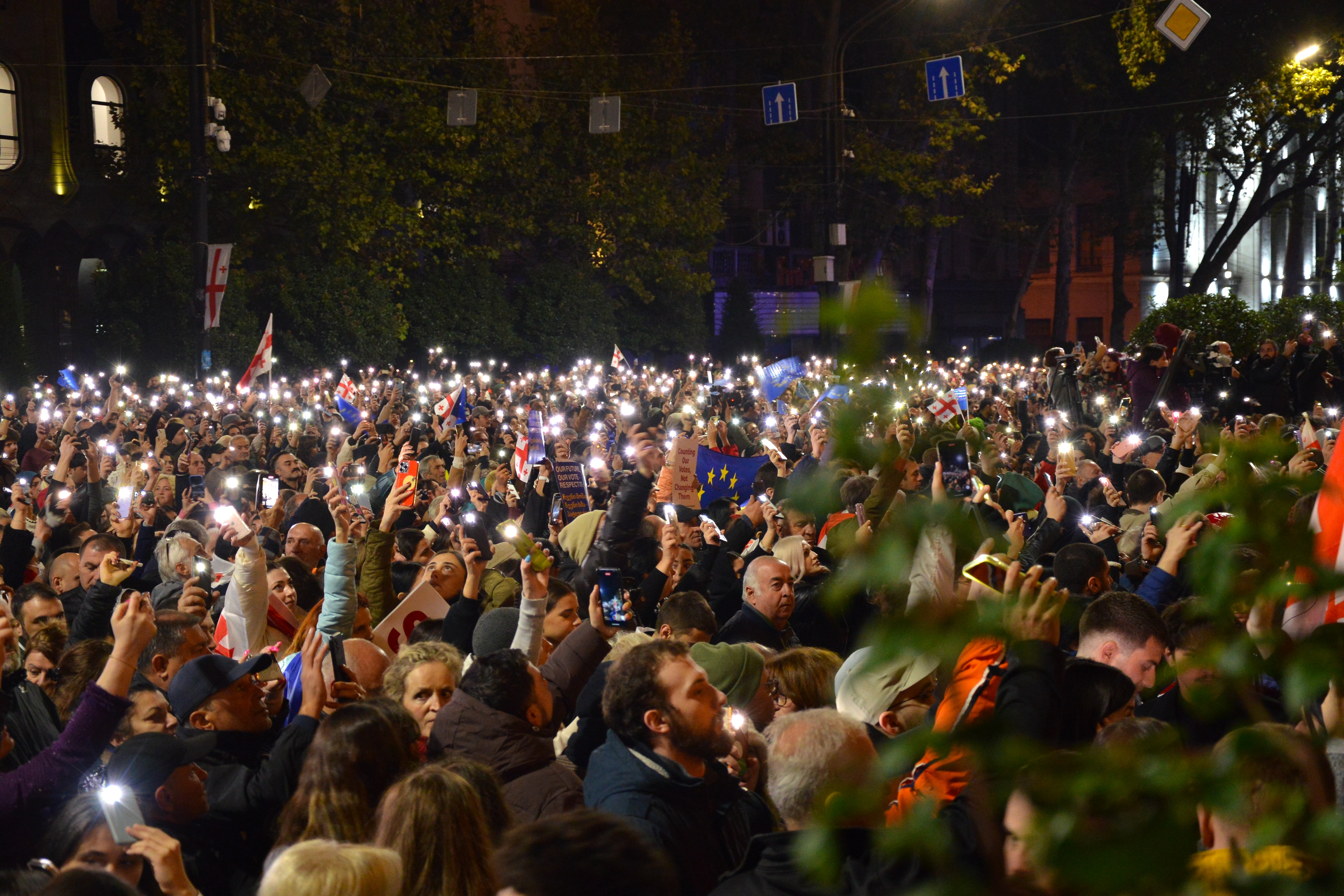
Georgian pro-European Union demonstrations, which have been targeted by Titushky

In 2024, Georgia's euroscepticist ruling party Georgian Dream used Titushky against political opponents extensively, drawing parallels with Yanukovich's administration in Ukraine.

During the 2023–2024 Georgian protests, opposition offices were attacked by Titushky. A number of opponents of the government's proposed "foreign agents law", including political and civil figures were ambushed, attacked, and severely beaten by Titushky.

In the course of the 2024–2025 Georgian protests, Titushky were used to physically attack journalists critical of the government, as well as political opponents of the ruling party.

=== Hungary ===
The Hungarian government under Prime Minister Viktor Orbán reportedly used Titushky methods against protesters ahead of the 2026 Hungarian parliamentary election, including coordinated groups of men dressed in black accompanying Orbán’s campaign tour who were involved in obstructing protesters, drowning out criticism and removing or covering banners. Opposition leader Peter Magyar also describing pro-Fidesz counter-protesters as "Titushky".

=== Poland ===
In Poland, in late 70s individuals who were working on behalf of the Polish Ministry of Public Security were often termed as Polish: Nieznani sprawcy, lit. 'Unknown perpetrators', (see Nieznani sprawcy (poland euphemism)) who were tasked with terrorizing and murdering dissidents, Catholics, and keeping in check workers, often with impunity. The murder of Stanisław Pyjas, a student at the time, is a well known case of illegal sprawcy activity.

The Law and Justice government in Poland was accused of using "Titushky" during the 2020–2021 women's strike protests in Poland, after Deputy Prime Minister Jarosław Kaczyński called for the mobilization of nationalist counter-protesters. A "Catholic self-defence” force organised by Robert Bąkiewicz had its members physically remove protesters during this period.

=== Serbia ===
In Serbia, such persons are often referred to as "batinaši" (beaters). During the 2017 presidential inauguration of Aleksandar Vučić, tattooed, muscular men in civilian clothing forcefully removed several journalists and photographers from the open air ceremony, by performing choking maneuvers on them in public.

During the 2024–present Serbian anti-corruption protests, the Serbian government arranged for muscular young men, mostly dressed in baseball caps and hoodies, to stand guard in Pioneers Park, next to the office of the President of Serbia; these men were filmed provoking and attacking other people and are referred to as "ćaci".

=== Slovenia ===
During the 2020–2022 Slovenian protests, self-proclaimed patriotic groups referred to as "rumeni jopiči" (yellow vests) were involved in obstructing an alternative national celebration. These groups received praise and public support from Prime Minister Janez Janša and his Slovenian Democratic Party.

== See also ==
- Baltagiya
- Colectivo (Venezuela)
- Paramilitary
- Plainclothes law enforcement — police officers, militia members, or soldiers disguised in civilian clothes
- Rubbish Collection Organization (Thailand)
- Shabiha (Syria)
- Triad (organised crime)#Chinese government connections
- Undercover operation
