= Murder of Oksana Makar =

2012 murder in Ukraine

- Date: March 8, 2012
- Location: Mykolaiv, Ukraine
- Outcome: Rape and murder of Oksana Makar
- Deaths: Oksana Makar
- Injuries: Strangulation, burns, smoke inhalation
- Burial: March 30, 2012
- Suspects: Yevhen Krasnoshchok; Artem Pohosian; Maksym Prysiazhniuk
- Charges: Rape and murder

The murder of Oksana Makar took place in March 2012 in Ukraine, garnering extensive media coverage both at home and abroad and leading to mass protests. Oksana Makar, aged 18, was attacked by three men in the city of Mykolaiv on 8 March 2012: she was raped, strangled, set alight and left to die, though she survived another three weeks after being taken to hospital. Her case became a cause célèbre in Ukraine when only one of the attackers was charged by the police. The other two, whose parents were reported to be former government officials, were released on police bail, allegedly because of the personal connections of their parents. They were later rearrested after a public outcry, and mass protests on 13 March. Protests demanding justice, to gather funds and encourage blood donations continued after the arrest as well.

== People involved in the case ==
=== Oksana Makar ===
Oksana Serhiyivna Makar (Ukrainian: Оксана Сергіївна Макар, Russian: Оксана Сергеевна Макар, 11 June 1993 – 29 March 2012) spent a significant part of her childhood in an orphanage after both her father and her stepfather were imprisoned for dealing drugs and her mother was convicted of robbery and sentenced to three years. She completed only six years of schooling, ran away from the orphanage, and lived by herself at various locations being abandoned by her parents and engaged in petty theft and prostitution from the age of 11.

=== Yevhen Krasnoshchok ===
Yevhen Krasnoshchok (the main suspect) left home at 17, and worked in various low ranking jobs. He lived in a hostel with his wife and two-year-old daughter. Krasnoshchok has remained in police custody since his arrest on 11 March 2012.

=== Maksym Prysiazhniuk ===
Maksym Prysiazhniuk worked as a lawyer in the Department of Culture for the Mykolaiv City Council. His adopted mother was a head of the Yelanets District council prior to her retirement in 2009 (Yelanets is located 60 miles from Mykolaiv). Prysiazhniuk was arrested on 11 March 2012, released on police bail and rearrested following public protests by Femen. Prisyazhnyuk had been a member of the youth wing of the Party of Regions, but had been expelled from their ranks in 2010. Prysiazhniuk then continued his political career as a member of the United Centre but, according to that party, he had never been a member and had only worked with them on a voluntary basis during the 2010 local elections.

=== Artem Pohosian ===
It was initially reported that Artem Pohosian's father worked in the past as a senior official in the district prosecutor's office in Mykolaiv. According to the police his father worked as a manual laborer and died in January 2012 and his mother is a librarian. Pohosian was arrested on 11 March 2012, released on police bail, and rearrested following public protests.

== Attack ==
Makar, aged 18, was attacked by three men, in Mykolaiv in Southern Ukraine on the night of 8–9 March 2012. There are conflicting accounts on the details of how the suspects and victim knew each other and what occurred on the evening of the murder, but it is not disputed that Makar met at least two of her attackers in the Rybka, a pub in Mykolaiv, and they all went to an apartment belonging to one of the alleged attackers. It has been alleged that Prysiazhniuk knew Makar before they met on 8 March and planned the crime although this has been denied by Makar's mother. Three men raped Makar at the apartment and attempted to strangle her with a cord. After that, they took Makar who was barely conscious, moved her to a nearby construction site, wrapped her in a blanket and set her on fire that was burning during the whole night. She was discovered the next morning, still conscious, by a passing motorist and taken to a hospital. She had suffered burns to 55 percent of her body and received lung damage due to smoke inhalation.

== Medical response and death ==
Makar was transferred to the Donetsk Burn Center, a modern medical institution with an international reputation where a Swiss surgeon operated on her. Her right arm and both of her feet had to be amputated to stop gangrene from spreading.

On 29 March 2012, Makar died from her injuries. She was buried on 30 March in Luch. Since she died unmarried, she was buried in a wedding dress, in accordance with local tradition.

== Investigation and trial ==
Three men – Yevhen Krasnoshchok, 23, Maksym Prysiazhniuk, 24, and Artem Pogasyan, 22 – were arrested on 11 March, but Prysiazhniuk and Pohosian were released on police bail. Shortly thereafter it was claimed in the media that the parents of Prysiazhniuk and Pohosian were ex-government officials from the Mykolaiv area and were connected to local politicians. It was reported that Prysiazhniuk is the adopted son of a former head of district council and Pohosian is the son of the regional prosecutor. (In their statement the police have confirmed the claim in respect of Prysiazhniuk but stated that Pohosian's mother is a librarian and his father was a manual laborer before his death in January 2012.) After protests on the streets of Mykolaiv and other cities against the police bail of Prysiazhniuk and Pohosian, Ukrainian President Viktor Yanukovych intervened and an investigating team from Kyiv, Ukraine's capital, then visited Mykolaiv. The two suspects released on police bail were re-arrested, and at least four local law-enforcement officials were sacked. On 29 March, a Ministry of Internal Affairs spokesman announced that all three men had been charged with Oksana Makar's rape and murder and faced life in jail.

On May 24, 2012, an open court trial on the case began at Mykolaiv's Tsentralnyi Raion court. During the trial Prysiazhniuk claimed that the sex with Makar was on mutual consent. He and Pohosian claimed that it was Krasnoshchok who smothered the girl and then raped her again; Prysiazhniuk and Pohosian believed she was already dead when they carried her to the basement. On 30 October 2012 the prosecutor called for a life sentence for Krasnoshchok, 15 years of imprisonment for Prysiazhniuk and 14 years of imprisonment for Pohosian. On 27 November 2012, the court, in its ruling, found the defendants guilty and sentenced Krasnoshchok to life imprisonment, Prysiazhniuk to 15 years in prison, and Pohosian to 14 years in prison. In the aftermath of the sentencing, Makar's family lawyer said that he would appeal in order to try and get life sentences for all three instead of just Krasnoshchok, while Prysiazhniuk and Pohosian's lawyers said they would appeal for a lighter sentence.

In April 2013, in one of the first attempts for an appeal, Maksym Prysiazhniuk's lawyer announced that he would try to get the case reconsidered via the Mykolaiv Court of Appeal. In May 2013, after just over a month, the court issued a decision agreeing with the initial judgment, ruling not to overturn the case. In June 2014, the High Specialized Court of Ukraine for Civil and Criminal Cases upheld the sentences for the second time. In March 2019, Krasnoshchok attempted to get his case overturned on the basis that the confessions he made were forced under duress by police officers during the pre-trial investigation. In August 2019, the Central District Court of Mykolaiv refused to listen to Krasnoshchok's case. As of 2025, Krasnoshchok is serving his sentence in Zaporizhzhia Oblast, Prysiazhniuk in Dnipropetrovsk Oblast, while Krasnoshchok was still in the pre-trial detention centre of Mykolaiv but was being proposed to be transferred to a maximum security prison.

== Public response ==
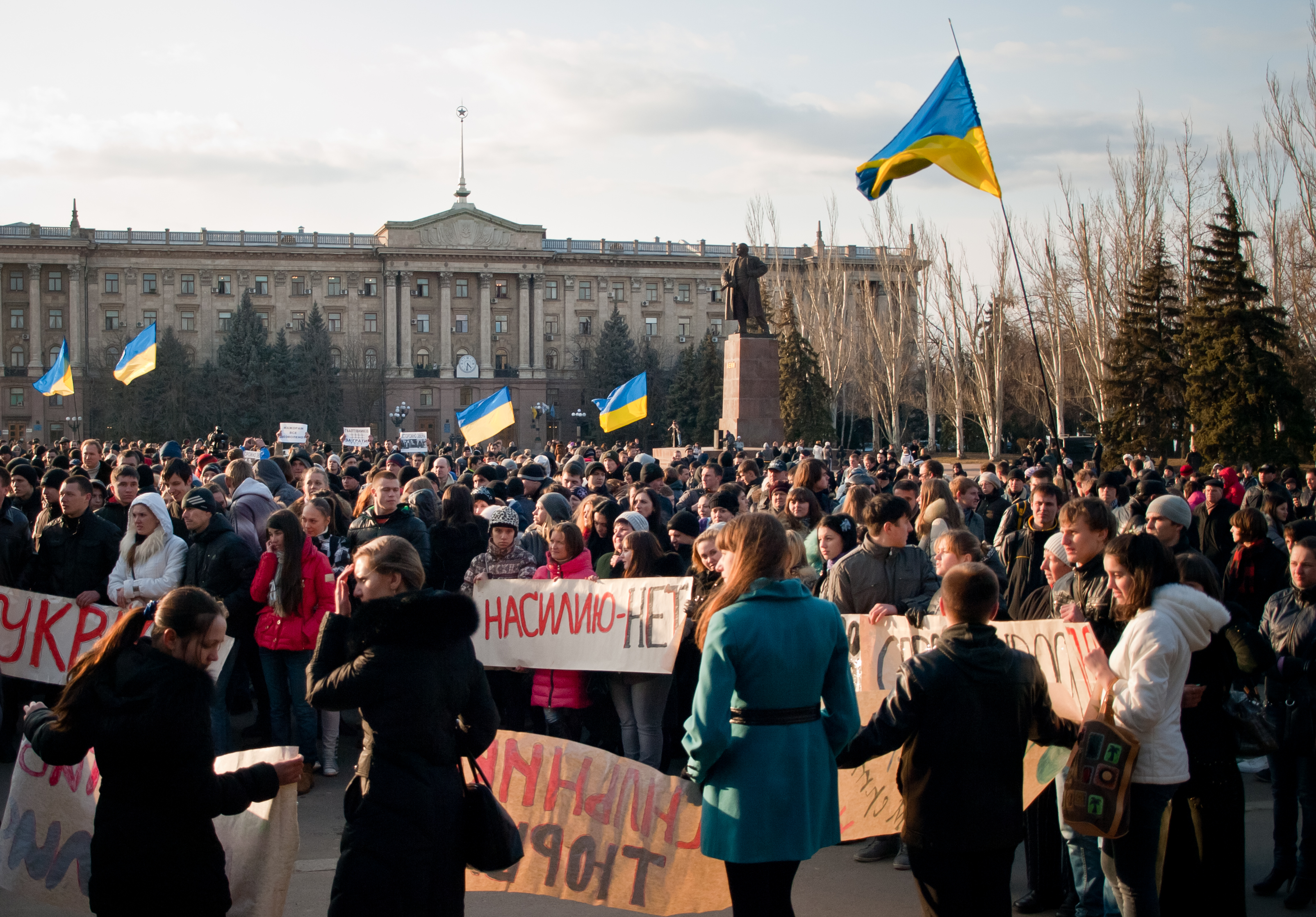
Protest in support of Makar on 15 March 2012 in Mykolaiv

The actions of the police were deeply criticised by the media and led to public protests in Mykolaiv, Kharkiv, Lviv and Odesa. The death of Makar was linked with so-called "bigwig crimes": crimes committed by either the children of public officials or by officials themselves. According to victim's mother, Taetiana Surovytska, her connections within one of the central TV channels in Ukraine helped to ensure widespread initial media coverage. Surovitskaya posted footage of Makar in hospital after medics had been forced to amputate one of her arms and both her feet on YouTube (these amputations can clearly be seen on the video) two weeks after the attack.

Ukrainian billionaire and member of parliament Renat Akhmetov had aided the transfer of Makar to the Donetsk Burn Center and also paid for the Swiss surgeon.

The Governor of the Mykolaiv province, Mykola Kruhlov blamed among the others the family of the injured girl: "The question of control of the child - it's family issues. This is a minor child, in our 18 years in school learning - I am at this point I say". Raisa Bohatyryova (Deputy Prime Minister and concurrently the Minister of Health) held talks with Mykola Kruhlov and asked him to provide all the necessary medical care for Makar.

The Ukrainian Presidential adviser, Maryna Stavniychuk, voiced her support to the residents of Mykolaiv and opposed the initial release of suspects. She announced that the Presidential Administration was surprised by the behavior of law enforcement officers, who released the suspects of the rape and attempted murder. The presidential adviser further expressed her personal disbelief over the release of the suspects.

Member of parliament Serhiy Sobolev said that "the spokesman of the Mykolaiv regional police department is frankly lying" when she (Lt. Col. Olha Perederenko) stated that "the girl was in such condition that it could not provide any evidence", Sobolev was shocked that Olha Perederenko still holds her position.

During the plenary session of the Verkhovna Rada (Ukraine's parliament) on March 14, Hennadiy Zadyrko, in reaction to the incident involving Oksana Makar, said that Ukraine should "bring back the death penalty". The deputy Olegh Liashko urged his colleagues to donate one day's salary to Makar's medical treatment. He also opined that they should "castrate pedophiles".

Secretary of the National Security and Defense Council of Ukraine Andriy Klyuyev expressed confidence that the perpetrators will be punished with the full extent of the law. He noted that "the government must adequately respond to any crime - no one has to avoid punishment, regardless of affiliation or social status".

An Honored Artist of Ukraine Anzhelika Rudnytska has stated she doesn't not believe in the execution of President Viktor Yanukovych order to ensure a full and impartial investigation of rape Oksana Makar. She said: "If the law enforcement system is not able to protect its citizens and punish those responsible, the people themselves must all available legal means to force her to do it".

After Makar had died on 29 March 2012 President Yanukovych and Prime Minister Mykola Azarov were among the first to offer condolences. Azarov wrote on his blog “No compromises. Only with the knowledge that punishment is inevitable will these monsters fear to encroach on people’s lives and rights.”

=== Rallies and funds collection ===
On the morning of March 13, dozens of Mykolaiv residents went to the first rally next to the Central police station. The rally moved to the Prosecutor's Office of the Mykolaiv province. Another protest was held at Lenin Square.

On March 15, another rally was held in the central area of Mykolaiv, near Lenin Square, in support of Oksana Makar with a few thousand participants. Due to the resonance of the Oksana Makar assault, another, similar criminal case was revealed, involving another teenager, Aleksandra Popova, who was hospitalized on the same day and was unconscious for weeks. The rally became supportive of both Oksana Makar and Aleksandra Popova. The demonstrators who gathered in Lenin Square were able to collect ₴7,511 for the treatment of Oksana Makar and ₴6,652 were collected for Alexandra Popova. The general public donated over ₴1 million for the treatment of Makar, according to her mother.

=== Blood donation ===
On March 14–15, more than 150 Mykolaiv residents donated blood for Oksana Makar. After she was moved to Donetsk, over 60 Donetsk residents donated blood, plus 150 Donetsk policemen.

== See also ==
- Rape of Iryna Krashkova
- Corruption in Ukraine#Judicial corruption
- Judicial system of Ukraine
- Mazhory
