= Julie Rovner =

American journalist and author

Julie Rovner is an American journalist and author. Currently the Chief Washington Correspondent for Kaiser Health News (KHN) and host of its podcast, "What the Health", Rovner previously reported for National Public Radio, National Journal's Congress Daily, Congressional Quarterly, and The Lancet.

== Bibliography ==
- Rovner, Julie. "Congress’s ‘catastrophic’ attempt to fix medicare." Intensive care: How Congress shapes health policy. Washington, DC: American Enterprise Institute and Brookings Institution, 1995.
- Rovner, Julie. Health care policy and politics A to Z. Washington, D.C: CQ Press, 2009. Print.
- Rovner, Julie. Prospects for health reform in 2009 and beyond : 20th anniversary lecture. Washington, D.C: National Academies Press, 2009. Print.

== See also ==
- Kaiser Family Foundation
