= Mazhory =

Soviet slang for privileged children

Mazhory (roughly meaning "the upper ones", from French majeurs) is a slang term used in the Soviet Union and post-Soviet countries for children of privileged people, who take advantage of their inborn privileges (nepotism, cronyism, avoiding due punishment, etc.), often in an arrogant and abusive way.

== Meaning ==
=== Ukraine ===
The term Mazhory (Ukrainian: мажо́ри) is used to describe children of high-ranking, mid-ranking, and sometimes even seemingly low-ranking officials in the government, police force, judiciary or army. (Note: According to Andriy Portnov, in 2012 a key adviser on judicial affairs to President Viktor Yanukovich, law-enforcement officers and justice officials retain the Soviet-era habit of wanting to please officials up the bureaucratic ladder. This "Soviet mentality" leads, according to Ukrainian social commentators, to a kind of inbuilt impunity for the privileged and wealthy, as well as for their children.) This term is also used to describe officials themselves as well as wealthy businessmen and their children. They are seen to lead easier lives than normal people, due to their parents' influence. Often they are able to avoid punishment, or receive less severe punishments than usual, when committing crimes. (Note: The following are some of the most famous cases in Ukraine where children of high-ranking officials were perceived to have avoided, or be about to avoid, punishment: Murder of Oksana Makar in March 2012.; In July 2011 security camera footage leaked to YouTube showed a young man dragging a woman by her hair around the floor of a restaurant in Luhansk. The assailant in the video turned out to be Roman Landik, a 37-year-old son of member of the Ukrainian Parliament Volodymyr Landik and a prominent figure in the region himself. It is believed that public attention to the case has helped to ensure that the justice was done which otherwise might not have been the case.; On 16 June 2009, Viktor Lozinsky, member of the Verkhovna Rada (Ukrainian parliament), murdered an ordinary peasant Valeriy Olijnik. At the time of the murder he was accompanied by the chief district prosecutor and the chief of local police who assisted the crime to various extents. Shortly after the murder another Ukrainian MP, Volodymyr Pylypenko, nominated Lozinsky for a bravery award. The case gained media attention as well as attention of the opposition. Lozinsky was arrested on 1 March 2010, was convicted of murder on 20 April 2011 and had his sentence reduced from 15 to 14 years on appeal in March 2012 and in March 2013 to 10 years in another appeal. Others in the "Lozinsky case" were sentenced to various terms in prison: former prosecutor of Holovanivsk Raion Yevhen Horbenko to nine years in prison, former head of the Holovanivsk district department of police Mykhailo Kovalsky to five years in prison with a three-year probation period, and Holovanivsk forestry huntsman Vasyl Perepelytsia to four years in prison.) This phenomenon is also known in other countries of the former Soviet Union.

=== Russia ===
In Russia the term Mazhory (Russian: мажо́ры) is connected with young socialites rather than with abuse of power; but the term is also connected with criminal misdemeanour of advantaged youth. The term "golden youth" (Russian: Золотая молодёжь) is more commonly used in Russia to describe this advantaged youth.

==== Soviet Union ====
In the Soviet Union the term Mazhory was connected with children of high-ranked officials who, through their parents, had greater access to Western products than the average young person and could travel abroad more easily. (Note: Russian rock band ДДТ recorded a song Мальчики мажоры (Mazhory boys) in 1985.)

== See also ==
- Fresa (slang)
- Princelings, a term for the children of senior communists in China
