= Gennady Rovner =

Russian and American musician, composer and scientist

- Born: September 19, 1961 (age 65)
- Citizenship: Russia, USA
- Occupations: musician, composer, scientist
- Website: rovnerforms.com/en/

Gennady Rovner is a Russian and American musician, composer and scientist.

== Biography ==
Gennady Rovner was born on September 19, 1961, in the village of Tomilino, Lyuberetsky District, Moscow oblast (USSR).

Rovner has played piano and composed music since childhood. In 1975, he graduated music school with a specialization in piano.

In 1983, he graduated from the Mechanical Department of the Gubkin Russian State University of Oil and Gas with a degree in Mechanical Engineering. His dissertation was titled "Research and development of an industrial complex for the production and sale of gas motor fuel".

Gennady Rovner became a U.S. citizen in 2001.

== Career ==
After graduation, Rovner worked at scientific institutions within the USSR oil and gas industry, earning the academic degree of Candidate of Technical Sciences. He also worked in the industrial sector and participated in the development and creation of Russia's first multi-fuel refueling complexes for motor vehicles, a network of gas-filling stations meeting international environmental standards, mobile gas stations, and high-pressure methane gas cylinder equipment rated at 32 MPa.

He went on to author a number of books, brochures, scientific articles, and monographs.

Since 2011, Rovner has been composing and performing symphonic music. His professional debut as a composer came with the release of the vinyl record Tanaya- a full-scale symphonic work that includes a concerto for piano and orchestra. Rovner's alma mater, Gubkin University, regularly hosts musical events for their students with his participation.

In 2015, Rovner participated in the organization of the music project India Inside – a collaborative album recorded by musicians from leading Russian symphony orchestras, as well as renowned British and Indian musicians. The sound producer was Haydn Bendall, with Sergei Smolin also serving as producer. Over 300 performers from around the world participated, including two symphony orchestras, a Jewish choir, jazz musicians and other artists. Recording took place in six studios – Mosfilm (Moscow), Real World Studios, AIR Studios, Strongroom Music Studios and Metropolis Studios (London); and Yash Raj Films (Mumbai). A documentary of the same name, directed by Alexander Smirnov, with cinematography by Valery Osmakov, was later released based on the project and Rovner's symphonic work.

In the spring of 2020, a limited edition vinyl record called Tesseract was released in Germany. The album features music by Gennady Rovner, interpreted and performed by jazz pianist Leonid Chizhik.

Rovner's composition Metamorphosis is a symphonic cycle consisting of nine symphonic novellas. In 2021, the eponymous music album was recorded at LenDoc Studio in St. Petersburg by the Northern Symphony Orchestra under Maestro Fabio Mastrangelo. In 2023, Metamorphosis was performed by the Tchaikovsky Symphony Orchestra, conducted by Maestro Vladimir Fedoseyev, with vocals by Alina Yarovaya. In 2024, Metamorphosis premiered on the Kultura TV channel.

Concerts and performances featuring Gennady Rovner are regularly held. On November 16, 2024, in Kazan, in the Saidashev State Big Concert Hall, the composer's benefit performance took place featuring the State Chamber Choir of Tatarstan, soloist of the Moscow Philharmonic Society Filipp Kopachevsky and Honored Artist of the Republic of Tatarstan Elza Islamova. The concert was conducted by Maestro Alexander Sladkovskiy.

On February 24, 2025, a concert "Music of Survival: Works by Weinberg, Korngold, and Rovner" was held at Carnegie Hall in New York. Conducted by Maestro Konstantin Orbelyan, the New York City Opera performed a program dedicated to the Holocaust, featuring cellist Kristina Reiko Cooper, soprano Elizaveta Ulakhovich and music by Gennady Rovner.

In July 2026, Gennady Rovner was elected a voting member of the National Academy of Recording Arts & Sciences (The Recording Academy), known for awarding Grammy Awards.
