= Igor Vereshchagin =

Russian music and street photographer

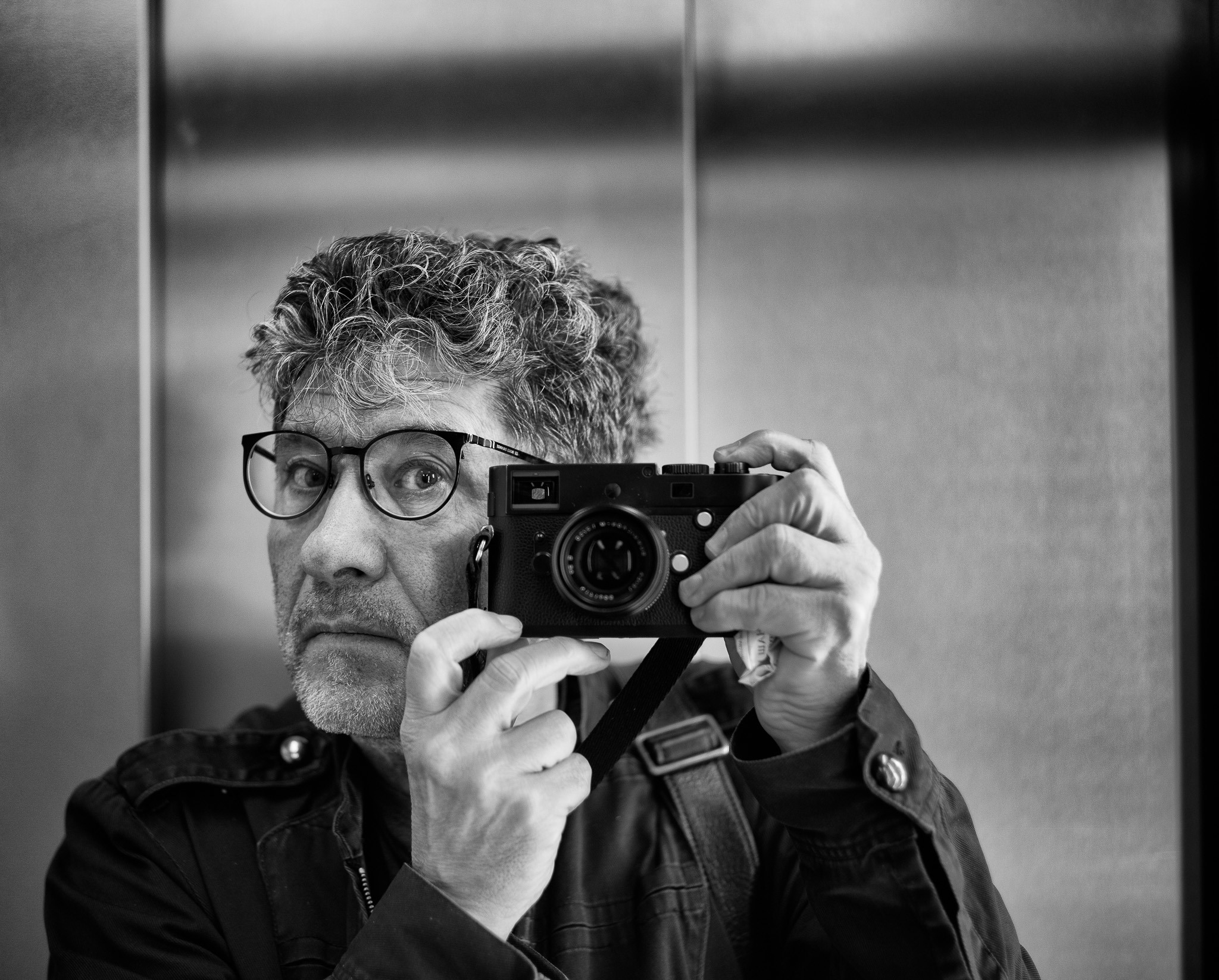
Igor Vereshchagin

Igor Evgenievich Vereshchagin (29 May 1952, in Kamensk-Uralskiy) is a Russian music and street photographer.

== Biography ==
Igor Vereshchagin was born on the 29 May 1952 in the town of Kamensk-Uralskiy of Sverdlovsk region. He graduated from the faculty of radiotechnics of Tomsk Institute of Radioelectronics and Electronic Technology (nowadays Tomsk State University of Control Systems and Radio-electronics).

After finishing his studies at the institute, Igor Vereshchagin worked for several years at the electronic computing machines center of the Bratsk Aluminum Plant and later became the chief of its photo service. At the same time, he started photographing for some newspapers and magazines, but his dream to photograph musicians and street scenes came true only after he had left for Moscow.

=== Career ===
Igor Vereshchagin took his first photographs in 1957 when he was 5. At the age of 42 he moved to Moscow where he met Artur Pilavin, a leader of the group “The Kvartal”. The musicians of the group were the first that Vereshchagin began to take pictures of in the capital.

The photographer soon got acquainted with Garik Sukachov, and took some photos of him by his own personal request at the MHAT (Moscow Art Theatre) concert on the 25th of October in 1996. Soon after the concert he started working as an exclusive photographer for all of Sukachev's films: “The Crises of Middle Age” (1997), “The Holiday” (2001), “The House of the Sun” (2010). This period becomes the start of Vereshchagin's work with artists and musicians.

The works of Vereshchagin were published in many Russian and western magazines. For several years he worked as a member of a part-time staff in such magazines as: “Ogoniok”, “Sobesednick”, “Stas”, “Medved”, “Ptyuch”, “Expert”, “Photo/Video”, “Theater”, “Sputnick telezritelya”, “Zhivoy Zvook”, “Elements”, “ Week” (newspaper), ”Moskovskij Komsomolets” (newspaper).

Vereshchagin's photographs were also used for the designs of posters and covers of musical albums.

The personal exhibition of Igor Vereshchagin, Given and Stolen, was held at MAAM (Multimedia Art Museum) from March to April. It was held within the framework of the Moscow Bienalle "Fashion and Style in Photography." In 2017, he published the book Given and Stolen.

== Family ==
His wife is Vera Vasilievna Vereshchagina, an entrepreneur, and their daughter is Irina, born in 1974. They have grandchildren, Alina, born 1997, and Maxim, born 2003.
