= Vradiivka Raion =

Former subdivision of Mykolaiv Oblast, Ukraine

Vradiivka Raion Врадіївський район
- Raion
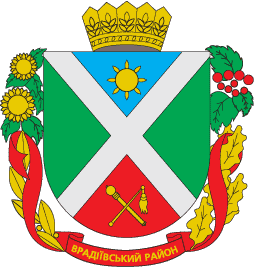
- Flag Coat of arms

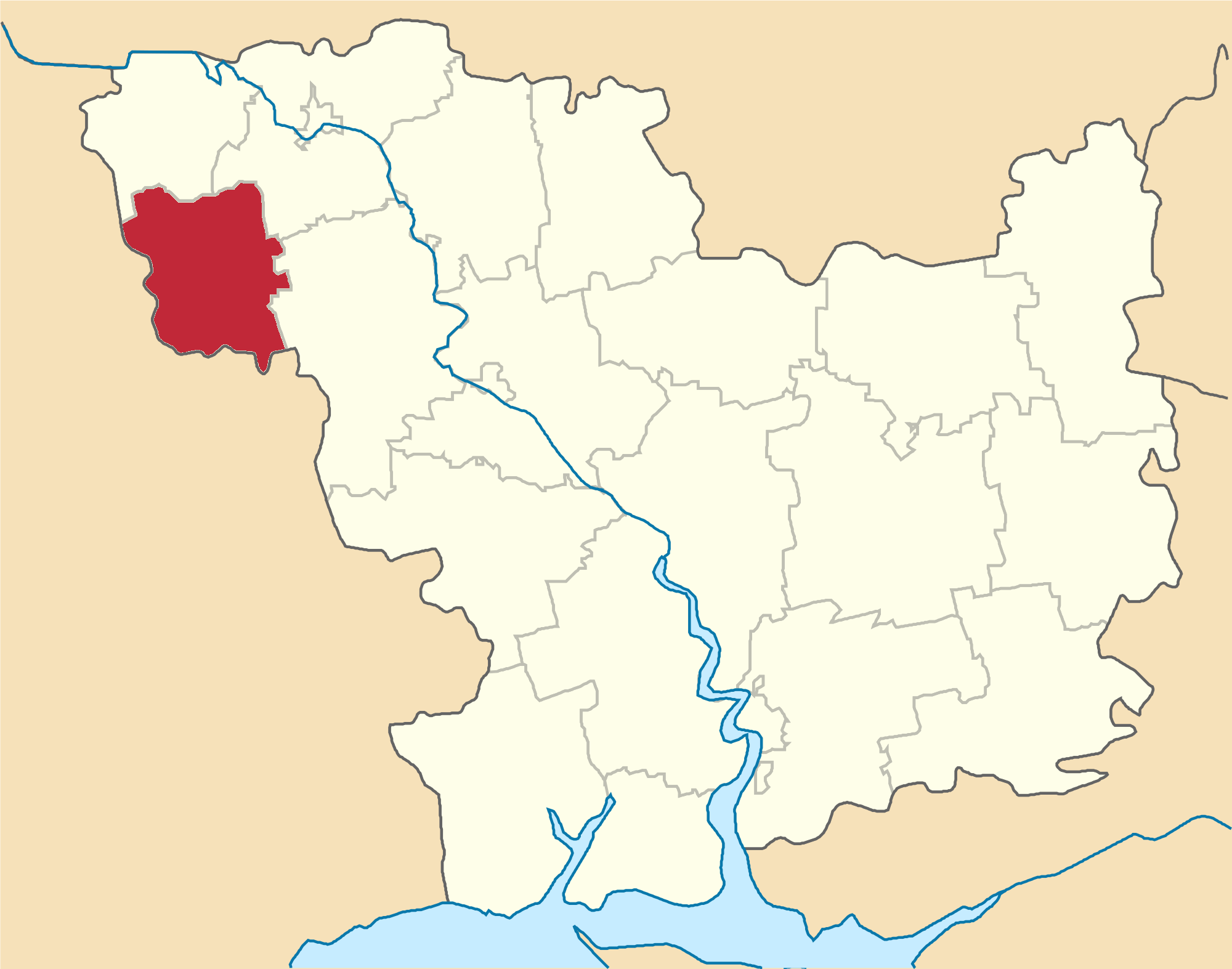
- Coordinates: 47°45′47″N 30°35′5″E
- Country: Ukraine
- Oblast: Mykolaiv Oblast
- Established: 8 December 1966
- Disestablished: 18 July 2020
- Admin. center: Vradiivka
- Subdivisions: List: 0 — city councils; 1 — settlement councils; 11 — rural councils; Number of localities: 0 — cities; 1 — urban-type settlements; 36 — villages; 0 — rural settlements

Government
  - Governor: Vitalyi Rostov

Area
  - Total: 811 km^{2} (313 sq mi)

Population (2020)
  - Total: 16,836 ▼
  - Density: 20.8/km^{2} (53.8/sq mi)
- Time zone: UTC+02:00 (EET)
  - Summer (DST): UTC+03:00 (EEST)
- Postal index: 56300—56341
- Area code: +380 5135

Vradiivka Raion (Ukrainian: Врадіївський район) was a subdivision of Mykolaiv Oblast of Ukraine. Its administrative center was the urban-type settlement of Vradiivka. The raion was abolished on 18 July 2020 as part of the administrative reform of Ukraine, which reduced the number of raions of Mykolaiv Oblast to four. The area of Vradiivka Raion was merged into Pervomaisk Raion. The last estimate of the raion population was 16,836 (2020 est.)

== History ==
In the 1920s, the current area of the district belonged to Ananyev Uyezd of Odessa Governorate. In 1923, uyezds in Ukrainian Soviet Socialist Republic were abolished, and the governorates were divided into okruhas. In 1923, Velyka Vradiivka Raion with the administrative center in Vradiivka was established. It belonged to Pervomaisk Okruha. In 1925, the governorates were abolished, and okruhas were directly subordinated to Ukrainian SSR. In 1930, okruhas were abolished, and on 27 February 1932, Odessa Oblast was established, and Velyka Vradiivka was included into Odessa Oblast. In February 1954, Velyka Vradiivka Raion was transferred to Mykolaiv Oblast. In January 1963, during the abortive Khrushchyov administrative reform, Velyka Vradiivka Raion was abolished and merged into Kryve Ozero Raion. In 1964, Velyka Vradiivka was renamed Vradiivka. On 8 December 1966 Vradiivka Raion with the administrative center in Vradiivka was established on the lands previously belonging to Kryve Ozero Raion. In 1967, Vradiivka was granted urban-type settlement status.

At the time of disestablishment, the raion consisted of one hromada, Vradiivka settlement hromada with the administration in Vradiivka.
