= Multimedia Art Museum, Moscow =

Art museum in Moscow, Russia

- Мультимедиа Арт Музей
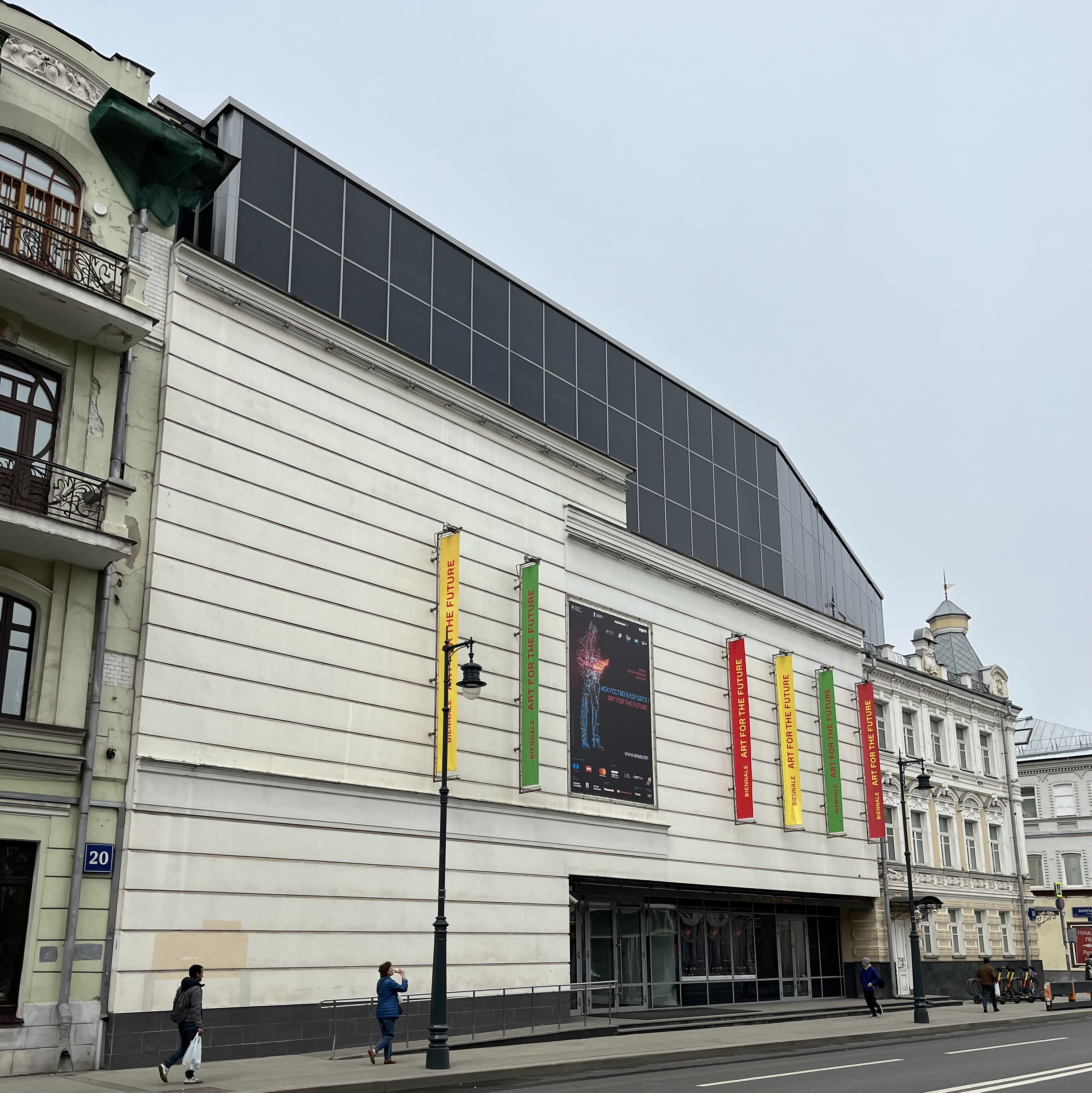

- Location within Moscow
- Established: October 2010
- Location: Moscow, Russia
- Coordinates: 55.7416°N 37.5987°E
- Collection size: more than 1300 exhibitions
- Website: mamm-mdf.ru/en/

The Multimedia Art Museum, Moscow (MAMM; Russian: Мультимедиа Арт Музей, Москва) is a Russian state museum dedicated to the presentation and development of contemporary art related to new multimedia technologies. The museum was opened in October 2010 on the grounds of the Moscow House of Photography. Initially it was founded in 1996.

== Details ==
The Multimedia Art Museum Moscow was founded in 1996 as the Moscow House of Photography (MDF). It was the first Russian state art institution focused on the art of photography. In 2001, it was transformed into the Multimedia Complex of Contemporary Arts. The Complex includes the Moscow House of Photography; The Alexander Rodchenko School of Photography and Multimedia, opened in 2006 and named after Russian classic of photography Alexander Rodchenko; and the Multimedia Art Museum, Moscow (MAMM), intended to acquaint Russian audiences with contemporary art and multimedia technologies.

In 2005, the museum building on Ostozhenka street, 16 went under construction, but the museum continued its exhibition and educational activities. In 2010, the Complex returned to its renovated building numbering approximately 9,000 square metres (97,000 sq ft) of space. The new space has four floors for exhibitions and archives for its 90,000-photograph collection.

Cumulative exhibition history of MAMM and Moscow House of Photography numbers more than 1300 exhibitions in Russia and abroad, and more than 100 books issued.

In the summer of 2016, the Multimedia Art Museum launched the site "History of Russia in photographs" - a non-profit project, uniting museum and private photos and photocolties created in Russia from 1860 to 1999. An online archive accommodates more than 100 thousand professional and amateur images and 100 virtual exhibitions. Anyone can send a photo from its collection or family archive to the site, or create an exhibition from the pictures available on the site. The project allows to learn a specific era, learn how to change in time life, fashion, architecture etc.

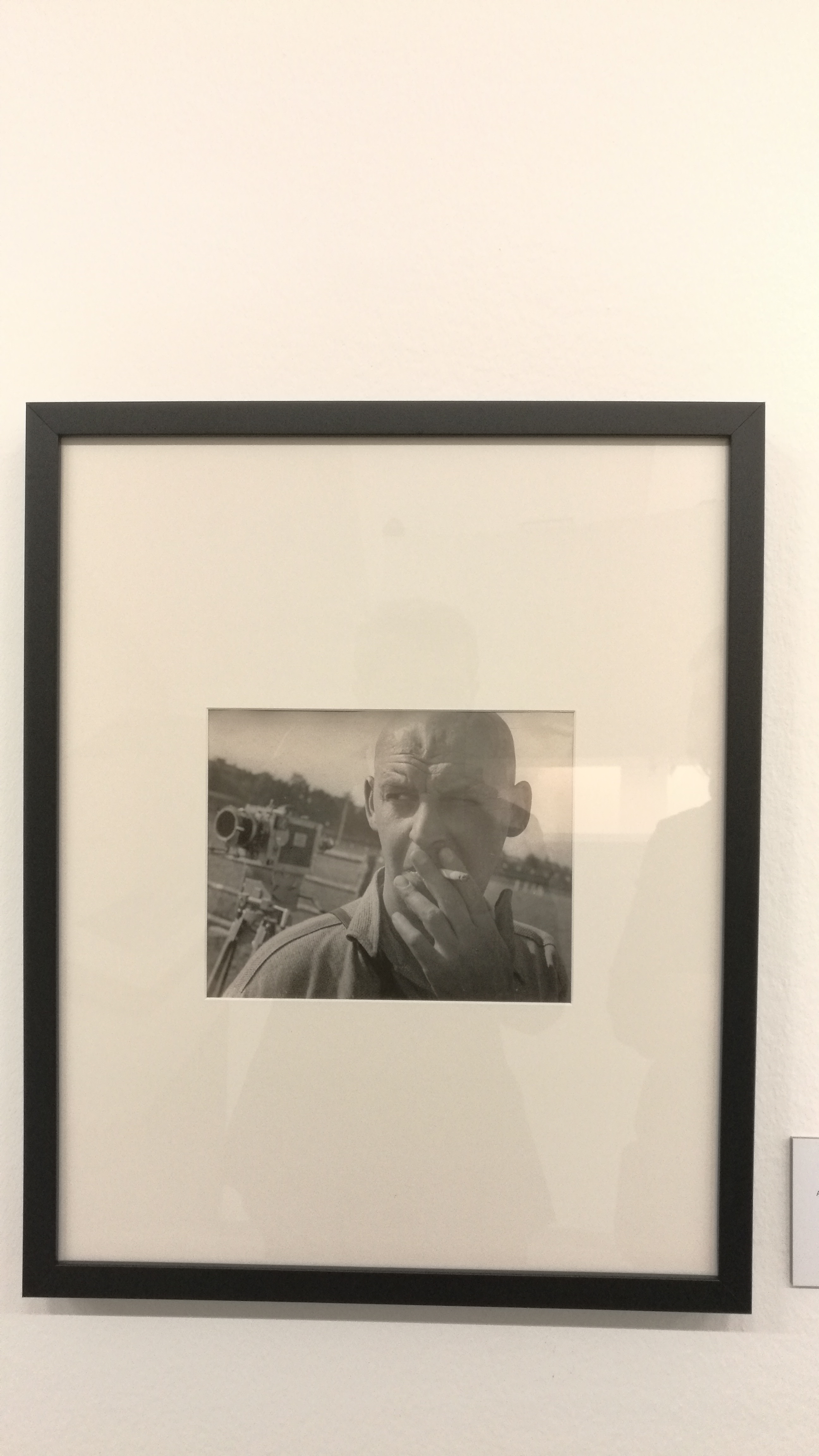
Photograph of Alexander Rodchenko

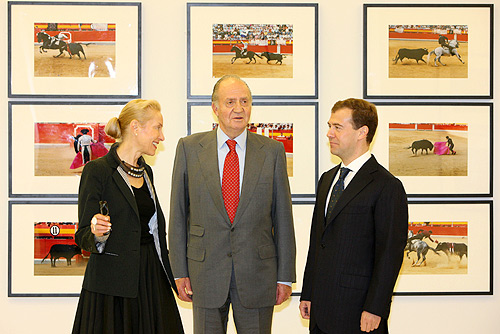
The MAMM's Olga Sviblova with Juan Carlos I of Spain and Dmitry Medvedev in 2008

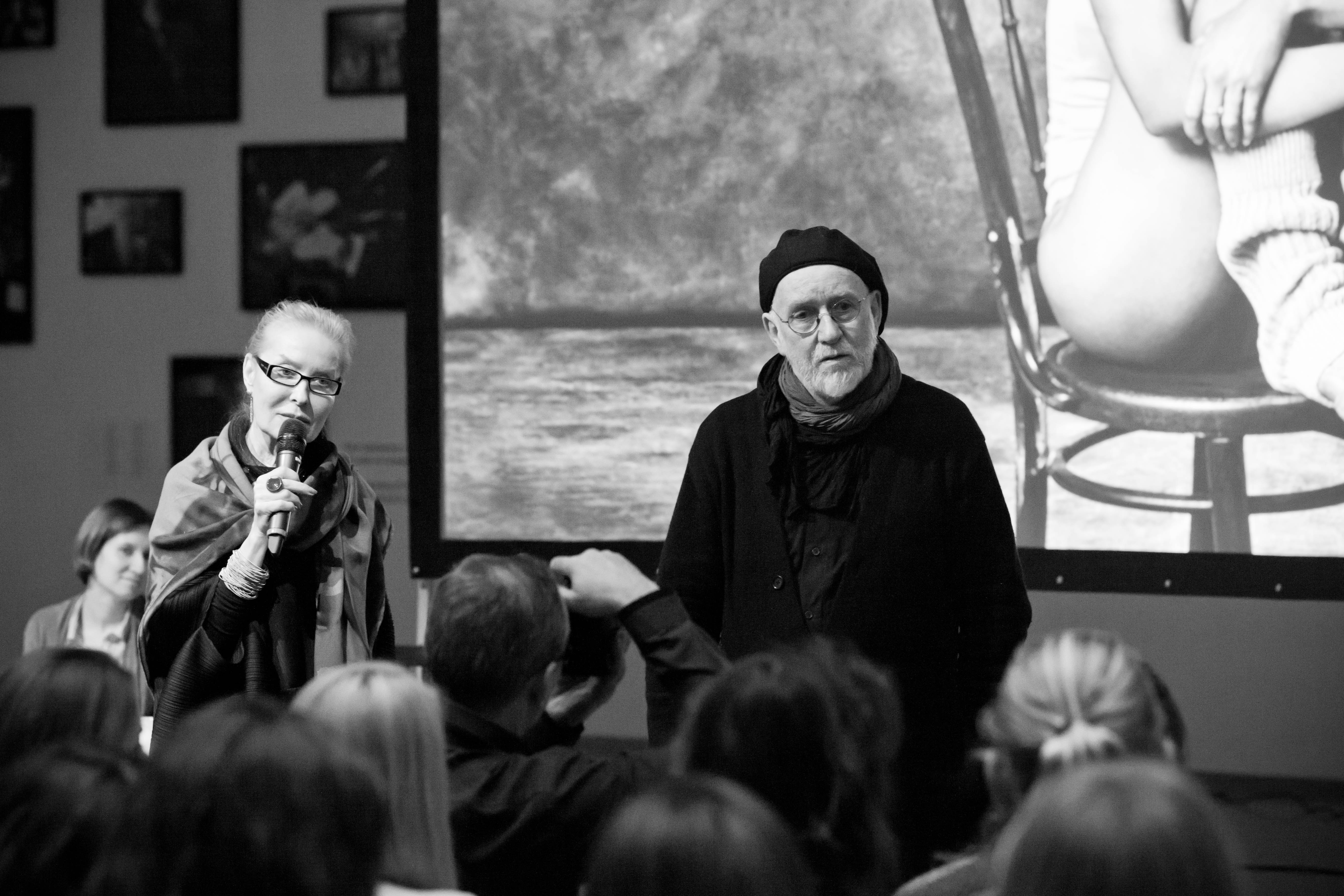
The MAMM's Olga Sviblova with Albert Watson
