= Olga Sviblova =

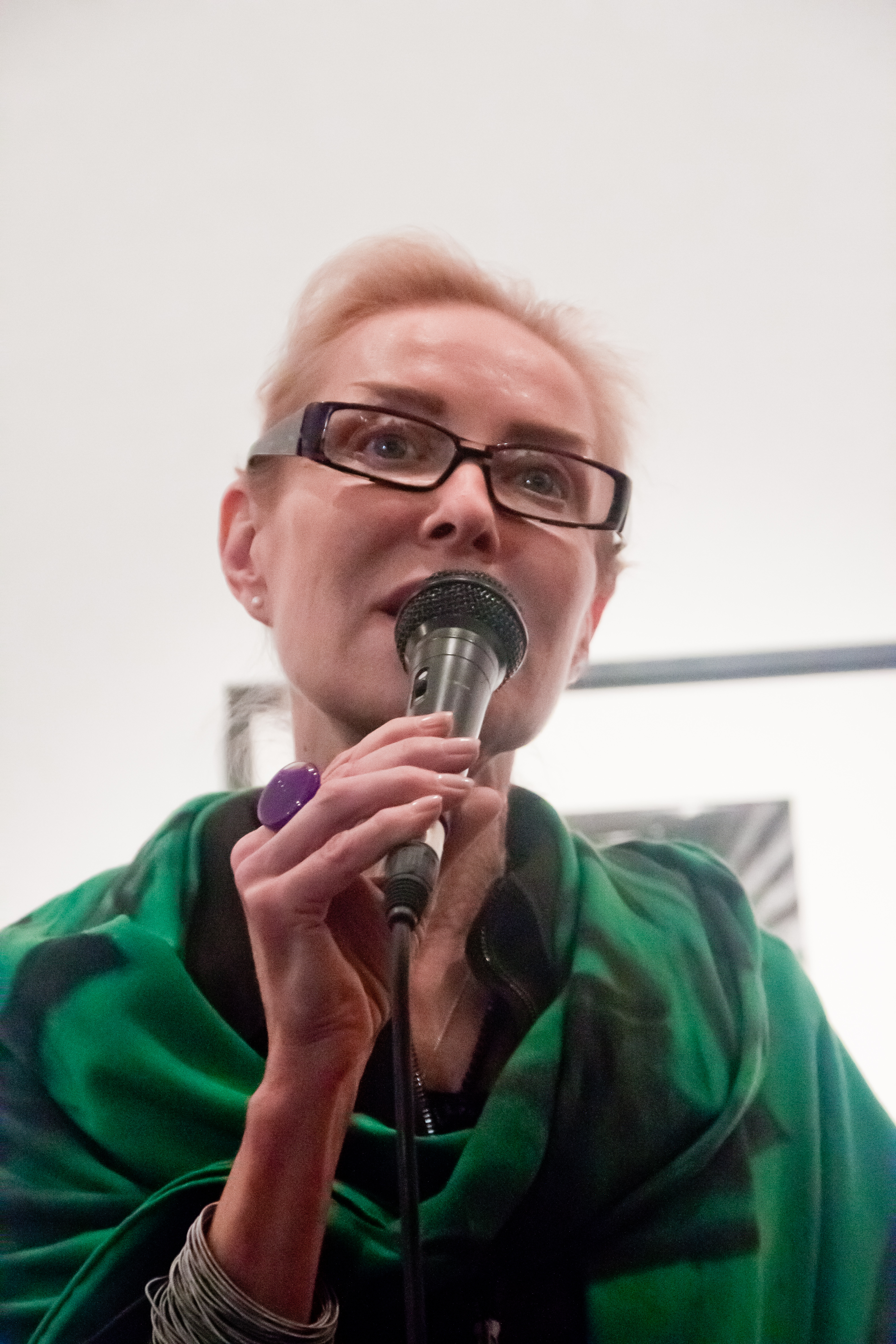
- Born: 6 June 1953 (age 72); Moscow, USSR
- Occupations: Curator, film director, arts administrator
- Years active: Since 1987

Olga Lvovna Sviblova (Russian: Ольга Львовна Свиблова, born on June 6, 1953, in Moscow, USSR) is a Russian curator, film director, and arts administrator. In 1996, she founded the Moscow House of Photography, which later became the Multimedia Art Museum, Moscow; she has been a director there since the institution's establishment.

== Life and career ==
A graduate of Moscow State University with majors in psychology, she has later pursued a Ph. D. researching psychology in arts. In 1970s, she took a job as a street sweeper, to have, in her own words, "a job for intelligent people". In the 1980s, she created a number of documentaries, earning her prominence both in the USSR, and internationally. The first exhibition she organized was in 1987, when she arranged for a showcase of emerging Soviet artists. Over a career spanning three decades, she has curated more than five hundred exhibitions of contemporary visual art and photography in Russia, and internationally.

In 2007 and in 2009, she was the curator of the national pavilion of Russia at the Venice Biennale.

== Selected awards ==
- Order of Friendship (2007), Russia
- Chevalier, and Officer of Legion d'Honeur (2008, 2017), France
- Order of Merit (2011), Italy
