= List of Vogue France cover models =

This list of Vogue France cover models (1937–present) is a catalog of cover models who have appeared on the cover of Vogue France, the French edition of American fashion magazine Vogue. From 1920 to 2021 the magazine was named Vogue Paris.

== 1930s ==
=== 1937 ===
Issue	Cover model	Illustrator/Photographer
January		Edward Steichen
February		
March		
April		
May		
June		
July		Horst P. Horst
August	—N/a	Miguel Covarrubias
September		
October		
November	—N/a	Christian Bérard
December	Ludmila Feodoseyevna	Horst P. Horst

=== 1938 ===
Issue	Cover model	Illustrator/Photographer
January	—N/a	Pierre Roy
February		André Durst
March		
April	—N/a	Carl Erickson
May	—N/a	René Bouët-Willaumez
August	—N/a	Georges Lepape
September	—N/a	Carl Erickson
October	—N/a	Eduardo Benito
November	—N/a	Jean Pagès
December	—N/a	Eduardo Benito

=== 1939 ===
Issue	Cover model	Illustrator
January	—N/a	
February	—N/a	Carl Erickson
March	—N/a	Eduardo Benito
April	—N/a	Réné Robert Bouché
May		Horst P. Horst
June	—N/a	Eduardo Benito
July	—N/a	Carl Erickson
August	—N/a	Christian Bérard
September	—N/a	Carl Erickson
December	—N/a	Christian Bérard

== 1940s ==
=== 1940 ===
Issue	Cover model	Illustrator
March	—N/a	Jean Pagès
April/May	—N/a	Eduardo Benito

=== 1945 ===
Issue	Cover model	Illustrator
Liberation Special	—N/a	Christian Bérard
Winter	—N/a	Zinaida Serebriakova

=== 1946 ===
Issue	Cover model	Illustrator
Summer	—N/a	Carl Erickson
Winter	—N/a	Lila de Nobili

=== 1947 ===
Issue	Cover model	Illustrator
January/February	—N/a	
March/April	—N/a	Lila de Nobili
May/June	—N/a	Giulio Coltellacci
July/August	—N/a	Giulio Coltellacci
September	—N/a	Giulio Coltellacci
October/November	—N/a	Giulio Coltellacci
December	—N/a	Tom Keogh

=== 1948 ===
Issue	Cover model	Illustrator
February	—N/a	Philippe Jullian
March	—N/a	Lila de Nobili
April	—N/a	Lila de Nobili
May	—N/a	Giulio Coltellacci
July	—N/a	Janine Fréjaville
September	—N/a	André Francois
October/November	—N/a	Carl Erickson
December/January 1949	—N/a	André Francois

=== 1949 ===
Issue	Cover model	Illustrator/Photographer
February	—N/a	Carl Erickson
March	—N/a	Tom Keogh
May	—N/a	Giulio Coltellacci
June	—N/a	André Francois
July/August	—N/a	Tom Keogh
September	—N/a	Giulio Coltellacci
October	—N/a	
November		Richard Rutledge
December/January 1950	—N/a	Richard Rutledge

== 1950s ==
=== 1950 ===
Issue	Cover model	Photographer/Illustrator
February	—N/a	André François
March	—N/a	Tom Keogh
April	—N/a	Tom Keogh
May	—N/a	Carl Erickson
June		Robert Randall
July/August	—N/a	Carl Erickson
September	Sophie Malgat	Robert Randall
October	Régine Debrise	Irving Penn
November	Lisa Fonssagrives	Irving Penn
December/January 1951		Arik Népo

=== 1951 ===
Issue	Cover model	Photographer
February		Robert Randall
March		Arik Népo
April	Eve Gerney; Anne Gunning; Bettina Graziani; Sophie Malgat	John Rawlings
May	Jeanne Klein	Robert Doisneau
June		Robert Doisneau
July/August	Régine Debrise	Henry Clarke
September	Nina de Voogt	Henry Clarke
October	Della Oake	Cecil Beaton
November	Jackie Stoloff	Arik Népo
December/January 1952		Robert Doisneau

=== 1952 ===
Issue	Cover model	Photographer
February		Robert Doisneau
March		Henry Clarke
April	Ivy Nicholson	Henry Clarke
May	Fiona Campbell-Walter	Horst P. Horst
June	Sue Jenks	Henry Clarke
July/August	Lisa Fonssagrives	Irving Penn
September	Margaret Phillips	Henry Clarke
October	Fiona Campbell-Walter	Robert Doisneau
November	Niki de Saint Phalle	Robert Doisneau
December/January 1953	Margaret Phillips	Henry Clarke

=== 1953 ===
Issue	Cover model	Photographer
February	Gene Tierney	Henry Clarke
March	Susan Abraham	Henry Clarke
April	Anne Gunning	Henry Clarke
May	Suzy Parker	Henry Clarke
June	Anne Gunning	Henry Clarke
July/August	Bettina Graziani	Robert Randall
September		René Bouché
October	Suzy Parker	Henry Clarke
November	Ivy Nicholson	Henry Clarke
December/January 1954	Fiona Campbell-Walter	Sabine Weiss

=== 1954 ===
Issue	Cover model	Photographer
February	Suzy Parker	Henry Clarke
March	Patricia Prunonosa; Anna	Sabine Weiss
April	Suzy Parker	Henry Clarke
May	Ivy Nicholson	Henry Clarke
June	Suzy Parker	Henry Clarke
July/August	Capucine	Henry Clarke
September	Candy Tanney	Clifford Coffin
October	Ivy Nicholson	Erwin Blumenfeld
November	Nancy Berg; Elsa Martinelli; Candy Tanney	Clifford Coffin
December/January 1955	Nancy Berg	Erwin Blumenfeld

=== 1955 ===
Issue	Cover model	Photographer
February	Fiona Campbell-Walter	Henry Clarke
March		René Gruau
April	Anne St. Marie	Henry Clarke
May	Anne St. Marie	Henry Clarke
June/July	Fiona Campbell-Walter	Sabine Weiss
August	Nina de Voogt	Norman Parkinson
September		René Gruau
October	Anne St. Marie	Henry Clarke
November	Anouk Aimée	Henry Clarke
December/January 1956		Erwin Blumenfeld

=== 1956 ===
Issue	Cover model	Photographer
February	Ivy Nicholson	Henry Clarke
March		René Gruau
April	Dovima	Henry Clarke
May	Barbara Mullen	Henry Clarke
June/July	Mary Hilem	Henry Clarke
August	Mary Hilem	William Klein
September		René Gruau
October	Anne Gunning	Henry Clarke
November	Mary Hilem	Henry Clarke
December/January 1957	Patsy Pulitzer	Frances McLaughlin-Gill

=== 1957 ===
Issue	Cover model	Photographer
February	Simone D'Aillencourt	William Klein
March		René Gruau; Guy Bourdin
April		Richard Rutledge
May		Guy Arsac
June/July		Sabine Weiss
August	Barbara Mullen	Donald Silverstein
September	Marie-Hélène Arnaud	William Klein
October	Mary McLaughlin	William Klein
November	Marie-Hélène Arnaud	Henry Clarke
December/January 1958	Anouk Aimée; Gerard Philippe	William Klein

=== 1958 ===
Issue	Cover model	Photographer
February		William Klein
March		William Klein
April	Sondra Peterson	Henry Clarke
May	Marie-Hélène Arnaud	Henry Clarke
June/July	Rose Marie Le Quellec	Donald Silverstein
August	Marie-Hélène Arnaud	Guy Bourdin
September		Donald Silverstein
October	Marie-Hélène Arnaud	Sante Forlano
November		Guy Bourdin
December/January 1959	Anne St. Marie	Henry Clarke

=== 1959 ===
Issue	Cover model	Photographer
February	Marie-Hélène Arnaud; Alain Feydeau	Henry Clarke
March	Joanna McCormick; Betsy Pickering; Nena von Schlebrügge	Henry Clarke
April	Suzy Parker	Henry Clarke
May	Suzy Parker	Henry Clarke
June/July	Carmen Dell'Orefice	Norman Parkinson
August		Guy Bourdin
September	Marie-Hélène Arnaud	Leombruno-Bodi
October	Monique Chevalier	Irving Penn
November	Isabella Albonico	Irving Penn
December/January 1960	Monique Chevalier	Irving Penn

== 1960s ==
=== 1960 ===
Issue	Cover model	Photographer
February	Monique Chevalier	William Klein
March	Margaret "Maggie" Brown	
April	Simone D'Aillencourt	Henry Clarke
May	Anna Carin Bjorck	Jerry Schatzberg
June/July	Sunny Harnett	Willy Rizzo
August	Carla Marlier	Guy Bourdin
September	Mary McLaughlin	Irving Penn
October	Dorothy McGowan	Irving Penn
November	Anna Carin Bjorck	William Klein
December/January 1961	Pia Kazan	Lionel Kazan

=== 1961 ===
Issue	Cover model	Photographer
February	Sondra Peterson	William Klein
March	Monique Chevalier	Henry Clarke
April	Simone D'Aillencourt	William Klein
May	Nicole de Lamargé	Henry Clarke
June/July	Katherine Pastrie	Willy Rizzo
August	Sondra Peterson	
September	Dorothy McGowan	Irving Penn
October	Dorothy McGowan	Irving Penn
November	Nélida Lobato	Eber Lobato
December/January 1962	Anne de Zogheb	Irving Penn

=== 1962 ===
Issue	Cover model	Photographer
February		William Klein
March	Dolores Guinness	William Klein
April	Catherine Deneuve	Helmut Newton
May	Margo McKendry	William Klein
June/July	Dolores Hawkins	Helmut Newton
August	Tamara Nyman	Henry Clarke
September	Wilhelmina Cooper	Irving Penn
October	Monique Chevalier	Irving Penn
November	Loes Hamel	Helmut Newton
December	Sondra Peterson	Irving Penn

=== 1963 ===
Issue	Cover model	Photographer
January		Karen Radkai
February	Tamara Nyman	Karen Radkai
March	Tamara Nyman	Helmut Newton
April	Jean Shrimpton	Henry Clarke
May	Audrey Hepburn; Mel Ferrer	Bert Stern
June/July		William Klein
August	Françoise Hardy	Helmut Newton
September	Wilhelmina Cooper	David Bailey
October	Jean Shrimpton	David Bailey
November	Jean Shrimpton	David Bailey
December		Karen Radkai

=== 1964 ===
Issue	Cover model	Photographer
January	Sondra Peterson	Karen Radkai
February	Geraldine Chaplin	Jean-Jacques Bugat
March		Helmut Newton
April	Christa Fiedler; Tania Mallet	Helmut Newton
May	Dolores Guinness	Helmut Newton
June	Dolores Wettach	Helmut Newton
July	Celia Hammond	David Bailey
August	Elsa Martinelli	Karen Radkai
September	Kecia Nyman	Helmut Newton
October	Angela Howard	David Bailey
November	Astrid Heeren	Helmut Newton
December	Joanna Shimkus	Peter Knapp

=== 1965 ===
Issue	Cover model	Photographer
January	Joanna Shimkus	Sante Forlano
February	Anita Pallenberg	Brian Duffy
March	Maggi Eckardt	Helmut Newton
April	Elizabeth Taylor	William Klein
May	Deborah Dixon	Guy Bourdin
June	Marie-Hélène Sauer	William Klein
July	Sondra Peterson	Guy Bourdin
August	Jean Shrimpton	Guy Bourdin
September	Moyra Swan	David Bailey
October	Catherine Deneuve	David Bailey
November	Christa Fiedler	Philip Trager
December	Dorothy McGowan; Michele Belverge	Guy Bourdin

=== 1966 ===
Issue	Cover model	Photographer
January	Rita Scherrer	Monika Breitenmoser
February	Nicole de Lamargé	Guy Bourdin
March	Debbie Grieve	Guy Bourdin
April	Marisa Berenson	Richard Avedon
May	Nicole de Lamargé	David Bailey
June	Barbara Bech	Marc Hispard
July	Dorothy McGowan	Peter Knapp
August	Nicole de Lamargé	Peter Knapp
September	Kecia Nyman	Guy Bourdin
October	Donna Mitchell	David Bailey
November	Raquel Welch	David Bailey
December	Catherine Deneuve	David Bailey

=== 1967 ===
Issue	Cover model	Photographer
January	Jean Shrimpton	David Bailey
February	Christa Fiedler	David Bailey
March	Jean Shrimpton	David Bailey
April	Marisa Berenson	David Bailey
May	Twiggy	Henry Clarke
June	Candice Bergen	David Bailey
July	Marisa Berenson	David Bailey
August	Nathalie Delon	Jeanloup Sieff
September	Nicole de Lamargé	Guy Bourdin
October	Birgitta af Klercker	David Bailey
November	Candice Bergen	David Bailey
December	Marisa Berenson	Henry Clarke

=== 1968 ===
Issue	Cover model	Photographer
January	Jean Shrimpton	David Bailey
February	Catherine Deneuve	David Bailey
March	Marie Laforêt	Bob Richardson
April	Joanna Shimkus	Henry Clarke
May	Beatrice Dautresme	Henry Clarke
June		
July/August	Veruschka	Franco Rubartelli
September	Cynthia Korman	Jeanloup Sieff
October	Lauren Hutton	Irving Penn
November	Joanna Shimkus	Jeanloup Sieff
December/January 1969	Jean Shrimpton	David Bailey

=== 1969 ===
Issue	Cover model	Photographer
February	Catherine Deneuve	David Bailey
March	Julie Christie	Jeanloup Sieff
April	Dominique Sanda	Gerard Martinet
May	Jane Birkin	Jeanloup Sieff
June/July	Anne de Zogheb	Jeanloup Sieff
August	Catherine Deneuve	Jeanloup Sieff
September	Susan Blakely	Jeanloup Sieff
October	Geraldine Chaplin	Jeanloup Sieff
November	Susanne Schöneborn	Gerard Martinet
December/January 1970	Louise Despointes, Suzanne	Guy Bourdin

== 1970s ==
=== 1970 ===
Issue	Cover model	Photographer
February	Jane Fonda	Jeanloup Sieff
March	Jane Birkin	Jeanloup Sieff
April	Talitha Getty	Gerard Marthinet
May	Barbara Barnard	Jeanloup Sieff
June/July	Florence Lafuma	Alex Chatelain
August	Charlotte Rampling	Jeanloup Sieff
September	Catherine Deneuve	Jeanloup Sieff
October	Princess Alexandra Schoenburg	Jeanloup Sieff
November	Donna Jordan	Guy Bourdin
December/January 1971	Jeanne Moreau	Helmut Newton

=== 1971 ===
Issue	Cover model	Photographer/Artist
February	Liv Ullmann	Helmut Newton
March	Audrey Hepburn	Henry Clarke
April	Candice Bergen	Henry Clarke
May	Ali MacGraw	Alex Chatelain
June/July	Kiki Caron	Frank Horvat
August	Christine Walton	Alex Chatelain
September	Sylvie Vartan	Helmut Newton
October	Brigitte Bardot	Sveeva Vigeveno
November	Claudine Auger	Henry Clarke
December/January 1972	Marilyn Monroe, Mao Zedong	Salvador Dalí, Philippe Halsman
December/January 1972	Salvador Dalí	Salvador Dalí

=== 1972 ===
Issue	Cover model	Photographer
February	Catherine Deneuve	Helmut Newton
March	Marie Laforêt	Helmut Newton
April	Jean Seberg	Helmut Newton
May	Charlotte Rampling	Michael Reinhardt
June/July	Ursula Andress	René Chateau
August	Claudia Cardinale	René Chateau
September	Dominique Sanda	Michael Reinhardt
October	Monica Vitti	Henry Clarke
November	Catherine Deneuve	Tony Kent
December/January 1973	Giulietta Masina	Franco Pinna

=== 1973 ===
Issue	Cover model	Photographer
February	Brigitte Bardot	Terry O'Neill
March	Louise Despointes; Jean-Pierre Cassel	Guy Bourdin
April	Sylvie Vartan	Tony Kent
May	Jane Birkin	Guy Bourdin
June/July	Veruschka	Franco Rubartelli
August	Beska Sorensen	Michael Reinhardt
September	Anny Duperey	Alex Chatelain
October	Catherine Deneuve	Guy Bourdin
November	Marisa Berenson	Helmut Newton
December/January 1974	—N/a	—N/a

=== 1974 ===
Issue	Cover model	Photographer
February	Beska Sorensen	Michael Reinhardt
March	Sylvie Vartan	Guy Bourdin
April	Sydne Rome	Helmut Newton
May	Charlotte Rampling	Hans Feurer
June/July	Jill Kennington	Gian Paolo Barbieri
August	Jane Birkin	Hans Feurer
September	Anna Andersen	Helmut Newton
October	Catherine Deneuve	Helmut Newton
November	Dayle Weston	Alex Chatelain
December/January 1975	Alfred Hitchcock	Philippe Halsman

=== 1975 ===
Issue	Cover model	Photographer
February	Mariella Rhodes	Guy Bourdin
March	Chris O'Connor	Helmut Newton
April	Chris O'Connor	Alex Chatelain
May	Connie McCormmach	Hans Feurer
June/July	Sydne Rome	Helmut Newton
August	Valeska Chabouis	Hans Feurer
September	Dani	Helmut Newton
October	Clio Goldsmith	Karen Radkai
November	Dalila di Lazzaro	Helmut Newton
December/January 1976	Peter Ustinov	

=== 1976 ===
Issue	Cover model	Photographer
February	Sofia Kiukkonen	Hans Feurer
March	Catherine Deneuve	Helmut Newton
April	Dalila di Lazzaro	Helmut Newton
May	Jacqueline Bisset	Karen Radkai
June/July	Arja Töyrylä	Helmut Newton
August	Dayle Haddon	Helmut Newton
September	Dayle Haddon	Helmut Newton
October	Margaux Hemingway	Helmut Newton
November	Charlotte Rampling	Helmut Newton
December/January 1977	—N/a	—N/a

=== 1977 ===
Issue	Cover model	Photographer/Artist
February	Marcie Hunt	Guy Bourdin
March	Mariella Rhodes	Helmut Newton
April	Claire Beresford	Helmut Newton
May	Dalila Di Lazzaro	Jérôme Ducrot
June/July	Lena Kansbod	Arthur Elgort
August	Patti Hansen	Helmut Newton
September	Shaun Casey	Helmut Newton
October	Caroline, Princess of Hanover	Norman Parkinson
November	Catherine Deneuve	Henry Clarke
December/January 1978	—N/a	Marc Chagall

=== 1978 ===
Issue	Cover model	Photographer/Artist
February	Janice Dickinson	Michael Reinhardt
March	—N/a	Helmut Newton
April	Dayle Haddon	Steve Hiett
May	Janice Dickinson	Michael Reinhardt
June/July	Christie Brinkley	Michael Reinhardt
August	Karen Howard	Guy Bourdin
September	Bitten Knudsen	Helmut Newton
October	Eva Wallen	Helmut Newton
November	Kelly Winn	Guy Bourdin
December/January 1979	Lauren Bacall	Jean Negulesco

=== 1979 ===
Issue	Cover model	Photographer/Artist
February	Janice Dickinson	Michael Reinhardt
March	Caroline, Princess of Hanover	Cecil Beaton
April	Gia Carangi	Helmut Newton
May	Debbie Dickinson	Albert Watson
June/July	Janice Dickinson	Michael Reinhardt
August	Susana Giménez	Guy Bourdin
September	Debbie Dickinson	Albert Watson
October	Nastassja Kinski	Peter Knapp
November	Janice Dickinson	Michael Reinhardt
December/January	—N/a	Joan Miró

== 1980s ==
=== 1980 ===
Issue	Cover model	Photographer
February	Janice Dickinson	Michael Reinhardt
March	Patti Hansen	Helmut Newton
April	Gemma Curry	Helmut Newton
May	Debbie Dickinson	Albert Watson
June/July	Beth Todd	Frank Horvat
August	Gia Carangi	Albert Watson
September	Clio Goldsmith	Albert Watson
October	Margaux Hemingway	Helmut Newton
November	Kim Alexis	Arthur Elgort
December/January 1981	scene from Parsifal	Siegfried Lauterwasser

=== 1981 ===
Issue	Cover model	Photographer
February	Andrea Malkiewicz	Albert Watson
March	Eva Voorhees	Albert Watson
April	Andrea Malkiewicz	Albert Watson
May	Carol Alt	Albert Watson
June/July	Kim Alexis	Albert Watson
August	Nancy DeWeir	Albert Watson
September	Lisa Ryall	Albert Watson
October	Andrea Malkiewicz	Albert Watson
November	Maria von Hartz	Albert Watson
December/January 1982	John Huston	Giacomo Manzù

=== 1982 ===
Issue	Cover model	Photographer
February	Jacki Adams	Albert Watson
March	Anette Stai	Francesco Scavullo
April	Isabella Rossellini	Bill King
May	Anette Stai	Francesco Scavullo
June/July	Eva Johansson	Albert Watson
August	Eva Voorhees	Albert Watson
September	Rosemary McGrotha	Bill King
October	Nastassja Kinski	Albert Watson
November	Brooke Shields	Albert Watson
December/January 1983	Orson Welles, uncredited	

=== 1983 ===
Issue	Cover model	Photographer
February	Renée Simonsen	Albert Watson
March	Eva Johansson	Albert Watson
April	Beth Rupert	Albert Watson
May	Renée Simonsen	Albert Watson
June/July	Christie Brinkley	Bert Stern
August	Beth Rupert	Albert Watson
September	Brooke Shields	Patrick Demarchelier
October	Clio Goldsmith	Albert Watson
November	Isabella Rossellini	Patrick Demarchelier
December/January 1984	Princess Caroline of Monaco	Andy Warhol

=== 1984 ===
Issue	Cover model	Photographer
February	Renée Simonsen	Albert Watson
March	Catherine Deneuve	Albert Watson
April	Hunter Reno	Albert Watson
May	Isabelle Adjani	Albert Watson
June/July	Mariel Hemingway	Albert Watson
August	Lisa Hollenbeck	Albert Watson
September	Jerry Hall	Albert Watson
October	Brooke Shields	Albert Watson
November	Kim Alexis	Albert Watson
December/January 1985	scene from La Traviata	Paul Ronald

=== 1985 ===
Issue	Cover model	Photographer/Artist
February	Andrea Kluke	Albert Watson
March	Jenna de Rosnay	Albert Watson
April	Renata Vackova	Albert Watson
May	Catherine Anel	Peter Beard
June/July	—N/a	René Gruau
August	Beth Rupert	Albert Watson
September	Sandra Zatezalo	Albert Watson
October	Paulina Porizkova	Bill King
November	Kim Adams	Albert Watson
December/January 1986	—N/a	David Hockney

=== 1986 ===
Issue	Cover model	Photographer
February	Renée Simonsen	Bill King
March	Paulina Porizkova	Bill King
April	Estelle Lefébure	Bill King
May	Frederique van der Wal	Bill King
June/July	Sharon Stone	Bill King
August	Monika Schnarre	Bill King
September	Princess Stéphanie of Monaco	Helmut Newton
October	Kirsten Allen	Bill King
November	Christy Turlington	Bill King
December/January 1987	Mikhail Baryshnikov	Guy Bourdin

=== 1987 ===
Issue	Cover model	Photographer
February	Cindy Crawford	Bill King
March	Laetitia Firmin-Didot	Bill King
April	Joanna Pacuła	Bill King
May	Kim Basinger	Herb Ritts
June/July	Maria Lindkvist	Bill King
August	Christy Turlington	Bill King
September	Linda Evangelista	Bill King
October	Lori Koebernick	Bill King
November	Vendela Kirsebom	Patrick Demarchelier
December/January 1988	Barbara Hendricks	Elizabeth Novick

=== 1988 ===
Issue	Cover model	Photographer/Artist
February	Estelle Lefébure	Patrick Demarchelier
March		Michael Roberts
April	Linda Evangelista	Patrick Demarchelier
May	Cindy Crawford	Patrick Demarchelier
June/July	Caroline, Princess of Hanover	Bettina Rheims
August	Naomi Campbell	Patrick Demarchelier
September	Michaela Bercu	Patrick Demarchelier
October	Paulina Porizkova	Patrick Demarchelier
November	Isabelle Adjani	Brigitte Lacombe
December/January 1989	—N/a	Akira Kurosawa

=== 1989 ===
Issue	Cover model	Photographer/Artist
February	Linda Evangelista	Peter Lindbergh
March	Joanna Rhodes	Peter Lindbergh
April	Isabelle Pasco	Peter Lindbergh
May	Meryl Streep	Brigitte Lacombe
June/July	Tatjana Patitz	Peter Lindbergh
August	Linda Evangelista	Steven Meisel
September	Cordula Reyer; Naomi Campbell	Peter Lindbergh
October	Isabella Rossellini	Brigitte Lacombe
November	Ornella Muti	Sante D'Orazio
December/January 1990	—N/a	Jean-Jacques Sempé

== 1990s ==
=== 1990 ===
Issue	Cover model	Photographer
February	Linda Evangelista	Arthur Elgort
March	Naomi Campbell	Sante D'Orazio
April	Nadège du Bospertus	Tiziano Magni
May	Vanessa Duve	Tiziano Magni
June/July	Elaine Irwin; Tatjana Patitz	Bruce Weber
August	Fanny Ardant	Brigitte Lacombe
September	Christy Turlington	Brigitte Lacombe
October	Isabella Rossellini	Brigitte Lacombe
November	Ludmila Isaeva	Christian Moser
December/January 1991	Martin Scorsese	Ferdinando Scianna

=== 1991 ===
Issue	Cover model	Photographer/Artist
February	Nadège du Bospertus	Tiziano Magni
March	Linda Evangelista	Patrick Demarchelier
April	Naomi Campbell	Patrick Demarchelier
May	Catherine Deneuve	Peter Lindbergh
June/July	Claudia van Ryssen	Jean Larivière
August	Emmanuelle Béart	Sacha Van Dorssen
September	Heather Stewart-Whyte	Dominique Issermann
October	Inès de la Fressange	Pamela Hanson
November	Vanessa Paradis	Max Vadukul
December/January 1992	—N/a	Antoni Tàpies

=== 1992 ===
Issue	Cover model	Photographer
February	Isabelle Adjani	Dominique Issermann
March	Christy Turlington; Naomi Campbell	Max Vadukul
April	Karen Mulder	Max Vadukul
May	Claudia Schiffer	Dominique Issermann
June/July	Nadja Auermann	Sheila Metzner
August	Annette Bening	Matthew Rolston
September	Heather Stewart-Whyte	Dominique Issermann
October	Claudia Mason	Max Vadukul
November	Helena Christensen	Max Vadukul
December/January 1993	14th Dalai Lama	

=== 1993 ===
Issue	Cover model	Photographer/Artist
February	Janine Giddings	Enrique Badulescu
March	Isabelle Adjani	Dominique Issermann
April	Fanny Ardant	Aldo Rossi
May	Bridget Moynahan	Tiziano Magni
June/July	Andie MacDowell	Max Vadukul
August	Claudia Schiffer	Tiziano Magni
September	Linda Evangelista	Max Vadukul
October	Madonna	Ellen von Unwerth
November	Karen Mulder	Ellen von Unwerth
December/January 1994	Nelson Mandela	Tommy Motswai

=== 1994 ===
Issue	Cover model	Photographer
February	Emmanuelle Béart	Max Vadukul
March	Kate Moss	Paolo Roversi
April	Nina Brosh	Dominique Issermann
May	Carole Bouquet	Dominique Issermann
June/July	Isabelle Adjani	Paolo Roversi
August	Shiraz Tal	Marc Hispard
September	Phoebe O'Brien	Marc Hispard
October	Chrystèle Saint-Louis Augustin	Craig McDean
November	Uma Thurman	Marc Hispard
December/January 1995	Karen Mulder	Michael Thompson

=== 1995 ===
Issue	Cover model	Photographer/Illustrator
February	Meghan Douglas	Mario Testino
March	Anne Pedersen	Mario Testino
April	Stephanie Seymour	Mario Testino
May	Georgina Grenville	Enrique Badulescu
June	Karen Mulder	Satoshi Saïkusa
July	—N/a	Kim Johnson
August	Diane Kruger	Satoshi Saïkusa
September	Juliette Binoche	Satoshi Saïkusa
October	Phoebe O'Brien	Satoshi Saïkusa
November	Phoebe O'Brien	Satoshi Saïkusa
December/January 1996	Nadja Auermann	Michael Thompson

=== 1996 ===
Issue	Cover model	Photographer
February	Carolyn Murphy	Mario Testino
March	Shalom Harlow	Mario Testino
April	Chandra North	Mario Testino
May	Carolyn Murphy	Raymond Meier
June/July	Diane Kruger	Raymond Meier
August	Trish Goff	Satoshi Saïkusa
September	Amber Valletta	Michael Thompson
October	Carolyn Murphy	Michael Thompson
November	Meghan Douglas	Michael Thompson
December/January 1997	Georgianna Robertson	Jean-Baptiste Mondino

=== 1997 ===
Issue	Cover model	Photographer
February	Carolyn Murphy	Michael Thompson
March	Kylie Bax	Michael Thompson
April	Shalom Harlow	Irving Penn
May	Kylie Bax	Perry Ogden
June/July	Sarah Thomas	Enrique Badulescu
August	Chandra North	Michael Thompson
September	Tanga Moreau	Jean-Baptiste Mondino
October	Kate Moss	Michael Thompson
November	Carmen Kass	Michael Thompson
December/January 1998	Karen Elson	Jean-Baptiste Mondino

=== 1998 ===
Issue	Cover model	Photographer
February	Linda Byrne	Eric Traore
March	Carolyn Murphy	Mario Testino
April	Eva Herzigová	Mario Testino
May	Ewa Witkowska	Mario Testino
June/July	Fernanda Tavares	Mario Testino
August	Rachel Roberts	Mario Testino
September	Natalia Semanova	Mario Testino
October	Aurélie Claudel	Mario Testino
November	Elisabet Davidsdottir	Mario Testino
December/January 1999	Audrey Marnay	Mario Testino

=== 1999 ===
Issue	Cover model	Photographer
February	Haylynn Cohen	Mario Testino
March	Kate Moss	Mario Testino
April	Frankie Rayder	Mario Testino
May	Vivien Solari	Mario Testino
June/July	Carolyn Murphy	Mario Testino
August	Gisele Bündchen	Jean-Baptiste Mondino
September	Molly Sims	Ruvén Afanador
October	Carmen Kass	Jean-Baptiste Mondino
November	Angela Lindvall	Jean-Baptiste Mondino
December/January 2000	Linda Nývltová	Jean-Baptiste Mondino

== 2000s ==
=== 2000 ===
Issue	Cover model	Photographer
February	Małgosia Bela	Ruvén Afanador
March	Rhea Durham	Ruvén Afanador
April	Małgosia Bela	Ruvén Afanador
May	Caroline Ribeiro	Ruvén Afanador
June/July	Carolyn Murphy	Ruvén Afanador
August	Ana Cláudia Michels	Richard Burbridge
September	Vivien Solari	Wendelien Daan
October	Heidi Klum	Richard Burbridge
November	Bridget Hall	Richard Burbridge
December/January 2001	Nieves Álvarez	Jean-Baptiste Mondino

=== 2001 ===
Issue	Cover model	Photographer
February	Kate Moss	Mario Testino
March	Karolína Kurková	Nathaniel Goldberg
April	Erin Wasson	Hans Feurer
May	Nataša Vojnović	Greg Kadel
June/July	Carolyn Murphy	Mario Testino
August	Christy Turlington	Inez & Vinoodh
September	Angela Lindvall	Terry Richardson
October	Linda Evangelista	Mario Testino
November	Amber Valletta	Mario Testino
December/January 2002	Kate Moss	Mario Testino

=== 2002 ===
Issue	Cover model	Photographer
February	Filippa Hamilton	Inez & Vinoodh
March	Isabeli Fontana	David Sims
April	Claudia Schiffer	Mario Testino
May	Liya Kebede	Inez & Vinoodh
June/July	Jessica Miller	Inez & Vinoodh
August	Cindy Crawford	Mario Testino
September	Karolína Kurková	Inez & Vinoodh
October	Anne-Catherine Lacroix	Inez & Vinoodh
November	Angela Lindvall	Craig McDean
December/January 2003	Gisele Bündchen	Mario Testino

=== 2003 ===
Issue	Cover model	Photographer
February	Jessica Miller	Inez & Vinoodh
March	Natalia Vodianova	Craig McDean
April	Natalia Vodianova; Werner Schreyer	Mario Testino
May	Kate Moss	Mario Testino
June/July	Milla Jovovich	Mario Testino
August	Sophie Marceau	Inez & Vinoodh
September	Carolyn Murphy	Mario Testino
October	Emmanuelle Seigner	Sam Haskins
November	Diana Dondoe	Inez & Vinoodh
December/January 2004	Catherine Deneuve	Mario Testino

=== 2004 ===
Issue	Cover model	Photographer
February	Erin Wasson	Mario Testino
March	Kate Moss	David Sims
April	Diana Dondoe	David Sims
May	Natasha Poly	Steven Klein
June/July	Natasha Poly	Craig McDean
August	Madonna	Steven Klein
September	Laetitia Casta	David Sims
October	Gisele Bündchen	Mario Sorrenti
November	Kate Moss	Mario Testino
December/January 2005	Sofia Coppola	Mario Testino

=== 2005 ===
Issue	Cover model	Photographer
February	Gemma Ward	Mario Testino
March	Daria Werbowy	David Sims
April	Carolyn Murphy	Mario Sorrenti
May	Julia Stegner	David Sims
June/July	Jeísa Chiminazzo; Isabeli Fontana	Mario Testino
August	Demi Moore	Mario Testino
September	Nicole Kidman	Patrick Demarchelier
October	Gemma Ward; Du Juan	Patrick Demarchelier
November	Freja Beha Erichsen; Solange Wilvert; Natasha Poly; Vlada Roslyakova; Tasha Tilberg; Mariacarla Boscono	Mario Testino
December/January 2006	Kate Moss	Craig McDean

=== 2006 ===
Issue	Cover model	Photographer
February	Mariacarla Boscono; Patricia Schmid	Mario Testino
March	Sharon Stone	David Sims
April	Natalia Vodianova	Patrick Demarchelier
May	Anna Mariya Urajevskaya	Mario Testino
June/July	Jennifer Connelly	David Sims
August	Hilary Rhoda	Mario Testino
September	Jessica Stam; Snejana Onopka; Sasha Pivovarova; Gemma Ward	Craig McDean
October	Natalia Vodianova; Neva Vodianova Portman	Mario Testino
November	Paris Hilton	Mario Testino
December/January 2007	Drew Barrymore	Nick Knight

=== 2007 ===
Issue	Cover model	Photographer
February	Doutzen Kroes; Gaspard Ulliel	Mario Testino
March	Natasha Poly	Inez & Vinoodh
April	Lara Stone	Terry Richardson
May	Sophie Marceau	Mario Testino
June/July	Catherine McNeil	Mario Testino
August	Claudia Schiffer	Mario Testino
September	Natasha Poly	Patrick Demarchelier
October	Gisele Bündchen	Inez & Vinoodh
November	Carolyn Murphy; Andre J.	Bruce Weber
December/January 2008	Charlotte Gainsbourg	Craig McDean

=== 2008 ===
Issue	Cover model	Photographer
February	Naomi Campbell; Kate Moss	Mario Testino
March	Lara Stone	Mert & Marcus
April	Kate Moss	Inez & Vinoodh
May	Julianne Moore	Mario Testino
June/July	Laetitia Casta	Mario Testino
June/July	Noémie Lenoir	Mario Testino
August	Daria Werbowy	Inez & Vinoodh
September	Anna Selezneva	Mert & Marcus
October	Christy Turlington	Inez & Vinoodh
November	Vanessa Paradis	Mert & Marcus
December/January 2009	Princess Stéphanie of Monaco	Mert & Marcus

=== 2009 ===
Issue	Cover model	Photographer
February	Lara Stone	Inez & Vinoodh
March	Iris Strubegger	Mert & Marcus
April	Scarlett Johansson	Mario Sorrenti
May	Daria Werbowy	Inez & Vinoodh
June/July	Anja Rubik	Inez & Vinoodh
August	Daria Werbowy	Inez & Vinoodh
September	Lara Stone	Mert & Marcus
October	Kate Moss	Inez & Vinoodh
November	Isabeli Fontana	David Sims
December/January 2010	Laetitia Casta	Mert & Marcus

== 2010s ==
=== 2010 ===
Issue	Cover model	Photographer
February	Daria Werbowy	Inez & Vinoodh
March	Rose Cordero	Mert & Marcus
April	Natasha Poly	Inez & Vinoodh
May	Kate Winslet; Julianne Moore; Meryl Streep; Gwyneth Paltrow; Naomi Watts; Penélope Cruz	Inez & Vinoodh
May	Penélope Cruz; Meryl Streep	Inez & Vinoodh
May	Penélope Cruz; Bono	Inez & Vinoodh
June/July	Kate Moss	Mario Sorrenti
August	Freja Beha Erichsen	David Sims
September	Marion Cotillard	Mert & Marcus
October	Lara Stone	Mert & Marcus
November	Natasha Poly	Mario Sorrenti
December/January 2011	Daphne Groeneveld; Tom Ford	Mert & Marcus

=== 2011 ===
Issue	Cover model	Photographer
February	Lara Stone	Mario Sorrenti
March	Saskia de Brauw	Mert & Marcus
April	Gisele Bündchen	Inez & Vinoodh
May	Kate Moss	Mert & Marcus
June/July	Isabeli Fontana	Mert & Marcus
August	Lara Stone	Inez & Vinoodh
September	Charlotte Casiraghi	Mario Testino
October	Sasha Pivovarova	Mert & Marcus
November	Arizona Muse	Inez & Vinoodh
December/January 2012	Kate Moss	Mert & Marcus

=== 2012 ===
Issue	Cover model	Photographer
February	Daria Werbowy	Inez & Vinoodh
March	Natalia Vodianova	Mert & Marcus
April	Doutzen Kroes	David Sims
May	Laetitia Casta	Mario Testino
June/July	Gisele Bündchen	Inez & Vinoodh
August	Marion Cotillard	Mario Sorrenti
September	Daria Werbowy	Mert & Marcus
September	Kate Moss	Mert & Marcus
September	Lara Stone	Mert & Marcus
October	Kate Moss; George Michael	Mario Testino
November	Daria Werbowy; Stephanie Seymour; Lauren Hutton	Inez & Vinoodh
December/January 2013	Carla Bruni	Mert & Marcus

=== 2013 ===
Issue	Cover model	Photographer
February	Milla Jovovich	Inez & Vinoodh
March	Suvi Koponen	Mert & Marcus
April	Isabeli Fontana	Mario Testino
May	Freja Beha Erichsen	Inez & Vinoodh
June/July	Andreea Diaconu	Mario Sorrenti
August	Daria Werbowy	David Sims
September	Saskia de Brauw	Mert & Marcus
October	Edita Vilkevičiūtė	Mario Testino
November	Gisele Bündchen	Inez & Vinoodh
December/January 2014	David Beckham, Victoria Beckham	Inez & Vinoodh

=== 2014 ===
Issue	Cover model	Photographer
February	Emily DiDonato	David Sims
March	Lara Stone	Mert & Marcus
April	Cameron Russell	Mario Testino
May	Sophie Marceau	Mario Testino
June/July	Natasha Poly	Inez & Vinoodh
August	Anna Ewers	Mert & Marcus
September	Natalia Vodianova	Mert & Marcus
October	Natasha Poly; Aleksandra Kristina	Mario Testino
November	Adriana Lima	Mert & Marcus
December/January 2015	Inès de La Fressange	Mert & Marcus

=== 2015 ===
Issue	Cover model	Photographer
February	Anna Ewers	David Sims
March	Daria Werbowy; Kate Moss; Lara Stone	Mert & Marcus
April	Charlotte Casiraghi	Mario Testino
May	Liya Kebede	Inez & Vinoodh
June/July	Daria Werbowy	David Sims
August	Anna Ewers	Inez & Vinoodh
September	Natasha Poly	Mert & Marcus
October	Christy Turlington	Inez & Vinoodh
October	Gisele Bündchen	Mario Testino
October	Kate Moss	Mert & Marcus
October	Kendall Jenner	David Sims
November	Mica Argañaraz	Mario Testino
December/January 2016	Vanessa Paradis	David Sims
December/January 2016	Vanessa Paradis	Inez & Vinoodh
December/January 2016	Vanessa Paradis	Karim Sadli

=== 2016 ===
Issue	Cover model	Photographer
February	Edie Campbell	Inez & Vinoodh
March	Gigi Hadid	Mert & Marcus
April	Cindy Crawford; Kaia Gerber	Mario Testino
May	Lottie Moss; Lucky Blue Smith	Mario Testino
June/July	Iselin Steiro	Mikael Jansson
August	Luna Bijl	David Sims
September	Taylor Hill; Bella Hadid	Mert & Marcus
October	Luna Bijl	David Sims
November	Gigi Hadid	Mario Testino
December/January 2017	Karl Lagerfeld; Lily-Rose Depp	Hedi Slimane

=== 2017 ===
Issue	Cover model	Photographer
February	Anna Ewers	David Sims
March	Valentina Sampaio	Mert & Marcus
April	Christy Turlington	Inez & Vinoodh
May	Vittoria Ceretti	Mario Testino
June/July	Gisele Bündchen	Mario Testino
August	Gisele Bündchen	Inez & Vinoodh
September	Edie Campbell	David Sims
October	Cara Delevingne	David Sims
November	Rianne van Rompaey	Inez & Vinoodh
December/January 2018	Rihanna	Inez & Vinoodh
December/January 2018	Rihanna	Jean-Paul Goude
December/January 2018	Rihanna	Juergen Teller

=== 2018 ===
Issue	Cover model	Photographer
February	Kaia Gerber	David Sims
March	Grace Elizabeth	David Sims
April	Alma Jodorowsky	Inez & Vinoodh
May	Anna Ewers	Mikael Jansson
June/July	Edie Campbell	Mikael Jansson
August	Iselin Steiro	David Sims
September	Christy Turlington	Inez & Vinoodh
September	Naomi Campbell	Mikael Jansson
September	Kate Moss	Mikael Jansson
October	Kaia Gerber	Mikael Jansson
November	Natasha Poly	Inez & Vinoodh
December/January 2019	Jane Birkin; Lou Doillon; Charlotte Gainsbourg	Lachlan Bailey

=== 2019 ===
Issue	Cover model	Photographer
February	Erika Linder	Mikael Jansson
March	Rianne van Rompaey	David Sims
April	Adut Akech	Inez & Vinoodh
April	Andreea Diaconu	Inez & Vinoodh
April	Raquel Zimmermann	Inez & Vinoodh
May	Rianne van Rompaey	Mikael Jansson
June/July	Gisele Bündchen	Mikael Jansson
August	Kate Moss	Inez & Vinoodh
September	Rianne van Rompaey	Alasdair McLellan
September	Rianne van Rompaey	Inez & Vinoodh
September	Rianne van Rompaey	Juergen Teller
September	Rianne van Rompaey	Mikael Jansson
October	Laurijn Bijnen	David Sims
November	Erika Linder	Mikael Jansson
December/January 2020	Virginie Efira	Mikael Jansson

== 2020s ==
=== 2020 ===
Issue	Cover model	Photographer
February	Jill Kortleve	Inez & Vinoodh
March	Rebecca Leigh Longendyke	Mikael Jansson
March	Vittoria Ceretti	Mikael Jansson
April	Marion Cotillard	Lachlan Bailey
May/June	Bella Hadid	Inez & Vinoodh
May/June	Gigi Hadid	Inez & Vinoodh
July	Mica Argañaraz	Nathaniel Goldberg
July	Natasja Madsen	Henrik Purienne
August	Natalia Vodianova	Nathaniel Goldberg
September	Malika Louback	Mikael Jansson
October	Rianne Van Rompaey	Carlijn Jacobs
November	Rianne Van Rompaey	Mikael Jansson
December/January 2021	Léa Seydoux	Alasdair McLellan
December/January 2021	Léa Seydoux	Inez & Vinoodh
December/January 2021	Léa Seydoux	Craig McDean

=== 2021 ===
Issue	Cover model	Photographer
February	Anna Ewers	Inez & Vinoodh
March	Quinn Mora	David Sims
April	Nora Attal	Inez & Vinoodh
May	Hailey Bieber	David Sims
June/July	Imaan Hammam	Inez & Vinoodh
August	Mica Argañaraz	Mikael Jansson
September	Tindi Mar	Mikael Jansson
October		Guy Bourdin
November	Aya Nakamura	Carlijn Jacobs
December/January 2022	Isabelle Huppert	Paolo Roversi

=== 2022 ===
Issue	Cover model	Photographer
February	Lola Nicon; Malika Louback; Mika Schneider	Charlotte Wales
March	Laetitia Casta	Carlijn Jacobs
April	Akon Changkou	Anthony Seklaoui
May	Hailey Bieber	Karim Sadli
June/July	Raquel Zimmermann	Theo de Gueltzl
August	Ugbad Abdi; Mona Tougaard	Luis Alberto Rodriguez
September	Kate Moss	Carlijn Jacobs
October	Lous and the Yakuza	Anthony Seklaoui
November	Grace Elizabeth	Angelo Pennetta
December/January 2023	Lily Collins	Maciek Pozoga

=== 2023 ===
Issue	Cover model	Photographer
February	Angèle	Oliver Hadlee Pearch
March	Jisoo	Hugo Comte
April	Beyoncé	Louie Banks
May	Mona Tougaard	Théo de Gueltzl
June/July	Vittoria Ceretti	Oliver Hadlee Pearch
August	Ajok Daing	Larissa Hofmann
September	Dua Lipa	Mert Alas
October	Malika El Maslouhi	Malick Bodian
November	Victoria Beckham	Lachlan Bailey
December/January 2024	Ida Heiner	Théo de Gueltzl

=== 2024 ===
Issue	Cover model	Photographer
February	Chloë Sevigny	Larissa Hoffman
March	Liu Wen	Julien Martinez Leclerc
April	Sophie Marceau	Quentin De Briey
May	Celine Dion	Cass Blackbird
June/July	Gigi Hadid	Bardia Zeinali
August	Kendall Jenner	Mert & Marcus
September	Vivienne Rohner	Steven Meisel
October	Anok Yai	Mikael Jansson
November	Anne Hathaway	Quentin de Briey
December/January 2025	Loli Bahia	Mert & Marcus

=== 2025 ===
Issue	Cover model	Photographer
February	Natasha Poly	Willy Vanderperre
March	Addison Rae	Mario Sorrenti
April	Vittoria Ceretti	Carin Backoff
May	Joan Smalls	Mario Sorrenti
May	Adriana Lima	Mario Sorrenti
May	Lara Stone	Mario Sorrenti
June/July (digital)	Imaan Hammam	Mario Sorrenti
June/July	Gisele Bündchen	Mario Sorrenti
August	Anok Yai	Mario Sorrenti
September	Jeanne Cadieu	Steven Meisel
September	Ella McCutcheon	Karim Sadli
October	Kim Kardashian	Anthony Seklaoui
November	Miley Cyrus	Mario Sorrenti
December/January 2026	Mona Tougaard; Irina Shayk	Carin Backoff

=== 2026 ===
Issue	Cover model	Photographer
February	Doutzen Kroes	Richard Burbridge
March	Kendall Jenner	Renell Medrano
April	Chase Infiniti	Rahim Fortune
May	Libby Taverner	Mikael Jansson
June/July	Natalia Vodianova	Angelo Pennetta
August	Cindy Bruna	Purienne
August	Adèle Exarchopoulos	Purienne
August	Lennon Sorrenti	Purienne
September	Gigi Hadid	Willy Vanderperre
October	Awar Odhiang	Willy Vanderperre
November	Amelia Gray	Steven Klein

== Cover rankings ==
=== Photographers ===
as of December 2025/January 2026 issue
Rank	Photographer	Number of Covers
1	Mario Testino	68
2	Inez & Vinoodh	55
3	Henry Clarke	52
4	Helmut Newton	45
5	Guy Bourdin	26

=== Cover models ===
as of December 2025/January 2026 issue
Rank	Cover Model	Number of Covers
1	Kate Moss	22
2	Catherine Deneuve	16
3	Gisele Bündchen	12
3	Natasha Poly	12
4	Carolyn Murphy	11
4	Daria Werbowy	11
5	Christy Turlington	9

== See also ==
- List of Vogue France guest editors
- List of Harper's Bazaar France cover models
- List of L'Officiel cover models
