= List of Harper's Bazaar France cover models =

This list of Harper's Bazaar France cover models (1983–1991; 2023–present) is a catalog of cover models who have appeared on the cover of Harper's Bazaar France, the French edition of American fashion magazine Harper's Bazaar.

== 1980s ==
=== 1983 ===
| Issue | Cover model | Photographer | Ref. |
|---|---|---|---|
| January/February | Dayle Haddon | James Moore | |
| March/April | Julie Wolfe | James Moore | |
| May/June | Julie Floyd | James Moore | |
| July/August | Rene Russo | | |
| September/October | Susan Smith | James Moore | |
| November/December | Frauke Quast | James Moore | |

=== 1984 ===
| Issue | Cover model | Photographer | Ref. |
|---|---|---|---|
| January/February | Marisa Berenson | Les Goldberg | |
| March/April | Janice Dickinson | James Moore | |
| May/June | Lori Singer | | |
| July/August | Frauke Quast | Les Goldberg | |
| September/October | Lauren Hutton | Les Goldberg | |
| November/December | Juli Foster | Les Goldberg | |

=== 1985 ===
| Issue | Cover model | Photographer | Ref. |
|---|---|---|---|
| January/February | Carol Alt | Bill Connors | |
| March/April | Jerry Hall | Stan Malinowski | |
| May/June | | | |
| July/August | Nabila Khashoggi | | |
| September/October | Sydne Rome | | |
| November/December | | | |

=== 1986 ===
| Issue | Cover model | Photographer | Ref. |
|---|---|---|---|
| January/February | Pam Ross | | |
| March/April | Tina Chow | Joe Eula | |
| May/June | Claude Heidemeyer | | |
| July/August | Joanna Pacula | | |
| September/October | Larisa Fielding | Marco Glaviano | |
| November/December | Carole Bouquet | | |

=== 1987 ===
| Issue | Cover model | Photographer | Ref. |
|---|---|---|---|
| February | Diandra Douglas | Marco Glaviano | |
| March/April | | | |
| May/June | Kenna Lampman | | |
| July/August | Joanna Pacula | | |
| September | Mounia Orosemane | | |
| December | Cindy Crawford | Marco Glaviano | |

=== 1988 ===
| Issue | Cover model | Photographer | Ref. |
|---|---|---|---|
| March/April | Sandra Barnett | James Moore | |
| May/June | Isabella Rossellini | | |
| October | | | |
| December | Sandra Barnett | | |

=== 1989 ===
| Issue | Cover model | Photographer | Ref. |
|---|---|---|---|
| March | Rosie Boyaz de la Cruz | James Moore | |
| April | Tammy Hutson | | |
| September | Janine Giddings | | |
| October/November | Natalie Bachmann | | |
| December | Meghan Douglas | | |

=== 1990 ===
| Issue | Cover model | Photographer | Ref. |
|---|---|---|---|
| March | Stephanie Schneider | Guy Bourdin | |
| April | Mette Andersen | | |
| September | | Terence Donovan | |
| October/November | Jean Pelton | | |

=== 1991 ===
| Issue | Cover model | Photographer | Ref. |
|---|---|---|---|
| March | Demetra Hampton | Guy Bourdin | |
| August | Alexandra Aubin | | |

== 2020s ==
=== 2023 ===
| Issue | Cover model | Photographer | Ref. |
|---|---|---|---|
| March | Loli Bahia | Mario Sorrenti | |
| March | Jeanne Cadieu | Mario Sorrenti | |
| March | Rebecca Leigh Longendyke | Mario Sorrenti | |
| March | Alaato Jazyper | Mario Sorrenti | |
| April | Rianne Van Rompaey | Alasdair McLellan | |
| May | Imaan Hammam | Robin Galiegue | |
| June/July | Eva Herzigová | Mario Sorrenti | |
| June/July | Jill Kortleve | Mario Sorrenti | |
| June/July | Angelina Kendall | Mario Sorrenti | |
| June/July | Awar Odhiang | Mario Sorrenti | |
| August | Laetitia Casta | Deo Suveera | |
| September | Catherine Deneuve | Pamela Dimitrov, Deo Suveera | |
| September | Kendall Jenner | Mario Sorrenti | |
| October | Amelia Gray | Karim Sadli | |
| November | Vanessa Paradis | Alasdair McLellan | |
| December/January 2024 | Loli Bahia | Juergen Teller | |
| December/January 2024 | Charlotte Gainsbourg | Juergen Teller | |

=== 2024 ===
| Issue | Cover model | Photographer | Ref. |
|---|---|---|---|
| February | Karolina Spakowski | Alasdair McLellan | |
| March | Edie Campbell | David Sims | |
| March | Kate Moss | Robin Galiegue | |
| March | Iselin Steiro | David Sims | |
| April | Kaia Gerber | Alasdair McLellan | |
| May | Mica Arganaraz | Karim Sadli | |
| May | Naomi Campbell | Karim Sadli | |
| June/July | Devyn Garcia, Angelina Kendall, Ella McCutcheon, Awar Odhiang | Mario Sorrenti | |
| August | Zaho de Sagazan | Oliver Hadlee Pearch | |
| September | Layla Etengan | David Sims | |
| September | Mathilda Gvarliani | David Sims | |
| October | Małgosia Bela | Karim Sadli | |
| October | Irina Shayk | Anthony Seklaoui | |
| November | Gigi Hadid | Robin Galiegue | |
| December/January 2025 | Laetitia Casta | Juergen Teller | |

=== 2025 ===
| Issue | Cover model | Photographer | Ref. |
|---|---|---|---|
| February | Charlotte Gainsbourg | Mark Kean | |
| March | Rihanna | Luis Alberto Rodriguez | |
| March | Lulu Tenney | Johnny Dufort | |
| April | Rianne van Rompaey | Carlijn Jacobs | |
| May | Nastassia Legrand | Sean Thomas | |
| June/July | Rebecca Leigh Longendyke | Henrik Purienne | |
| August | Margot Robbie | Colin Dodgson | |
| September | Kate Moss | David Sims | |
| September | Adèle Exarchopoulos | David Sims | |
| October | Ella Dalton | David Sims | |
| October | Abbey Lee | Willy Vanderperre | |
| October | Libby Taverner | Drew Vickers | |
| November | Cindy Crawford | Dudi Hasson | |
| December/January 2026 | Jacqui Hooper | Drew Vickers | |

=== 2026 ===
| Issue | Cover model | Photographer | Ref. |
|---|---|---|---|
| February | Léa Seydoux | Colin Dodgson | |
| March | Loli Bahia | Karim Sadli | |
| March | Irina Shayk | Willy Vanderperre | |
| March | Binx Walton | Senta Simond | |
| April | Vanessa Paradis | Karim Sadli | |
| May | Julianne Moore | Mario Sorrenti | |
| June/July | Mona Tougaard | Alasdair McLellan | |
| June/July | Vittoria Ceretti | Mark Kean | |
| August | Charlotte Cardin | Théo de Gueltzl | |
| September | Celine Dion | Robin Galiegue | |
| October | Loli Bahia | Juergen Teller | |
| October | Alina Miller | Alasdair McLellan | |
| October | Rianne van Rompaey | Mikael Jansson | |
| November | Awar Odhiang | Theo Sion | |

== See also ==
- List of Vogue France cover models
- List of L'Officiel cover models
