= List of Vogue France guest editors =

This list of Vogue France guest editors is a catalog of guest editors who have taken on the role of Editor-in-Chief/Head of Editorial Content of French fashion magazine Vogue France, (Note: As Vogue Paris till 2021) either due to invitation or other reasons which lead to the editor-in-chief not being able to edit the magazine.

== 1960s ==
Guest editor	Issue	Cover model/s	Photographer	Cover subtitle	Ref.
Françoise Sagan	December 1969/January 1970	Louise Despointes, Suzanne	Guy Bourdin	Très Spécial 1970 Imaginé par Françoise Sagan	

== 1970s ==
Guest editor	Issue	Cover model/s	Photographer/s	Cover subtitle	Ref.
Jeanne Moreau	December 1970/January 1971	Jeanne Moreau	Helmut Newton	Numero Special Imagine par Jeanne Moreau	
Salvador Dalí	December 1971/January 1972	Marilyn Monroe, Mao Zedong	Salvador Dalí, Philippe Halsman	—N/a	
Salvador Dalí	December 1971/January 1972	Salvador Dalí	Salvador Dalí	Numéro de Cinquantenaire 1921/1971 réalisé par Salvador Dalí	
Federico Fellini	December 1972/January 1973	Giulietta Masina	Franco Pinna	Fellini	
Marlene Dietrich	December 1973/January 1974	—N/a	—N/a	par Marlene Dietrich	
Alfred Hitchcock	December 1974/January 1975	Alfred Hitchcock	Philippe Halsman	par Hitchcock	
Peter Ustinov	December 1975/January 1976	Peter Ustinov		par Peter Ustinov	
Roman Polanski	December 1976/January 1977	—N/a	—N/a	par Roman Polanski	
Marc Chagall	December 1977/January 1978	—N/a	Marc Chagall	par Marc Chagall	
Lauren Bacall	December 1978/January 1979	Lauren Bacall	Jean Negulesco	par Lauren Bacall	
Joan Miró	December 1979/January 1980	—N/a	Joan Miró	par Miró	

== 1980s ==
Guest editor	Issue	Cover model/s	Photographer/Artist	Cover subtitle	Ref.
Herbert von Karajan	December 1980/January 1981	scene from Parsifal	Siegfried Lauterwasser	par Herbert von Karajan	
John Huston	December 1981/January 1982	John Huston	Giacomo Manzù	par John Huston	
Orson Welles	December 1982/January 1983	uncredited, Orson Welles	Oja Kodar	par Orson Welles	
Princess Caroline of Monaco	December 1983/January 1984	Princess Caroline of Monaco	Andy Warhol	par Caroline de Monaco	
Franco Zeffirelli	December 1984/January 1985	scene from La Traviata	Paul Ronald	par Zeffirelli	
David Hockney	December 1985/January 1986	—N/a	David Hockney	par David Hockney	
Mikhail Baryshnikov	December 1986/January 1987	Mikhail Baryshnikov	Guy Bourdin	par Baryshnikov	
Barbara Hendricks	December 1987/January 1988	Barbara Hendricks	Elizabeth Novick	par Barbara Hendricks	
Akira Kurosawa	December 1988/January 1989	—N/a	Akira Kurosawa	par Kurosawa	
Mstislav Rostropovich	December 1989/January 1990	—N/a	Jean-Jacques Sempé	par Rostropovich	

== 1990s ==
Guest editor	Issue	Cover model	Photographer/Artist	Cover subtitle	Ref.
Martin Scorsese	December 1990/January 1991	Martin Scorsese	Ferdinando Scianna	par Martin Scorsese	
Antoni Tàpies	December 1991/January 1992	—N/a	Antoni Tàpies	par Tàpies	
Dalai Lama	December 1992/January 1993	Dalai Lama		par le Dalaï-Lama	
Nelson Mandela	December 1993/January 1994	Nelson Mandela	Tommy Motswai	par Nelson Mandela	

== 2000s ==
Guest editor	Issue	Cover model	Photographer/s	Cover subtitle	Ref.
Catherine Denevue	December 2003/January 2004	Catherine Denevue	Mario Testino	par Catherine Denevue	
Sofia Coppola	December 2004/January 2005	Sofia Coppola	Mario Testino	Mise en Scene: Sofia Coppola	
Kate Moss	December 2005/January 2006	Kate Moss	Craig McDean	Kate Moss, Scandaleuse Beauté	
Drew Barrymore, John Galliano	December 2006/January 2007	Drew Barrymore	Nick Knight	Noël dans la peau de John Galliano	
Charlotte Gainsbourg	December 2007/January 2008	Charlotte Gainsbourg	Craig McDean	Au Charme et Caetera	
Princess Stéphanie of Monaco	December 2008/January 2007	Princess Stéphanie of Monaco	Mert Alas & Marcus Piggott	par Stéphanie de Monaco	
Laetitia Casta	December 2009/January 2010	Laetitia Casta	Mert Alas & Marcus Piggott	Viva Casta!	

== 2010s ==
Guest editor/s	Issue	Cover model/s	Photographer/s	Cover subtitle	Ref.
Penélope Cruz	May 2010	Kate Winslet, Julianne Moore, Meryl Streep, Gwyneth Paltrow, Naomi Watts, Penélope Cruz	Inez and Vinoodh	Numéro special par Penélope Cruz	
Penélope Cruz	May 2010	Penélope Cruz, Meryl Streep	Inez and Vinoodh	Numéro special par Penélope Cruz	
Penélope Cruz	May 2010	Penélope Cruz, Bono	Inez and Vinoodh	Numéro special par Penélope Cruz	
Tom Ford	December 2010/January 2011	Daphne Groeneveld, Tom Ford	Mert Alas & Marcus Piggott	Joyeux Noël monsieur Ford	
Carla Bruni	December 2012/January 2013	Carla Bruni	Mert Alas & Marcus Piggott	Invitée d'honneur Carla Bruni	
Victoria Beckham	December 2013/January 2014	Victoria Beckham, David Beckham	Inez & Vinoodh	Invitée d'honneur Victoria Beckham	
Inès de La Fressange	December 2014/January 2015	Inès de La Fressange	Mert Alas & Marcus Piggott	Invitée d'honneur Inès de La Fressange	
Vanessa Paradis	December 2015/January 2016	Vanessa Paradis	Inez & Vinoodh	Invitée d'honneur Vanessa Paradis	
Vanessa Paradis	December 2015/January 2016	Vanessa Paradis	David Sims	Invitée d'honneur Vanessa Paradis	
Vanessa Paradis	December 2015/January 2016	Vanessa Paradis	Karim Sadli	Invitée d'honneur Vanessa Paradis	
Karl Lagerfeld	December 2016/January 2017	Karl Lagerfeld, Lily-Rose Depp	Hedi Slimane	Invitée d'honneur Karl Lagerfeld	
Rihanna	December 2017/January 2018	Rihanna	Jean-Paul Goude	Rihanna with Love!	
Rihanna	December 2017/January 2018	Rihanna	Inez & Vinoodh	Rihanna Classé Confidentiel	
Rihanna	December 2017/January 2018	Rihanna	Juergen Teller	Rihanna Version Originale	
Jane Birkin, Lou Doillon, Charlotte Gainsbourg	December 2018/January 2019	Jane Birkin, Lou Doillon, Charlotte Gainsbourg	Lachlan Bailey	Le Clan Birkin	
Virginie Efira	December 2019/January 2020	Virginie Efira	Mikael Jansson	Invitée d'honneur Virginie Efira	

== 2020s ==
Guest editor	Issue	Cover model	Photographer/s	Cover subtitle	Ref.
Léa Seydoux	December 2020/January 2021	Léa Seydoux	Inez & Vinoodh	par Léa Seydoux	
Léa Seydoux	December 2020/January 2021	Léa Seydoux	Alasdair McLellan	par Léa Seydoux	
Léa Seydoux	December 2020/January 2021	Léa Seydoux	Craig McDean	par Léa Seydoux	
Claire Thomson-Jonville	December 2024/January 2025	Loli Bahia	Mert Alas & Marcus Piggott	La Renaissance du Chic	
Claire Thomson-Jonville	February 2025	Natasha Poly	Willy Vanderperre	Mode Absolue	

== See also ==
- Charlotte Gainsbourg, the only person to guest edit the magazine more than once, excluding Claire Thomson-Jonville (Dec 07/Jan 08 and Dec 18/Jan 19)
- Claire Thomson-Jonville, the only guest editor who has gone on to become the Editor-in-Chief of the magazine
