= Nicole de Lamargé =

French model (d. 21 April 1969)

Nicole Salvège de Lamargé
- Born: France
- Died: April 21, 1969; Agadir, Morocco
- Occupation: Model
- Years active: ~1950s–1969
- Children: 1

Nicole Salvège de Lamargé (d. 21 April 1969) was a French model. She was one of the most famous models of the 1960s, featuring on the covers of Elle, Jardin des Modes, L'Officiel, Queen, Vogue Paris, and more. The Manchester Evening News, regarded her as one of the most well-known faces in France, behind only Brigitte Bardot and Charles de Gaulle. Emmanuel d'Astier stated she was the "Queen" of models.

== Early life and education ==
Her year and date of birth are unclear, reported as 1933 by Cahiers du Musée National d'Art Moderne, 1937 or 1938 by Le Nouvel Adam, 1939 or 1940 by Mademoiselle, and in her Hispano Americano obituary she was declared to be 33-years old (born in 1935 or 1936).

Her family comes from the Cantal department of France, her last name Salvège de Lamargé comes from a relative known who worked as a tollman known as "la Sauvage de la Marché" (transl. the Savage of the March). Raised in the Vincennes commune near Paris, her family struggled to make ends meet. She was raised in a "religious manner" by her non-practicing Catholic parents. At age twelve she began attending L'école de La Providence Passy on Rue de la Pompe.

== Career ==
de Lamargé began her career learning illustration and then posing as a live model. She began modelling beachwear for fashion houses where she was discovered by a Jardin des Modes editor and did her first photoshoot at age eighteen for the cover of the Jardin des Modes supplement Les Juniors. In 1958, she was scouted by the Catherine Harlé agency. Other models of the agency later included Marianne Faithfull, Amanda Lear and Veruschka, the agency was also referenced in Les play boys by Jacques Dutronc.

Catherine Harlé later said that Lamargé started her agency, being its first star model:

French: Le véritable départ se fit quand, par bonheur, j'ai rencontré une jeune Française de toutes les qualités et de quelques défauts qui nous sont propres : Nicole de Lamargé

[The true start happened when, by chance, I met a young French woman gifted with all the qualities and some of the faults that are specific to us : Nicole de Lamargé]

Lamargés first photoshoots were for Jardin des Modes and French Vogue. It was Elle that she became the star and unofficial face of. A favourite of Elle editor-in-chief Hélène Gordon-Lazareff. She began working closely with her boyfriend photographer and Elle art director Peter Knapp across multiple publications (including The Sunday Times). She also found success in the United Kingdom working with, Norman Parkinson, David Bailey, Brian Duffy, John French, Guy Bourdin, and others. She was photographed by Jeanloup Sieff, Willy Rizzo, F. C. Gundlach, and featured in editorials for Queen, L'Officiel, Mademoiselle, Life, and more. She was featured in a Queen editorial alongside The Rolling Stones.

Lamargé was known for her ability to transform herself saying to Penny Graham in 1969 'I keep changing my look … you see, I get very bored with my face I don't even think about the change any more. It's just instinct'. Brigid Keenan called her a 'master of make-up' who could transform her face in dozens of ways. Whilst Grace Coddington called her a 'chameleon'. This was demonstrated in an infamous 1966 photoshoot by Peter Knapp, which featured de Lamargé before and after putting on makeup.

Following the divorce of Paulene Stone and photographer Antony Norris in December 1965, Stone accused de Lamargé of being "the other woman" and reason for the divorce.

After she was featured on the cover of Elle in 1966 wearing pink crepe blouse by Cacharel, over 10,000 copies of the blouse were sold launching Cacharel into success.

== Personal life ==
At age 21 she married, later separating as her career progressed. She then married a Yugoslav man, de Lamargé was also partner of Swiss fashion photographer Peter Knapp. She later married the journalist and author Jean-Pierre de Lucovich.

She had one child named Bertrand, born in the early 1960s.

== Death ==
On 21 April 1969, de Lamargé died in a car accident whilst learning to drive in Agadir, Morocco. At the time she was on holiday with her husband Jean-Pierre de Lucovich.

== Filmography ==
=== Television ===
| Year | Title | Role | Notes | Ref. |
|---|---|---|---|---|
| 1968 | Dim Dam Dom | Herself (host) | 22 November episode | |
| 1969 | Dim Dam Dom | Herself | 17 January episode | |
| 2023 | Rembob'Ina | Herself | Archival footage | |

== Legacy ==
Following her death she was featured in Goodbye Baby and Amen, a photobook by David Bailey celebrating the 1960s.

Grace Coddington has said that during the 1960s de Lamargé was her idol. In 1977, Charles Castle said that she was one of the top four French models alongside Bettina, Simone D'Aillencourt and Praline (Praline died in a car accident in 1952). Her "blue wave" Elle cover by Brian Duffy was referenced in the 2023 book Night Train to Marrakech by Dinah Jefferies.
