= Alex Aikiu =

French artist and stylist

Alex Aikiu (born 28 November 1978) is a French multidisciplinary artist and stylist.

== Biography ==
Alex Aikiu was born in Bourges on 28 November 1978. In 1986 he began studying music with a private teacher in Beaune in Burgundy. Between 1987 and 1989, he studied at the Musical Federation of the Center region (France) where he practiced music theory, piano and singing. In 1998 he enrolled in Paris II law school. In 1999 he signed his first contract as a musician/performer at Sony Columbia France.

His first musical project was The Aikiu, a Parisian trio formed by Alex Aikiu (vocals), Julien Vichnievsky (guitar, keyboard), and Barnabé Nuytten (bass, keyboard). They released 2 EPs between 2012 and 2013 on Abracadabra Records, and the Ghost Youth LP in 2013 on Sony/Jive/Epic. They collaborated with music producers Pilooski, Guillaume Brière as well as Eric D. Clark. The album features a duet with Isabelle Adjani and Jd Samson. It reached the top 4 in the French charts upon its release, followed in 2015 by the EP Win, released in the US on the Atlas Chair Records label. As of 2022, he is working on a solo music project.

In addition to music, Aikiu has contributed as a stylist, editor, and conceptualist for fashion publications such as Mixte magazine, Elle France, Harper’s Bazaar US, V magazine, Bon magazine, Süddeutsche Zeitung, and for fashion houses such as Chanel, Kenzo and Lacoste.

He has collaborated with photographers such as Rankin, Karl Lagerfeld, Bryan Adams, Lee Jenkins, Horst Diekgerdes, Satoshi Saïkusa and Jean Paul Goude, and with artists such as Juliette Binoche, Catherine Deneuve, Lady Gaga, Kim Kardashian and Naomi Campbell.

In 2021, he curated a group show at the Caméléon Boutique/Galerie in Paris, where he exhibited his first photographs. His photographic work oscillates between fashion, still life and portrait photography. In 2022 his first series of haute couture photographs was published by the fashion magazine Flaunt.
