= Chris O'Connor =

Chris O'Connor may refer to:

- Chris O'Connor (actor), American actor, comedian, and writer, known for Tires
- Chris O'Connor (diplomat) (born 1968), British diplomat
- Chris O'Connor (soccer) (born 1985), Australian football goalkeeper
- Chris O'Connor (model), female model, see List of Vogue Paris cover models
- Chris O'Connor (musician) (born 1965), American vocalist, guitarist, and bassist
