= Pugnido Refugee Camp =

Refuge camp in Ethiopia

Aw-barre Refugee Camp
- camp
- Location of Gambela in Ethiopia

- Location in Ethiopia
- Coordinates: 7°59′27″N 34°06′48″E
- Country: Ethiopia
- Region: Somali Region

Population
  - Total: ~65,000 refugees

Pugnido refugee camp is a refugee camp located in the Gambela region of western Ethiopia and stands as the oldest established refugee camp in the region and one of the biggest in Africa. It has been a sanctuary for South Sudan refugees who migrated in various waves, starting in 1993. It has provided shelter for those who sought refuge in the aftermath of conflicts that occurred in their country of origin mainly after December 2013.

== History ==
Pugnido Refugee Camp was established in 1993 as a means of accommodating refugees who were escaping the civil war in South Sudan. Since its inception, it has served as a secure sanctuary for individuals from South Sudan who have been compelled to flee their homeland due to various conflicts.

== Location ==
Pugnido Refugee Camp is located in the Gambella Region of Western Ethiopia.

== Demographics ==
As of May 2019, Pugnido Refugee Camp accommodated a total of 68,176 individuals seeking refuge, with the majority comprising South Sudanese nationals. As of March 2020, it accommodated a total of 42,749 individuals, and 43,033 individuals by May 2020.

== Facilities ==
The camp provides basic services such as food, water, shelter, and medical care to its residents. The camp also has schools and vocational training centers to provide education and skills to the refugees.

== Challenges ==
The camp faces several challenges such as overcrowding, inadequate funding, and limited resources. The camp is also prone to flooding during the rainy season, which poses a risk to the health and safety of the refugees.

== See also ==
- Bambasi Refugee Camp
- Bokolmayo
- Dolo Odo
