= Marie-Hélène Arnaud =

French actress and model (1934–1986)

- Arnaud modelling a Chanel suit, 1958
- Born: Marie-Hélène Françoise Arnaud; 24 September 1934; Montmorency, Val-d'Oise, France
- Died: 6 October 1986 (aged 52); Paris, France
- Burial place: Monchy-Humières, France
- Occupation(s): Model, actress

Marie-Hélène Françoise Arnaud (French pronunciation: [maʁi elɛn fʁɑ̃swaz aʁno]; 24 September 1934 – 6 October 1986) was a French model and actress. Working as a house model for the French fashion house Chanel, she was the "face of Chanel" in the 1950s; she also developed a second career as an actress.

== Life ==
Arnaud was born on 24 September 1934 in Montmorency in the northern suburbs of Paris. During her time as a model and actress she had high-profile relationships with actor Robert Hossein and film producer Sam Spiegel, and was linked with French politician Georges Pompidou and writer and politician André Malraux. She was found dead in her bath on 6 October 1986 in Paris, France, with the cause of death unknown, and was buried in Monchy-Humières, near Estrées-Saint-Denis.

== Modelling ==
=== Chanel ===
The French designer Coco Chanel launched her first post-war collection at her rue Cambon showroom in Paris on 5 February 1954. For the show she approached Marie-Hélène de Rothschild to ask her friends whether they would appear on the catwalk; Chanel had decided to use "personalities", women "with bosoms and hips – with a real shape – they must have elegance", rather than the sylphlike and anonymous models she had employed pre-war whose function was to bring attention to the clothes rather than themselves, following her precept that just as a watch tells the time, a model should "tell the dress".

This troupe of " personality" models included Marie-Eugênia "Mimi" Ouro Preto, later wife of the novelist Count Guy d'Arcangues; Claude de Leusse, later a journalist and novelist; Princess Odile de Cröy, who would subsequently become social secretary to French President Georges Pompidou; and the relatively unknown Arnaud, who first worked for Chanel when she was seventeen, having just completed her baccalauréat in philosophy, and who was a "reincarnation of the lovely [Marthe] Davelli" (the opera-singer friend of Chanel from her very earliest days as a designer). This group worked during the 1950s as "brand ambassadors" for Chanel, and in exchange for their formidable range of contacts within Paris, were allowed to keep – and thereby promote – the latest fashions that they modelled, hence the name they were given, les blousons Chanel.

The 1954 comeback collection received a "venomous" reception from the French press, not only because Chanel had yet to regain her reputation following her controversial wartime activities but because the clothes were seen as essentially conservative and offering little new. Bettina Ballard, the influential editor of American Vogue, remained loyal to Chanel, however, and featured Arnaud in the March 1954 issue, photographed by Henry Clarke, wearing three outfits: a red dress with a V-neck, paired with ropes of pearls; a tiered seersucker evening gown; and, to cap it all and in response to both public – and Ballard's – demand, a piece of timeless Chanel – a navy jersey mid-calf suit. Arnaud wore this outfit, "with its slightly padded, square-shouldered cardigan jacket, two patch pockets and sleeves that unbuttoned back to reveal crisp white cuffs", above "a white muslin blouse with a perky collar and bow [that] stayed perfectly in place with small tabs that buttoned onto the waistline of an easy A-line skirt." Ballard had bought the suit herself, which gave "an overwhelming impression of insouciant, youthful elegance", and orders for the clothes that Arnaud had modelled soon started pouring in from the States.

Chanel became very close to les blousons Chanel, none more so than to the "incomparable" Arnaud, who was "almost like her shadow", her "fetish model", her "alter ego ... whom she almost considered her equal", "her muse and dream model" and "her favourite". Chanel said, referring to Arnaud's early work as a cover girl and the shabby way in which she had been treated by magazines:

"I was a good angel to her. I became rather attached to her."

It troubled Chanel that Arnaud had to return to her parents' house in Neuilly after a day's work and that she ate alone at a restaurant, so she offered the model a room in a hotel on rue Cambon, as well as meals with her alone or when she was entertaining friends. Ballard said that Chanel had created her "in her own image", and Arnaud not only constantly pestered Chanel for her old, worn suits, but also mimicked many of Chanel's mannerisms both in everyday life, such as how she held her cigarette and folded her scarf, and on the catwalk and on photoshoots, including the trademark Chanel stance with one foot in front of the other, stomach resolutely vertical and flat, head held imperiously high with chin up, and one hand thrust into a skirt pocket. Nearly forty years later Karl Lagerfeld, who was appointed as artistic director of the fashion house in 1983, would instruct supermodel Linda Evangelista to copy the "legendary" Arnaud's poses when modelling during the 1992 Chanel spring collection at rue Cambon.

Rumours soon arose that Chanel and Arnaud were lovers; according to Sam Spiegel's biographer, Spiegel loved telling people that she was Coco Chanel's girl because being a lesbian made her a virgin in his eyes. Justine Picardie, however, claims that Chanel's relationship with Arnaud – as well as with the American model Suzy Parker – was "a curious mixture of mothering and mentoring, rather than anything truly sexual".

Arnaud announced in 1960 that she no longer wished to work for Chanel, having tired of the life of a model. Chanel was mortified – Haedrich states that "she could not do without Marie-Hélène" – and tried to retain her services by hiring her father as a director of the company on an exorbitant salary, as well as hinting that Arnaud herself would become a director. According to Haedrich, Chanel said: "Marie-Hélène has had it with being a model ... I understand her. But she may be wrong." Haedrich comments: "She had said it all in two sentences: So that kid thinks she can take my place. Wishing doesn't make one Chanel." This contretemps occurred at a time when Chanel was almost 80 and speculation as to who would succeed her was rife, with many people thinking that Chanel had selected Arnaud to take over from her. But Arnaud was reported to have said, contradicting the notion held by Chanel that both she and her father "lusted after" Chanel's throne:

"I loved Coco .... it never crossed my mind that one day I would replace her."

Arnaud did leave, as did her father, who stated "My daughter is capable of doing better things than she is doing." Chanel's break with Arnaud was painful – it was done "for the sake of the house" – and Chanel would later speak unkindly of her.

=== Other houses ===
Although by 1958 Arnaud had become the public face of Chanel, she also worked for other fashion houses, including Balenciaga, Pierre Cardin, André Courrèges, Jean Dessès, Dior and Hermès.

Her closest association was with the recently launched house of Guy Laroche, for whom she appeared on the cover of Life magazine in a gold dress with white polka dots on 1 April 1957. The accompanying text, in which she was described as the "most popular and versatile model in Paris", stated:

A young new model and a young new designer whose clothes she showed have given Paris a sense of double discovery this spring. Twenty-two-year-old Marie-Hélène Arnaud is unlike the breed of Paris mannequins who are usually pale, abnormally thin and wear their clothes with an air of dead-pan hauteur. Marie-Hélène has an outdoor look, is slender but far from skinny (115 pounds, 5' 5 1/2" tall, with 35 inch bust and hips), looks as if she likes the clothes she wears. "People are getting tired of those spooks," said a veteran fashion photographer. "Marie-Hélène is soft, round and looks like a girl."

Laroche's first collection was designed "entirely with Arnaud in mind", and although she was not paid for her work, she could keep the clothes.

== Subsequent work ==
After she left Chanel, Arnaud set herself up as a designer, launching a line of clothes for the department store Grande Maison de Blanc in the Place de l'Opéra, with five seamstresses working from her Paris apartment. The line was not a success and was short-lived. She also considered opening a boutique in Paris and was convinced that Sam Spiegel was going to back her, but she overestimated his wealth; despite being smitten with her, according to Bill Blowitz, "There's no way Sam [was] going to do that for her". She later worked for the French Tourist Agency and in a gallery.

== Acting ==
Like many models of the era, Arnaud branched out into acting in films. She had a number of minor speaking roles, but the biggest film she featured in was her non-speaking role in the musical Gigi, which won a record-breaking nine Oscars in 1958, including Best Picture and Best Costume Design (for Cecil Beaton). Wearing a Beaton-designed evening dress and playing the part of a Maxim's girl, she made a dramatic entrance on the arm of Maurice Chevalier.

== Filmography ==
- Mannequins of Paris (1956) as Josette
- Ça aussi c'est Paris (1957)
- The Twilight Girls (Fr: Les Collégiennes) (1957) as Catherine Royer
- Gigi (1958) as a Maxim's girl
- Fantômas (1964) as Lady Beltham

== Bibliography ==
- Bott, Danièle (2007). Chanel: Collections and Creations. London: Thames & Hudson. ISBN 9780500513606.
- Cassati, Sandro (2009). Coco Chanel pour l'amour des femmes. Paris: City Editions. ISBN 9782824649542.
- Chaney, Lisa (2012). Chanel: An Intimate Life. London: Penguin. ISBN 9780141036854.
- Cosgrave, Bronwyn (2012). Vogue on: Coco Chanel (Vogue on Designers). London: Quadrille. ISBN 9781849491112.
- Deydier, Catherine (30 July 2012). "1954, N° 5 de Chanel". madame.lefigaro.fr.
- Fraser-Cavassoni, Natasha (2003). Sam Spiegel. Simon and Schuster. ISBN 9780684836195.
- Haedrich, Marcel (1972). Coco Chanel: Her Life, Her Secrets. London: Robert Hale. ISBN 0709134770.
- Le Parisien (31 October 2015). "Toussaint : qui sont les célébrités inhumées dans l'Oise".
- Liaut, Jean-Noël (1994). Modèles et mannequins: 1945–1965. Paris: Filipacchi. ISBN 9782850183416.
- Life magazine (1 April 1957). "Double Discovery in Paris: new young designer's new model scores success in three fields". Life. pp. 89–95.
- Orth, Maureen (February 1992). "Kaiser Karl: Behind the Mask". Vanity Fair.
- Picardie, Justine (2013). Coco Chanel: The Legend and the Life. London: HarperCollins. ISBN 9780007319046.
- Wallach, Janet (1999). Chanel: Her Style and Her Life. London: Mitchell Beazley. ISBN 1840002026.
