= Bambasi Refugee Camp =

Coordinates: 9.775°N 34.778°E

Bambasi Refugee Camp is a refugee camp in Ethiopia.

== Background ==
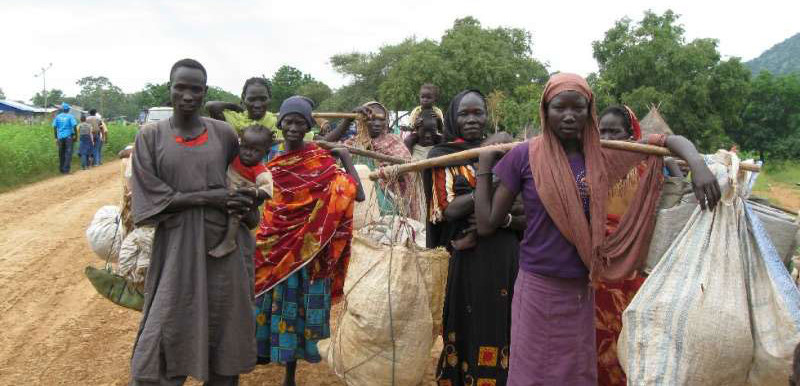
Bambasi Refugees

It was established between 2011 and 2012 to host refugees mainly from the neighboring Sudan and South Sudan. Its establishment is a partnership between the Administration for Refugee & Returnee Affairs (ARRA), International Organisation for Migration (IOM) and the Office of the United Nations High Commission for Refugees (UNHCR)

== Location ==
It is located in Asosa zone which is in the Benishangul-Gumuz region of north-western Ethiopia.

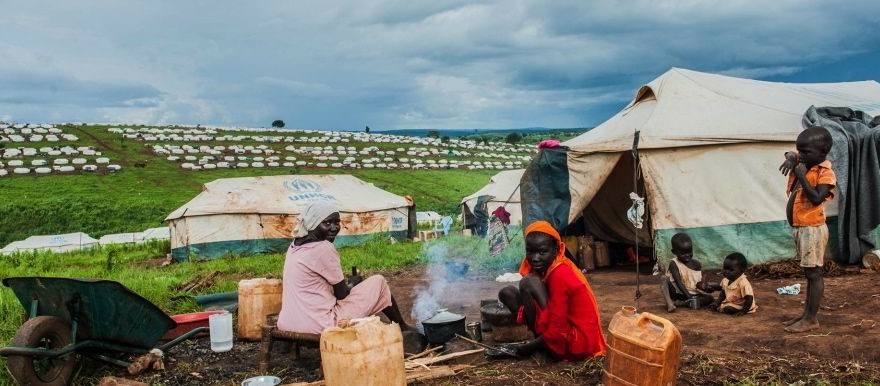
Refugees in Bambasi Refugee Camp

== Demographics and population ==
According to a UNHCR, 31 January 2022 camp profile, Bambasi Refugee Camp was host to 19,337 refugees and asylum seekers.

Earlier on, according to a November 2020 UNHCR camp profile, the population was 18,296, of these 9147 were male and 9149 were female. The top 3 nationalities were 18,217 (99.57%) Sudanese, 34 (0.19%) South Sudanese and 19 (0.1%) D.R Congolese.

== Activities ==
1. Education - There is education program in Bambasi Refugee camp as being one of the activities taking place with fundings from UNICEF Ethiopia.
2. Health - Health concern is a growing demand as health conditions become more reported in Bambasi Refugee Camp.
3. Skills - Provided soft skills work to support refugees in Bambasi to minimize challenge.
