= Julien Martinez Leclerc =

French fashion photographer (born 1995)

Julien Martinez Leclerc (born 1995) is a French fashion photographer and filmmaker based in London.

== Early life and education ==
Leclerc was born in 1995 in Paris, France. Leclerc graduated from the London College of Communication with a Bachelor of Arts in 2017.

== Career ==
Leclerc has contributed to AnOther, Arena Homme +, D la Repubblica, Dazed, Harper's Bazaar, Harper's Bazaar Italia, M Le Magazine du Monde, Mastermind, Pop, System, T, Vogue, Vogue France, Vogue Italia, L'Uomo Vogue, and more. He has worked for Berluti, Bottega Veneta, Chanel, Dior, Helmut Lang, Hermès, Jacquemus, Louis Vuitton, Miu Miu, Moncler, Nina Ricci, Sportmax, Tiffany & Co. and more. He has been awarded a PhotoWorks award and was one of the top 50 in a JW Anderson photography competition.
