= Rahim Fortune =

American photographer

- Born: 1994; Austin
- Occupation: Photographer
- Website: www.rahimfortune.com

Rahim Fortune (born 1994) is an American fine-art / documentary photographer, living and working between Austin, Texas and Brooklyn, New York. He has made two books of work in the Southern United States: Oklahoma (2020) and I Can't Stand to See You Cry (2021).

== Life and work ==
Fortune was born in Austin, Texas and grew up in nearby Kyle, and in Chickasaw Nation, Oklahoma. His mother is Chickasaw and his father is African American. Fortune is a self-taught photographer.

Oklahoma (2020) is a two-volume self-published book made "on trips back to Tupelo, Oklahoma, where he and his sister lived with their mother earlier in their childhood."

I Can't Stand to See You Cry (2021) "touches on the declining health and death of a parent, the COVID-19 pandemic, and the protests and uprising in response to the police murders of Black people around" the United States. Made in Texas and surrounding states, mostly in 2020, the book includes intimate black and white portraits of strangers and his family members, urban landscapes, textures, and abandoned buildings. It was made using a medium format film camera.

Fortune has also photographed Black and Indigenous people living in waterfront communities in America; the Bronner Bros. Hair Show in Atlanta (a twice-yearly show where contestants demonstrate the styling of Black hair"); and has made street style portraits in New York City using an iPhone. He has undertaken commissions for The New York Times.

As of May 2021, he lived in Brooklyn, New York.

== Publications ==
- Oklahoma. Self-published, 2020. OCLC 1261264279.
- I Can't Stand to See You Cry. London: Loose Joints, 2021. ISBN 978-1-912719-25-9.

== Group exhibitions ==
- From the Limitations of Now, Philbrook Museum of Art, Tulsa, Oklahoma, 2021
