= Patricia Schmid =

Swiss fashion model (born 1985)

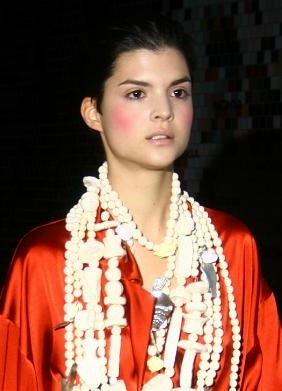
- Born: 23 January 1985 (age 40); Rothrist, Aargau, Switzerland
- Spouse: Gian Tumasch Appenzeller (m. 2015)
- Children: 3
- Modeling information
- Height: 5 ft 9.5 in (1.77 m)
- Hair color: Dark brown
- Eye color: Brown

Patricia Schmid (born 23 January 1985) is a Swiss fashion model. She has appeared on the cover of i-D and French Vogue, and in advertisements for the Japanese cosmetics company Shiseido. She has also walked in shows for Marc Jacobs and Jean Paul Gaultier.

Patricia has also been named one of Models.com top 50 models. She was quoted saying, 'I'm extremely honored to be one of the top 50 models on models.com. It certainly did not harm my career in any way!' in an interview with Pony Ryder.
