= Robert Randall (photographer) =

American photographer

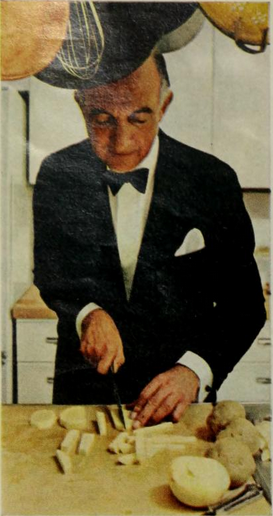
- Randall slicing potatoes in his kitchen
- Born: Robert Shelby Randall Jr. December 17, 1918; Miracle Mile, Los Angeles, California, U.S.
- Died: September 19, 1984 (aged 65); La Jolla, San Diego, California, U.S.
- Occupation: Photographer

Robert Shelby Randall Jr. (December 17, 1918 – September 19, 1984) was an American photographer. He was noted for his fashion photography for the French edition of Vogue magazine in the 1950s, and subsequently for his assignments for American magazines such as Glamour, Seventeen, Look, Good Housekeeping, Harper's Bazaar and Cosmopolitan.

== Early life ==
Randall was born in Miracle Mile, Los Angeles in 1918, the elder son of Robert Shelby Randall (Senior) and Bernadette Fitzgerald. He attended Beverly Hills High School.

== Career ==
After graduating from high school, Randall worked in the photography studios of Metro-Goldwyn-Mayer, and is reported to have appeared as an extra in some of the films of John Ford. (Note: Sources indicate that a Robert Shelby Randall was an extra in John Ford's 1945 navy film They Were Expendable.)

During the Second World War he served as a US Navy photographer, and was trained by Life magazine to take combat pictures. He attained the rank of Photographer's Mate 1st Class Petty Officer.

After the war, he moved to Paris, France, where he secured a job at Condé Nast, publisher of Vogue magazine, with whom he was employed for seven years. In the early 1950s, he became noted for his fashion photography for the French edition of Vogue. His Los Angeles Times obituary would later remark that "photographing his models in the back streets of war-torn Paris, against centuries-old facades, Randall brought a new look to high fashion and created celebrities of the models." After seven years in Paris, he returned to the United States and was based in New York City for 15 years, where he had his own studio on Park Avenue.

In 1968, he moved from New York to Laguna Beach, California, where he worked on a semi-retired basis. In the 1970s, exhibitions of his work were held at the Edward-Dean Museum of Decorative Arts and the Laguna Beach Museum of Art. According to newspaper interviews at the time, he was preparing a book of photographs of Laguna residents; however, it appears this projected work was never published. (Note: The book's proposed title was variously given as Lagona–Laguna or People of Laguna.)

In 1975, he started teaching photography courses through the University of California, Irvine, and at Orange Coast College in Costa Mesa.

In 1977, the Los Angeles Times wrote that "Randall probably took more pictures of celebrities before they became celebrities than just about anybody." His subjects included Brigitte Bardot, Pablo Picasso, Bernard Buffet, Jane Fonda, and Lauren Hutton. He photographed Ali MacGraw and Lynda Day George for Seventeen magazine. His fashion and advertising work also appeared in Glamour, Look, Good Housekeeping, Harper's Bazaar, and Cosmopolitan.

In 1984, Prentice-Hall published his book Fashion Photography: A Guide for the Beginner.

== Death ==
Randall died aged 65 in La Jolla's University Hospital on September 19, 1984, as a result of complications following heart bypass surgery. He had suffered a mild stroke some time earlier. He was survived by a brother, nephew, and cousin. He was interred at San Diego's Fort Rosecrans National Cemetery.

== Bibliography ==
- Randall, Robert (1984). Fashion Photography: A Guide for the Beginner. Englewood Cliffs, NJ: Prentice-Hall. ISBN 978-0133066883.
