= Anne de Zogheb =

Egyptian-born model and art collector (1942–2017)

- Born: Anne Alison de Zogheb; 2 October 1942; Alexandria, Egypt
- Died: 29 March 2017 (aged 74); Hollywood, Los Angeles, U.S.
- Other name: Anne Anka
- Occupations: Model; art collector
- Spouse: Paul Anka (m. 1963; div. 2000)
- Children: 5

Anne Alison de Zogheb (2 October 1942 – 29 March 2017), also known as Anne Anka, was an Egyptian-born model and art collector. She was married to singer Paul Anka from 1963 to 2000.

== Early life ==
Anne Alison de Zogheb was born on 2 October 1942 in Alexandria, Egypt to Lebanese diplomat Charles de Zogheb and an English mother. She had a twin sister and was of English, Lebanese, French, Dutch, and Greek descent. Her grandfather was educated in France and was knighted by the King of Italy. The Zoghebs were a wealthy Syro-Lebanese Catholic family originally from Damascus who had been resident in Alexandria since the 19th-century.

Anne's family fled to England as a result of the Egyptian revolution of 1952, where she was placed in a convent school and then a finishing school. She dropped out of the latter and subsequently moved to Paris.

== Career ==
Upon moving to Paris, Zogheb began working at a small fashion house. Encouraged by her then-boyfriend, she visited the offices of Dorian Leigh and, within a few weeks, booked her first modeling job. Her modeling career took off when she was scouted by Paris Match. She later moved to New York City in 1959 after being taken under the wing of Eileen Ford.

While living in New York, Zogheb featured on the covers of Vogue, Vogue France, Harper's Bazaar, and ELLE France. In 1968, an article in Glamour described Zogheb as a supermodel.

Zogheb began collecting art during this time, her collection eventually expanding to include pieces by Sol LeWitt, Robert Rauschenberg, Mark di Suvero, Pamela Rosenkranz, Christopher Wool, Joel Shapiro, Glenn Ligon, Josh Smith, Kelley Walker, Cy Twombly, Lynda Benglis, Rudolf Stingel, Gerhard Richter, Kris Martin, Alex Israel, Garth Weiser, Walead Beshty, Edward Ruscha, and Albert Oehlen. She additionally modeled for paintings for Elliott Hundley.

Zogheb retired from modeling after giving birth to her second child.

== Personal life ==
Zogheb met Canadian singer Paul Anka while on assignment with the Eileen Ford Agency in San Juan, Puerto Rico in 1962. The couple married at the Orly Airport in Paris on 16 February 1963. They resided in New York City and Carmel, California, and had five daughters: Alexandra, Amelia, Amanda, Alicia, and Anthea. The couple divorced amicably on 2 October 2000, after 37 years of marriage.
