= Max Vadukul =

British photographer (born 1961)

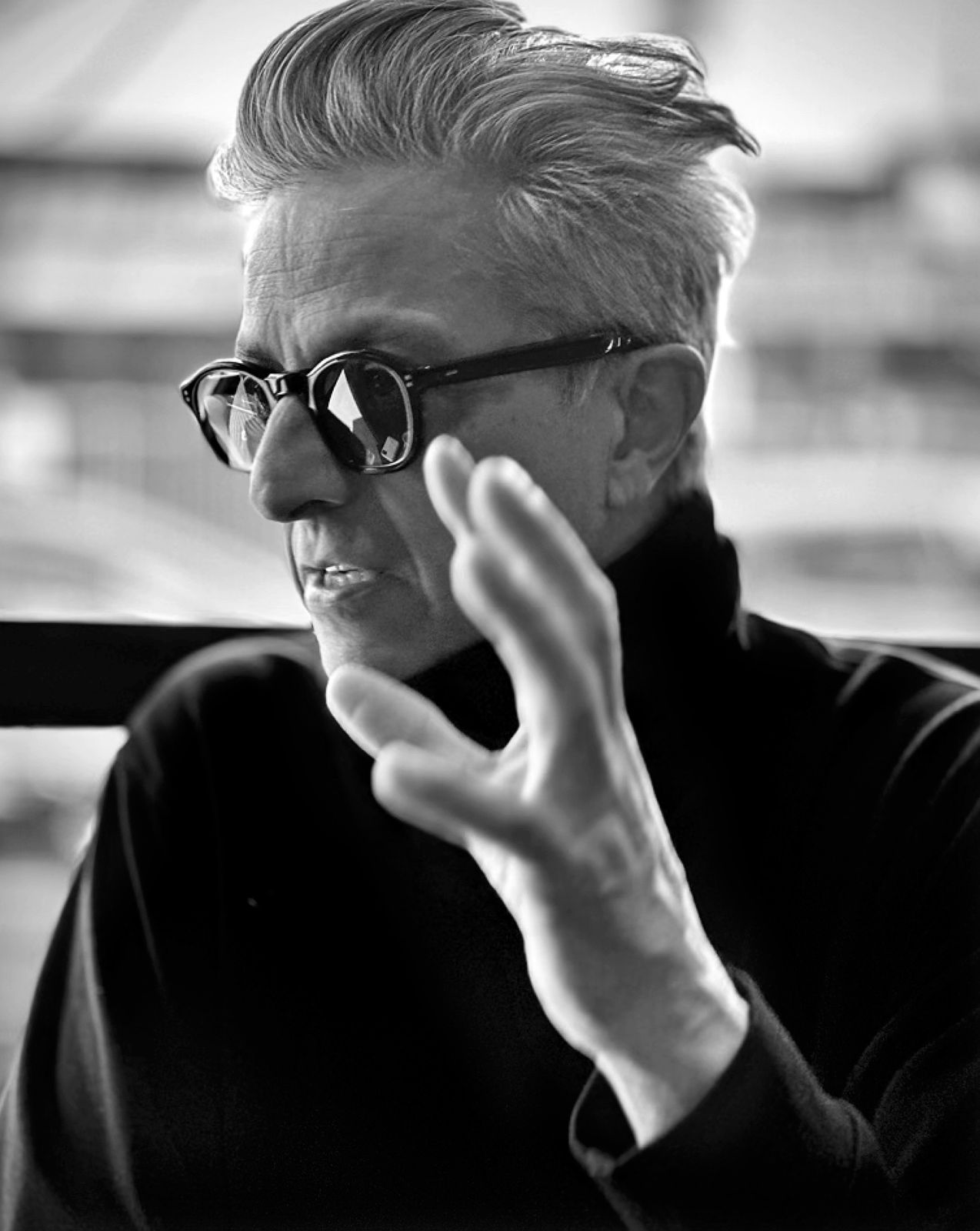
- Max Vadukul Through Her Eyes
- Born: February 2, 1961 (age 65); Nairobi, Kenya
- Known for: Photography
- Website: maxvadukul.com

Max Vadukul (born Mradukant Shantilal Vadukul on 2 February 1961), is a British-Indian photographer based in Milan, Italy. Noted for his black-and-white imagery, Vadukul expressed his preference for monochrome photography as superior, stating, “Black-and-white is king. King of kings. Color is Commercial”, in an interview with J’aipur journal. He holds the distinction of being the first photographer of Indian origin to publish in the editions of Paris, Italian, British, and American Vogue, photographing celebrated figures such as Amy Winehouse, Tilda Swinton, Beyonce, Paul McCartney, Natalie Portman, Tom Hanks, Justin Timberlake, and many more. Sting has described his photography as a sort of "On the move style". The National Geographic channel produced a feature documentary on Vadukul in 2000 about the improbable arc of his life after Africa; the documentary continues to air around South Asia today.

== Early life ==
Vadukul was born 1961 to an Indian family in Nairobi, Kenya. His family moved to Northern London when he was a teenager. He did not complete high school, but developed an interest in photography after his father took a job at the Carl Zeiss lens company. At the age of 16, he ran away from home to escape an arranged marriage.

== Career ==
Max Vadukul has long standing relationships with The New Yorker, French Vogue, Italian Vogue, L'Uomo Vogue, W Magazine, Interview, and Rolling Stone. He shoots regularly for T: The New York Times Style Magazine, Esquire, Vogue China, Egoiste, Town & Country, and others. His book, "MAX," published in 2000 by Nicholas Callaway, came out the same year as Helmut Newton's "Sumo," helping start the trend of oversized large-format photography books.

Vadukul's first success came when Lord David Puttnam asked him to take photographs of his producers.

In the 1980s and 90s he introduced a distinct blend of high-octane energy and offbeat spontaneity, through predominantly black-and-white images, into the traditionally commercial form of fashion photography. In the 1990s, as the second staff photographer in The New Yorker Magazine's history (following Richard Avedon), he emerged as one of the world's foremost portrait photographers, capturing hundreds of subjects ranging from Mother Teresa and Salman Rushdie to Mick Jagger and Mikail Baryshnikov. He describes his style as “art reportage,” which he calls the “taking of reality and turning into art.”

Vadukul was discovered in 1984 by the Japanese designer Yohji Yamamoto, who assigned the then 22-year-old Vadukul one of his prestigious ad campaigns. It was the first of several Yamamoto campaigns for Vadukul and introduced the photography world to his dynamic movement-filled black-and-white images. Vadukul established his editorial career in the 1990s with a large body of work for French Vogue and Italian Vogue – much of which was produced with his wife, the eminent fashion editor Nicoletta Santoro, with whom he has collaborated regularly over the years. Recently, he shot two of W Magazine's annual "Art" issue covers - an overseas collaboration with the Chinese dissident artist, Ai Weiwei, and a collaboration with the artist George Condo and actress Jessica Chastain. In 1996 the producers of the Broadway musical "Chicago" asked Vadukul to create the new show's image; the dark, stylized black-and-white portraits he took remain the basis for the show's current campaigns.

From 1996 to 2000 he held the post of The New Yorker’s staff photographer, shooting an average of 52 assignments a year. Other subjects included Al Gore, James Brown, Donald Trump, Natalie Portman, Tom Hanks, Roger Federer, Tilda Swinton, David Geffen, and a group portrait of 40 Nobel laureates. In 1997 he photographed almost the entirety of the magazine's celebrated Indian Fiction issue. After his tenure at The New Yorker he followed its editor, Tina Brown, to become Photo Editor-At-Large of her Talk Magazine.

Vadukul has a long history with music photography. As a lead photographer for Rolling Stone Magazine he took portraits of Amy Winehouse, Mick Jagger and Keith Richards, Bruce Springsteen, Lil Wayne, Kanye West, Justin Timberlake and Christina Aguilera, the Beastie Boys, Florence Welch, and Metallica. He has also photographed several albums including the Rolling Stone's "Bridges to Babylon," Beyonce's "B'Day," and Paul McCartney's "Memory Almost Full." His black-and-white style was utilized most directly, however, by Sting, who asked Vadukul to take the photos for his "Dream of the Blue Turtles" solo album, which was the artist's first after the Police.

Vadukul has also photographed campaigns for Chloé, Comme des Garçons, Longchamp, Armani, Emanuel Ungaro, Sandro, and HBO's "Six Feet Under." Last year, he photographed the campaign for the Broadway revival of Hedwig and the Angry Inch, featuring Neil Patrick Harris.

== Personal life ==
Max Vadkul currently resides in Milan, Italy with his wife Nicoletta Santoro, former fashion director/creative director of Vogue Italia, with whom he has two children, Alex and Eloise.

== Exhibitions ==
Max had his first US solo gallery show in 2011 at 212 Gallery in Aspen, Colorado titled, "Kinetic Force". In 2011 Max was featured in the group exhibition "Beyond Words: Photography in The New Yorker at the Howard Greenberg Gallery in New York, NY. He had a group show at The Wapping Project Bankside for "Yohji's Women" in London, England in 2011. Other group exhibitions include: "Who Shot Rock & Roll: A Photographic History 1955 to the Present" at the Brooklyn Museum of Art in New York & "Five Decades of Passion, We are the World: Figures & Portraits" at the Fisher Landau Center of Art, Long Island City, NY in 2009.

In November 2022, Dubai’s Culture and Arts Authority hosted, “Timeless Exhibition”, where Max chose Ludmilla Voronkina as his protagonist and displayed 30 large-format images dedicated to women. Parallel to his Dubai showcase he had another exhibition on display focussing on Climate Change, in Milan, Italy,“MAX VADUKUL, THE WITNESS”, presented by the Sozzani Foundation, displayed from 18 September 2022 to 8 January 2023. Following THE WITNESS, in 2023, Max showcased, “Through her eyes. Timeless Strength”, curated by Claudio Dell’Olio which he described as a testament to the beauty and strength of women. The exhibition was held in Gallerie d’Italia, Milan, Italy.

== Books ==
- Max: Photographs by Max Vadukul. New York: Callaway Publications, 2000.
- Crazy Horse. New York: Piccolo Press, 2001.
