= Dominique Issermann =

French photographer

Dominique Issermann (born 11 April 1947) is a French photographer. She works primarily with black and white photography, and is noted for her works in portraits, fashion and advertising.

She has shot campaigns for Sonia Rykiel, Christian Dior, Nina Ricci, Guess, Lancôme, La Perla, Tiffany, Chanel and many others. Her work has also been featured in the fashion supplements for The New York Times, Corriere Della Sera and Le Monde.

Issermann photographed Leonard Cohen over several decades. The two had a long relationship, and Cohen dedicated his album I'm Your Man to her. Issermann is half-Jewish.
