= Carlijn Jacobs =

Dutch fashion photographer (born 1991)

- Born: 1991 (age 34–35); Netherlands
- Education: Amsterdam University of Applied Sciences; Willem de Kooning Academy (BFA)
- Occupation: Photographer
- Website: carlijnjacobs.com

Carlijn Jacobs (born 1991) is a Dutch fashion photographer.

== Early life and education ==
Carlijn Jacobs was born in 1991 in the Netherlands. She studied at Willem de Kooning Academy, where her work was recognised for its commentary on "mass culture".

== Work ==
She began photography by shooting images of “flowers and things like that” before working with a friend who made dresses on photoshoots together.

In 2022 she worked with American singer Beyoncé and photographed her for the Renaissance album art and cover. T included the album cover on its list of 25 Photos that have defined the modern age.

She regularly shoots for editions of Vogue, and has photographed advertising campaigns for Acne Studios, Carven, Chanel and Prada among others. She has also worked multiple times with Alex Consani, Bella Hadid and Angelina Kendall.

== Exhibitions ==
- 2023 – Sleeping Beauty, Foam Fotografiemuseum, Amsterdam
- 2026 – Autoportrait: Carlijn Jacobs, Acne Paper Palais Royal, Paris

== Publications ==
- Mannequins. Art Paper Editions. 2021. ISBN 9789493146631. (co-authored by James Chester)
- Eyes. Note Note Éditions. March 2023. ISBN 9782493467034. (co-authored by Sophie Pinet)
- Sleeping Beauty. Note Note Éditions. 5 October 2023. ISBN 9782493467058.
- Making Faces. 7 May 2026. (edited by Christopher Simmonds)
