= Carin Backoff =

American photographer

Carin Backoff is an American photographer and director.

== Background ==
Backoff was born in California, United States and attended Orange Coast College, she is currently based in New York City. Backoff studied film at university before developing an interest in photography. During Alastair McKimm's tenure (2025) as Fashion & Image Director at Vogue France, Backoff frequently contributed to the publication. Backoff was previously a frequent contributor to Love where she photographed Bella Hadid, Emily Ratajkowski, Gigi Hadid, Kendall Jenner, Nicole Kidman, and Selena Gomez among others.

She has contributed to Interview, Vogue Australia, Vogue China, Vogue Japan, worked with Agent Provocateur, Blumarine, Fenty Beauty, Marc Jacobs, Michael Kors, Miu Miu, Sephora, Skims, Victoria's Secret, and many more.
