= Angelina Kendall =

Brazilian-New Zealand model

- Kendall on the cover of M Le Magazine du Monde, November 2023
- Born: 3 September 2005 (age 21); Sydney, Australia
- Occupation: Model
- Years active: 2021–present
- Modelling information
- Height: 5 ft 9.5 in (1.77 m)
- Hair color: Light brown
- Eye colour: Green
- Agencies: Ford Models (Paris); The Industry (New York City); The Scouted (Sydney, mother agency); #specialbeauties (Milan)

Angelina Kendall (born 3 September 2005) is a Brazilian-New Zealand model. British Vogue has stated that supermodel status "beckons" for her. She has also been referred to as "Baby Gisele" for her likeness to Brazilian übermodel Gisele Bündchen.

== Early life ==
Kendall was born in September 2005 in Sydney, Australia. Her mother is Brazilian and her father is a New Zealander, though they are now separated. She grew up living between Narrabeen, Rio de Janeiro and Wagga Wagga.

== Career ==
Kendall was scouted in August 2021 through social media by Simone Hellicar at The Scouted, a Sydney-based modeling agency. She moved to Europe in February 2023. Before becoming a model, she had planned to become a doctor.

She made her catwalk debut in February 2023 for Khaite. During that fashion season (Autumn/Winter 2023), she walked in 17 shows, and in the following season (Spring/Summer 2024), she walked in 27 shows. The shows she participated in included Chanel, Dior, Valentino, Schiaparelli and Hermès. Since then, she has appeared in ad campaigns for Burberry, Fendi, H&M, Loro Piana, Louis Vuitton, Tom Ford, Versace, Zara and more. Her first photoshoot outside of Australia was for Burberry's first swimwear ad campaign, shot in Antigua.

Also in February 2023, she was featured on the cover of Order Magazine, her first magazine cover. She was later featured on the covers of Holiday and Harper's Bazaar France before making her debut on the cover of Vogue. Her first Vogue cover was the September 2023 issue of Vogue Italia, and since then, she has appeared on the covers of Vogue Australia, Vogue España, Vogue México, Vogue Latinoamérica, British Vogue and on a digital cover for American Vogue. In June 2024, Kendall was the closing bride for the final Chanel collection designed by Virginie Viard in June 2024. She also appeared on the cover of French Harper's Bazaar for the second time (the June/July 2024 issue) alongside Devyn Garcia, Ella McCutcheon and Awar Odhiang.

Kendall made her Victoria's Secret Fashion Show debut on the Victoria's Secret Fashion Show 2025 runway. She has also appeared on the Vogue World runway for Vogue World London (2023), Vogue World Hollywood (2025), and in editorials for Vogue World Hollywood and Vogue World Milano (2026).

== Personal life ==
Kendall's native language is English, but she is also fluent in Portuguese.
