= Michael Reinhardt =

American photographer (born 1938)

- Born: Michael Max Reinhardt; February 20, 1938 (age 88); Los Angeles, California
- Other name: Mike Reinhardt
- Occupation: Photographer
- Known for: Fashion photography, Reportage
- Spouse: Tammi Reinhardt (m. 1991-Present)
- Children: Sandro, Sarah, Max
- Parent(s): Wolfgang Reinhardt, Lally Reinhardt
- Relatives: Max Reinhardt, Helene Thimig
- Website: michaelreinhardtphoto.com

Michael Reinhardt (born Michael Max Reinhardt aka Mike Reinhardt) is an American photographer whose images were featured in magazines such as Vogue, Harper's Bazaar and Sports Illustrated. His work also includes a wide range of photo reportage some of which are published in the book My Road Home, May 28, 2014.

== Frühes Leben ==Michael Reinhardt wurde am 20. Februar 1938 in Los Angeles, Kalifornien, geboren. Er ist der Enkel des Theater- und Filmregisseurs Max Reinhardt. Sein Vater Wolfgang Reinhardt Kriegserfolge Filmproduzent und Drehbuchautor. Seine Mutter Lally Krieg Künstlerin. Seine Großmutter, die Schauspielerin [Else Heims]] Michael ist das älteste von drei Kindern. Ihr Zuhause-Krieg in Santa Monica, Kalifornien, wo er die Santa Monica High School besuchte.

== Munich and Paris 1953–1970 ==
In 1953 he moved with his family to Munich, Germany, where he graduated from the Luitpold Gymnasium in 1959 obtaining the German Abitur (International Baccalaureate). He went on to attend law school Aix-Marseille University in Aix-en-Provence, France, and received his French law degree in 1964. The following year, he moved to Paris, where he joined a French law firm while working on his doctorate. In 1967 he was hired to help run the French model agency, Dorian Leigh. It was during this time that he became fascinated with taking pictures and grew to be close friends with photographer Louis Faurer who had seen some of his early images and encouraged him to take up photography professionally. Faurer and, to some extent Robert Frank with whom he also became acquainted at the time, later became his mentors. Subsequently, known as Mike Reinhardt, his career as a fashion photographer began in Paris, France, where his reputation steadily grew and he worked for such publications as 20 Ans, Elle, Marie Claire, Jardin des Modes, and Vogue Paris.

== New York 1970–2003 ==
In 1970 he returned to the United States and decided to establish himself in New York City, where he moved into an artist's Studio in Carnegie Hall. At that time a number of fashion photographers from Paris also sought to settle in New York, and in the fashion business they were known collectively as '"The French Connection". Reinhardt remained in New York for over thirty years where he shot for amongst many others, Vogue, British Vogue, German Vogue, Harpers Bazaar, Bazaar Italia, The New York Times, Life, Esquire, Sports Illustrated, Revlon, Max Factor, Estée Lauder Companies, L'Oréal, Calvin Klein and Bloomingdale's.

== Published works ==
- Michael Reinhardt, My Road Home, Till Schaap Edition (May 28, 2014)

== Exhibitions ==
=== Solo shows ===
- "East End Memories" August 28, 2009 Gallery B, Sag Harbor, New York
- "American Graffiti" August 31, 2010 Gallery B, Sag Harbor, New York:

=== Other exhibitions ===
- "MusiCares" May 24, 2009, Club Nokia, Los Angeles
- "Jammin’ and Wailin" February 6–20, 2010, Mr. Musichead, Los Angeles
- "The Model as Muse" The Costume Institute of the Metropolitan Museum of Art New York: May 6 – August 9, 2009
