= Willy Rizzo =

Italian photographer and designer

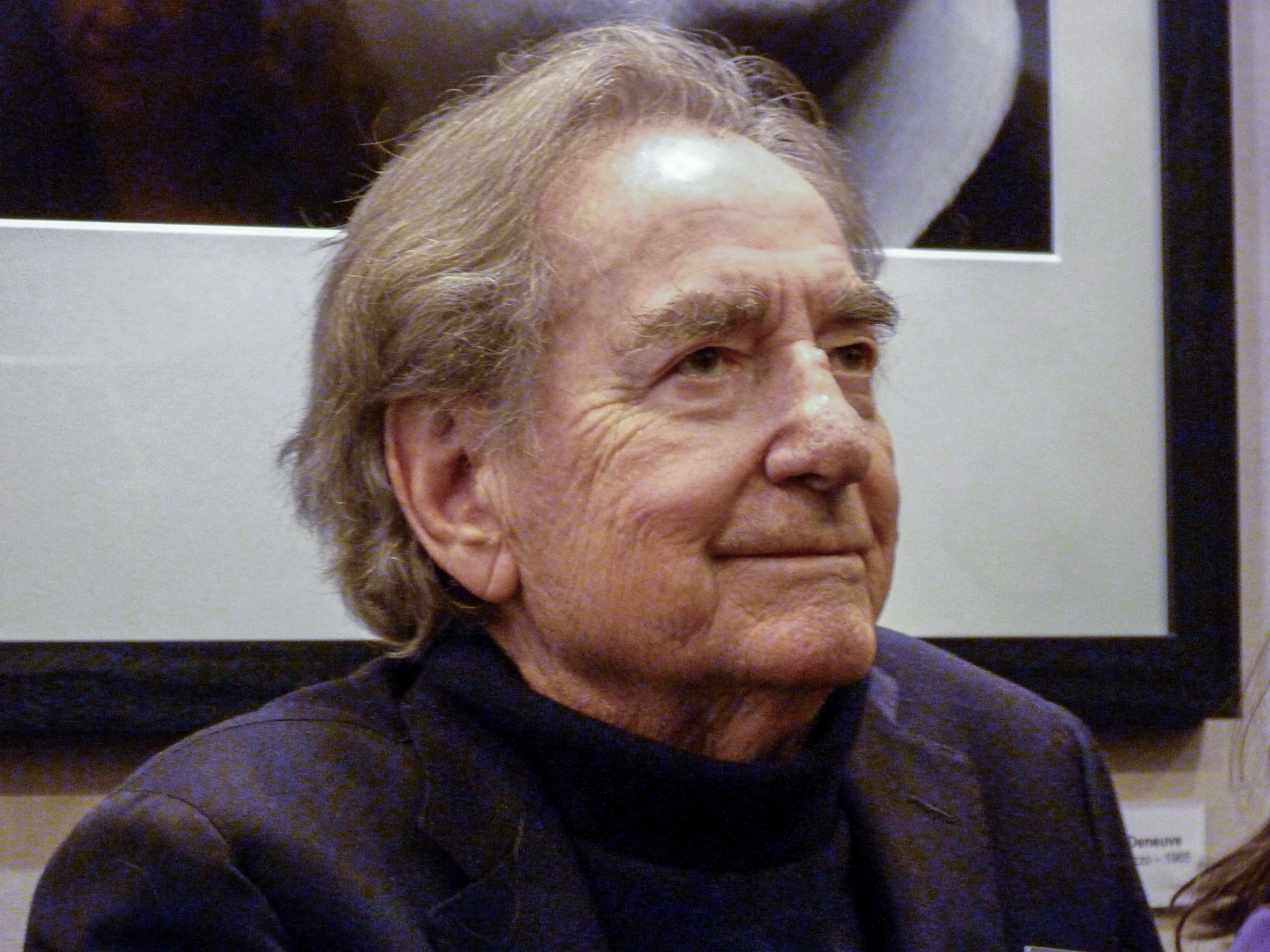
- Rizzo in 2010
- Born: 22 October 1928; Naples, Kingdom of Italy
- Died: 25 February 2013 (aged 84); Paris, France
- Occupations: Photographer, furniture designer
- Years active: 1940s–2013
- Spouses: Elsa Martinelli (m. 1968–1978); Dominique Rizzo (m. 1979)

Willy Rizzo (22 October 1928 – 25 February 2013) was an Italian photographer and designer.

Rizzo began his career as a photographer in Paris in the early 1940s. He initially worked as a photo reporter for various agencies and magazines. Later, he mainly photographed fashion spreads and celebrities.

Over the course of his career, Rizzo took portraits of numerous well-known personalities, including Marilyn Monroe, Pablo Picasso, Salvador Dalí, Brigitte Bardot, Marlene Dietrich, Coco Chanel and Jack Nicholson. He later also became friends with the actor.

== Publications ==
- Starsociety, editor Schirmer Mosel, 1994
- Mes stars : L'Album secret de Willy Rizzo, text of Jean-Pierre de Lucovich, editor Filipacchi, 2003 (ISBN 978-2850187728)
- Willy Rizzo, Contrejour, 2014
- Chanel by Willy Rizzo, texts of Fabrice Gaignault, Edmonde Charles-Roux, Olivier Saillard, Arnold de Contades et Danniel Rangel, editor Minerve, 2015
