= Satoshi Saïkusa =

Japanese photographer (1959–2021)

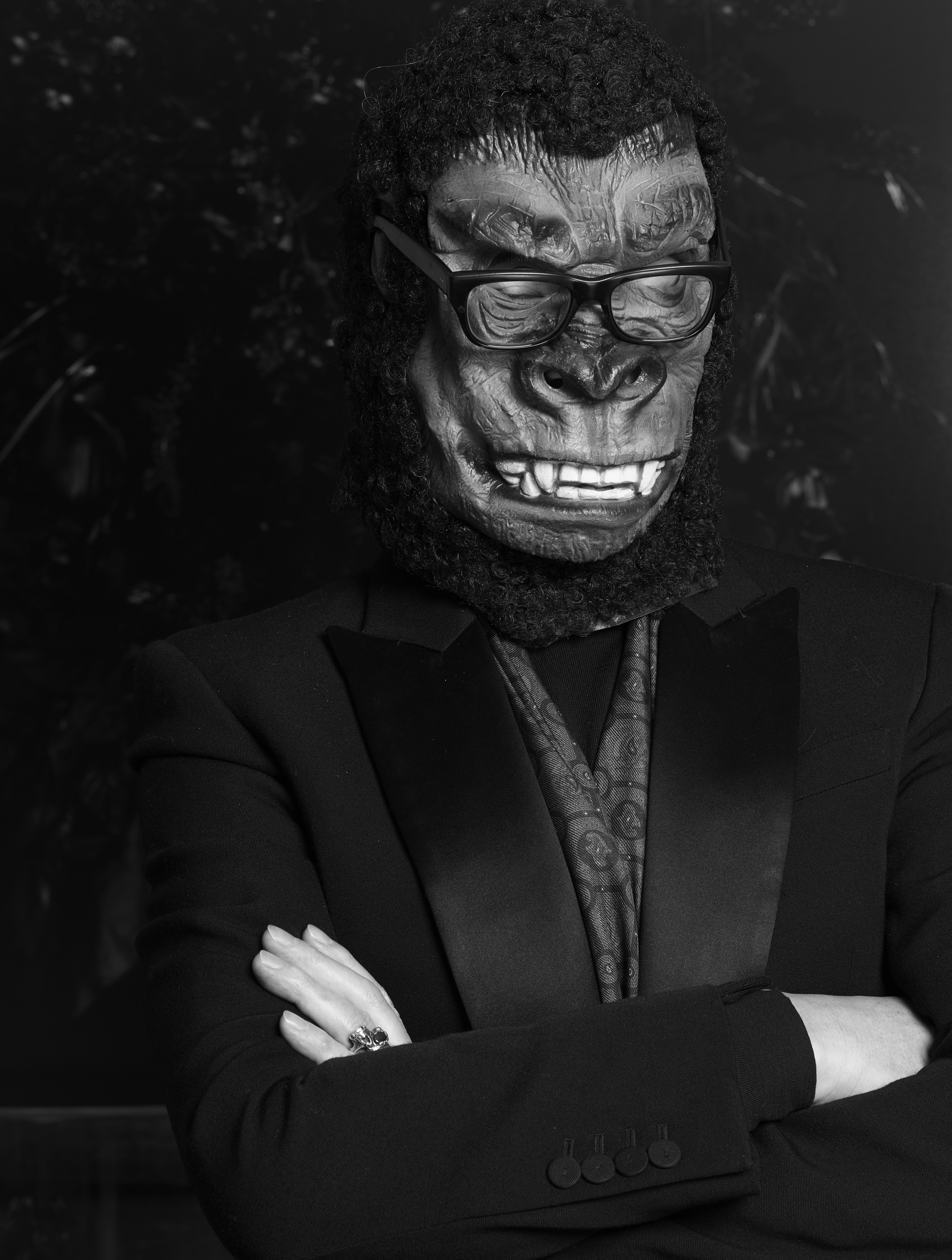
Self-portrait by Saïkusa (2012)

Satoshi Saïkusa (1959 – 2021) was a Japanese photographer who primarily produced fashion photography.

Saïkusa was born in 1959 on the island of Kyushu. In the mid-1980s he began his career as a photographer in Paris, working with top brands, magazines, and models. Saïkusa contributed to Elle, Grazia, GQ Style Italia, Harper's Bazaar UK, L'Officiel, L'Officiel Hommes, Madame Figaro, Marie Claire USA, Numéro, Numéro Tokyo, Vogue Deutsch, Vogue España, Vogue Italia,Vogue Paris,, W, and shot campaigns for Ashi Studio, Givenchy, Jill Stuart, Trussardi, Yohji Yamamoto, and more.

== Exhibitions ==
- No-Zarashi, Galerie Da-End, Paris (21 September – 11 November, 2017)
- White Devils, Galerie 2Art Angels, Paris (21 September – 11 November, 2017)
