= Anthony Seklaoui =

French photographer (born 1987)

Anthony Seklaoui (born 18 September 1987), is a French fashion photographer and filmmaker of Australian and Lebanese origin. Seklaoui has worked closely with the house of Alaïa and its artistic director Pieter Mulier.

== Early life ==
Seklaoui was born on 18 September 1987 in Cagnes-sur-Mer to an Australian mother and Lebanese father.

== Education and career ==
Seklaoui was studying computer science before developing a passion for film and studying at the École Supérieure de Réalisation Audiovisuelle. At age twenty-seven he switched to photography and became an intern for his friend Maeva.

Sekaloui has worked for Alaïa, Chanel, D La Repubblica, Dazed, H&M, Harper's Bazaar, Harper's Bazaar France, Holiday, i-D, Gucci, Jacquemus, JW Anderson, M Le Magazine du Monde, Saint Laurent, Salvatore Ferragamo, Sandro Paris, T, Tom Ford, Vogue, Vogue España, Vogue France, Vogue Italia, Zara, and others.

== Bibliography ==
- Alaïa by Seklaoui (Mörel Books, 2025)

== Filmography ==
- Callipolis
