= Henry Clarke (photographer) =

American fashion photographer

Henry Clarke (c. 1917 – April 26, 1996) was an American fashion photographer, known particularly for his work for Vogue.

Clarke was born in Los Angeles in about 1917. He worked in the 1940s as a window dresser for I. Magnin, luxury department store in San Francisco before becoming a background and accessorising assistant at the Vogue New York studio, where he learned to photograph by observing the different styles of Cecil Beaton, Irving Penn and Horst P. Horst. He died on April 26, 1996, at the Anglo-American Hospital in Le Cannet, France, at the age of 77.
