= Mert and Marcus =

Fashion photography duo (active 1994– )

Mert Alaş
- Born: February 26, 1971 (age 55); Turkey
- Occupations: Fashion photographer; music video director
- Years active: 1994–present
- Website: mertandmarcus.com (defunct)

Marcus Piggott
- Born: 1971 (age 54–55); Wales
- Occupations: Fashion photographer; music video director
- Years active: 1994–present
- Website: mertandmarcus.com (defunct)

Mert and Marcus is the working name of two fashion photographers, Mert Alaş (born 1971) and Marcus Piggott (born 1971), who work together on a collaborative basis.

== Career ==
Mert Alaş, born in Turkey, and Marcus Piggott, born in Wales, met in England in 1994 after having worked for a brief period in different areas; Alaş worked in classical music and Piggott worked in graphic design. Piggott was an assistant photographer and Alaş was a fashion photo modeler. After working together in the photography business, they decided to create a team. When they showed their first photos to Dazed and Confused, the London fashion magazine, they immediately made the cover.

The team has worked for such magazines as Vogue, Vogue Paris, Vogue Italia, Interview, Love, W, Pop Magazine, Numéro and Arena Homme +. Some of their major clients have included fashion labels such as Dior, Louis Vuitton, Missoni, Giorgio Armani, Roberto Cavalli, Fendi, Kenzo and Miu Miu. They have created the images for perfume houses such as Gucci, Yves St Laurent, Givenchy and Lancôme.

Alaş and Piggott have also worked with celebrities including Madonna, Marion Cotillard, Cara Delevingne, Adele, Adriana Lima, Lady Gaga, Julia Roberts, Rihanna, Shakira, Jennifer Lopez, Ariana Grande, Linda Evangelista, Gisele Bündchen, Björk, Gigi Hadid, Kendall Jenner, Lindsay Lohan, Scarlett Johansson, Charlotte Rampling, Bella Hadid, Kylie Minogue, Sophie Ellis-Bextor, Victoria Beckham, and have shot album covers for Fergie, Taylor Swift (Reputation and The Life of a Showgirl) and Nicki Minaj.

They created the cover art for Rob Dougan's 2002 CD Furious Angels.

In 2015, Mert and Marcus were awarded Honorary Fellowship of the Royal Photographic Society.

In 2018, Mert and Marcus won the Isabella Blow Award for Fashion Creator.

Album covers photographed

- Sophie Ellis-Bextor – Read My Lips (2001)
- Rob Dougan - Furious Angels (2002)
- Kylie Minogue – Body Language (2003)
- Jennifer Lopez – Rebirth (2005)
- Shakira – She Wolf (2009)
- Madonna – MDNA (2012)
- Madonna – Rebel Heart (2015)
- Fergie - Double Dutchess (2017)
- Shania Twain - Now (2017)
- Taylor Swift – Reputation (2017)
- Nicki Minaj – Queen (2018)
- Cher – Forever (2024)
- Taylor Swift – The Life of a Showgirl (2025)
