= Jeanloup Sieff =

French photographer

Jeanloup Sieff (November 30, 1933 – September 20, 2000) was a French photographer. He was born in Paris to Polish parents. He was a photography student of Gertrude Fehr. He is famous for his portraits of politicians, famous artists, landscapes, as well as for his nudes and use of wide-angle lens and visible dodging marks. He worked mainly in black and white and in fashion.

He died in Paris. His daughter, Sonia Sieff, is also a photographer.

== Works ==
- Femme assise sur une chaise, 1972, 40 x 30 cm, Musée d'art de Toulon
