= Steve Hiett =

British photographer, musician, artist, and graphic designer (1940–2019)

- Born: December 26, 1940; Oxford, England
- Died: August 28, 2019 (aged 78); South of France
- Occupation: Photographer · Graphic Designer · Musician · Artist
- Years active: 50+
- Spouse: Louise Despointes

Steve Hiett (26 December 1940 – 28 August 2019) was a British photographer, musician, artist and graphic designer based in Paris.

== Early life and education ==
Hiett was born on 26 December 1940 in Oxford. Later, his parents moved him and his sister from the East End of London to Lancing, West Sussex where they grew up. From 1957 Hiett studied painting at Worthing Art School. In 1959 he changed to Brighton Art School to study graphic design, he also began studying photography.

== Life and work ==
After studying he joined a psych/pop band, Pyramid. This experience led to him photographing Jimi Hendrix backstage in the 1970s. In addition Hiett began a series of photos of empty suburban streets that resulted in his first book, Pleasure Places (Flash Books, 1975).

In 1968 he began his career as a fashion photographer for Nova magazine. In 1972 he moved to Paris and his work began to be published regularly in Marie Claire, Vogue, and Elle. During the 1980s he worked as a photographer and developed his signature style of over-saturated images, off-centre framing and dazzling flash. In the same period he made a guitar solo album in Japan for Sony/CBS: Down on the Road by the Beach accompanied by a photo book. In the 1990s Hiett moved to New York City and did graphic design and typography. There he met Carla Sozzani, who invited him to return to Paris and work for Vogue Italia. Hiett photographed celebrities. He worked for the fashion magazines Marie Claire, Vogue Italia, The Face, Vogue France, Vogue China, Vogue Russia, Vogue Spain, Harper's Bazaar, Visionnaire, Hunger, Nova, Elle, Spoon Magazine and Glamour. He worked for the brands Roberto Cavalli, Guy Laroche, Oscar de la Renta, Big, and Piaget.

In 2014 he led the judging of the photography category at the Hyeres Festival, during which a retrospective entitled Steve Hiett: The Song Remains the Same was held at Villa Noailles.

== Personal life ==
Hiett had a daughter and two grandchildren. In 2018, he married former fashion model and modelling agent Louise Despointes. He died aged 78 on 28 August 2019.

== Exhibitions ==
- Down on the Road by the Beach, Galerie Watari, Tokyo, May 1983
- Vogue's Glittering World, Galleria Carla Sozzani, Milan, 1999
- La Femme Cachée – London, Berlin, Milan, Shangai, C/O Berlin, Berlin, 2003
- Electric Fashion, Wouter van Leeuwen, Amsterdam, 2007
- Visiontrack, Galerie Maeght, Paris, 2009
- Out Takes, Somerset House, London, 2012
- The Song Remains the Same, Villa Noailles, Hyères, Hyères 2014 Festival international de mode et de photographie, 2014
- Urban Grace, 7.24×0.26 Gallery, Milan, Italy, 2014
- She Knows Me Too Well: Some Early Photographs, Galerie Madé, Paris, 2014/15
- Beyond Blonde, Galleria Carla Sozzani, Milan, Italy, 2016
- Cool Pola, Galerie La Hune, Paris, 2016/17
- Steve Hiett Polaroids, Galerie Madé, Paris, 2017

== Publications ==
- Pleasure Places. Flash, 1975. ISBN 0825639042.
- Down on the Road by the Beach. Sony/CBS, 1982.
- Hyper Real Soul. gallery 213, 2000.
- Femme Cachée. Joop Jeans; Milan: Vogue Italia, 2005.
- Glittering World. Condé Nast Italy, 2006.
- Portraits de Ville: New York. Paris: be-pôles, 2012. ISBN 9782917004111.
- Roland Garros. Paris: Martiniere, 2015. ISBN 978-2732467917. With a preface by Philippe Labro.
- Beyond Blonde. Munich: Prestel, 2015. Philippe Garner. ISBN 978-3791381800. "Traces the evolution of his first shots, taken in Bromley of "simple pictures of quiet empty places" to his time as art director at Arthur Elgort's Model Manual and his ongoing work in fashion today."
