= Awar Odhiang =

Canadian-South Sudanese model (born 2000)

- Born: 2000 (age 25–26); Pugnido Refugee Camp, Ethiopia
- Occupation: Model
- Modelling information
- Height: 5 ft 10 in (1.78 m)
- Hair colour: Black
- Eye colour: Brown
- Agencies: Mode Models International (Calgary, mother agency); Traffic Models (Barcelona); Models 1 (London); Fabbrica Milano (Milan); Ford Models (New York, Paris)

Awar Odhiang (born 2000) is a Canadian-South Sudanese model. Odhiang is known for enthusiastically closing the Spring/Summer 2026 collection of Chanel. Vogue Italia deemed her as "the topmodel of the moment" in February 2026.

== Early life ==
Odhiang was born in 2000 in a refugee camp in Ethiopia's Pugnido (Pinyudo) Refugee Camp. Her parents are Anyuak and fled South Sudan due to civil war prior to Odhiang's birth. In 2002, her family was sponsored by a church and settled in Moose Jaw, Canada. At 16 she moved to Calgary with her family.

Growing up Odhiang was bullied, saying "I was the odd one out in my class and society in general. Growing up in Moose Jaw, there weren't very many Black families there or Black people in general. I really felt like an outcast. I didn't really see myself as beautiful, I guess."

== Career ==
Odhiang was scouted at 16 by Canadian model-turned agent Lisa Kauffmann. A year later when working working at an Old Navy in Market Mall, Kelly Streit scouted Odhiang and with the blessing of Kauffmann (who intended to close her agency) signed to Mode Models International. Before becoming a model Odhiang intended to become a doctor.

Odhiang worked for SSENSE before signing to an Italian modelling agency and going to Italy in January 2020. Odhiang was featured on the cover of Le Monde d'Hermès in September 2021. Since then on the covers of AnOther, Harper's Bazaar France, Harper's Bazaar Italia, i-D, M Le Magazine du Monde, Pop, and more.

In February 2024, Odhiang walked 34 shows, including Balenciaga, Chanel, Fendi, Gucci, Hermès, Isabel Marant, Louis Vuitton, Prada, and Versace. At the time she had also starred in six advertising campaigns for Saint Laurent. In October 2024, Odhiang made her Victoria's Secret Fashion Show debut on the Victoria's Secret Fashion Show 2024 runway.

In October 2025, Odhiang closed the show of the debut Chanel collection of Matthieu Blazy, spinning, clapping, and smiling down the runway, even embracing Blazy in a hug. The moment went viral. Russh commended her for "breaking tradition" and the South China Morning Post described it as "a triumphant celebration", "[Odhiang] was radiating with joy as she glided on the ramp, clapping in honour of the flawless finale...". Odhiang later told Vogue, "[Blazy] had told me, 'This is your moment, this is a chance for you to just enjoy it, do what you do, and do you,' and so that's exactly what I did.".

In February 2026, Odhiang was featured on the cover of Vogue Italia.
