= Alasdair McLellan =

British photographer (born 1974)

- Born: 1974 (age 51–52); Doncaster
- Education: University of Nottingham
- Occupation: photographer

Alasdair McLellan (born 1974) is a British photographer. His work has been shown at the Institute of Contemporary Arts in London and is held in the collection of the National Portrait Gallery, also in London.

== Life and work ==
McLellan was born in 1974 in Doncaster, South Yorkshire.

== Publications ==
- Umbro by Kim Jones (2005)
- Ultimate Clothing Company (2013)
- Ceremony (2016)
- The Palace (2016)
- Blondey 15-21 (2019)
- Home and Away Volume I — Biscuit Billy's (2023)
- Home and Away Volume II — Seventh Heaven (2023)

== Exhibitions ==
=== Solo exhibitions ===
- Never Gonna Give You Up, Joerg Koch, Berlin/032c, London, 2012
- Alasdair McLellan and Lev Tanju: The Palace, Institute of Contemporary Arts (ICA), London, 2016
- Alasdair McLellan for Margaret Howell, London, 2017
- Here We Are, in collaboration with Burberry, London, 2017

=== Group exhibitions ===
- North: Identity, Photography, Fashion, Open Eye Gallery, Liverpool, 2017; North: Fashioning Identity, Somerset House, London, 2017/2018

== Collections ==
McLellan's work is held in the following permanent collection:

- National Portrait Gallery, London: 4 prints (as of September 2020)

== Music videos ==
- Kylie Minogue — "Santa Baby"
- The xx — "On Hold"
- The xx — "Say Something Loving"
- The xx — "I Dare You"
- Saint Etienne — I've Been Trying to Tell You (visual companion to the 2021 album of the same name)
- Pet Shop Boys — "Loneliness"
