= David Sims (photographer) =

British fashion photographer (born 1966)

- Born: 1966 (age 59–60); Sheffield, England
- Occupation: Photographer
- Partner: Luella Bartley
- Website: www.davidsims.com

David Sims (born 1966) is a British fashion photographer who first made his name in the early 1990s.

== Commercial career ==
Sims was born in Sheffield. He worked first as a photographer's assistant with Robert Erdmann and Norman Watson. He was taken on by a photography agency and his work began to feature in editorial pages of magazines. He has also worked in advertising, creating images for brands.

== Exhibitions ==
International exhibitions of Sims' work have been held at the Museum of Contemporary Art Tokyo, Fotomuseum Winterthur, Switzerland and Deichtorhallen in Hamburg.

The Institute of Contemporary Arts (ICA), London held a solo exhibition of Sims' work in 2013.

== Collections ==
His work is held in the permanent collections of London's Victoria and Albert Museum (V&A) and Tate Modern.

== Awards ==
Sims was named young fashion photographer of the year twice (1994 and 1996) at the Hyères International Fashion and Photography Festival.

== Personal life ==
Sims once lived in Cornwall with his partner, the fashion designer Luella Bartley. They now live in London.
