= Mikael Jansson (photographer) =

Swedish fashion photographer and director

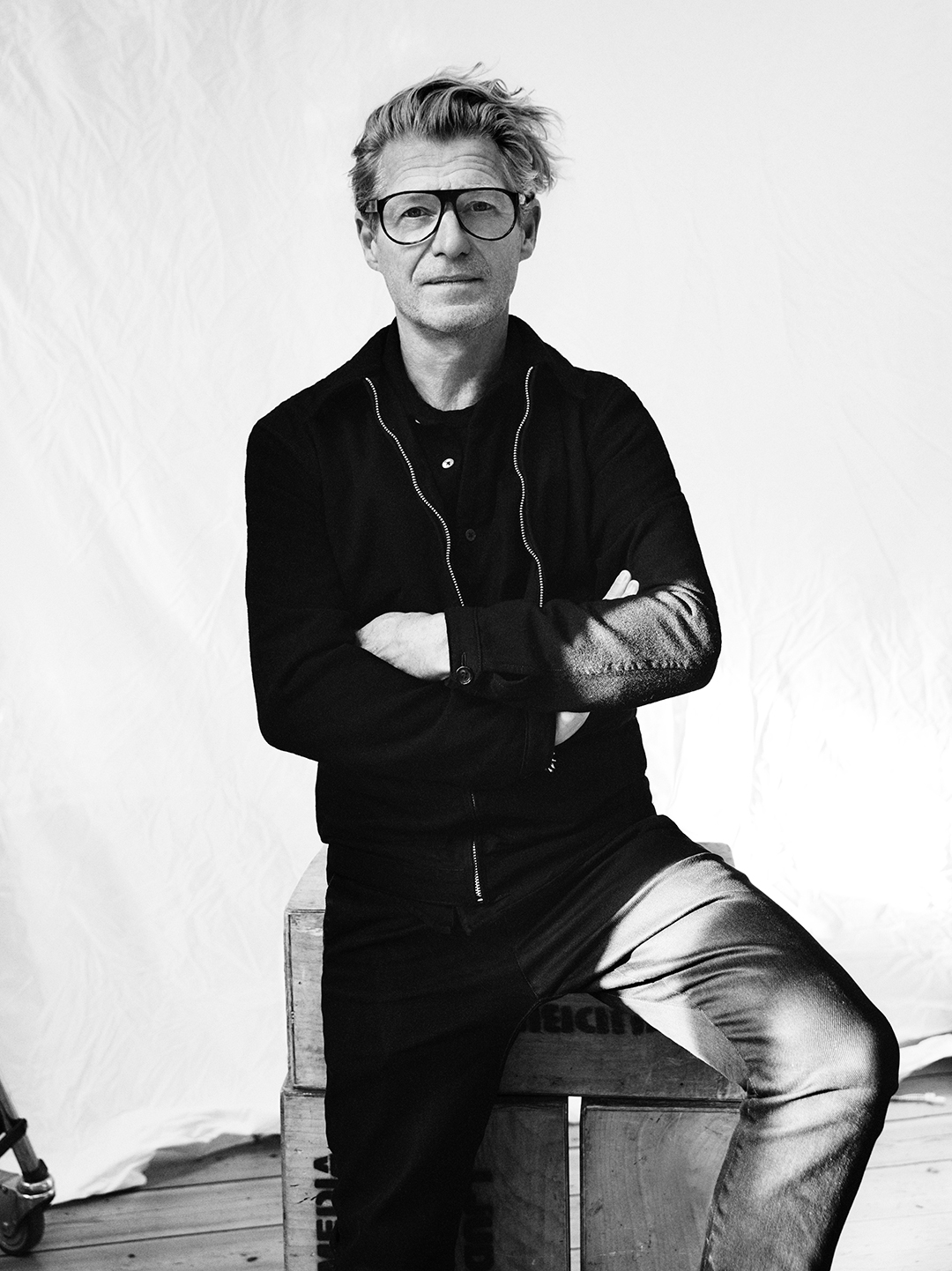
- Occupation: Photographer

Mikael Jansson is a Swedish fashion photographer
