= Guy Bourdin =

French artist and fashion photographer (1928–1991)

- Born: 2 December 1928; Paris, France
- Died: 29 March 1991 (aged 62); Paris, France
- Children: 1
- Website: www.guybourdin.org

Guy Bourdin (French pronunciation: [ɡi buʁdɛ̃]; 2 December 1928 – 29 March 1991) was a French artist and fashion photographer known for his highly stylized and provocative images. From 1955, Bourdin worked mostly with Vogue as well as other publications including Harper's Bazaar. He shot ad campaigns for Chanel, Charles Jourdan, Pentax and Bloomingdale's.

His work is collected by important institutions including Tate in London, MoMA, San Francisco Museum of Modern Art and Getty Museum. The first retrospective exhibition of his work was held at the Victoria & Albert Museum in London in 2003, and then toured the National Gallery of Victoria in Melbourne, Australia, and the Galerie nationale du Jeu de Paume in Paris. The Tate is permanently exhibiting a part of its collection (one of the largest) with works made between 1950 and 1955.

He is considered one of the best-known photographers of fashion and advertising of the second half of the 20th century. He set the stage for a new kind of fashion photography. "While conventional fashion images make beauty and clothing their central elements, Bourdin’s photographs offer a radical alternative."

== Life and career ==
Bourdin was born 2 December 1928 in Paris, France. His parents separated when he was an infant and he was sent to live with his paternal grandparents who owned a house in Normandy. His grandparents were also owners of a restaurant in Paris called Brasserie Bourdin. When his father, who was only 18 at the time of his birth, remarried, Bourdin was again under his care. Apparently Bourdin only saw his mother once when she arrived at the Brasserie to present him with a gift. Thereafter, his only communication with his mother took place in the side-by-side phone booths of the Brasserie where his participation would be ensured by a locked door. At the age of eighteen Bourdin embarked on a cycling tour in Provence during which he met art-dealer Lucien Henry. Bourdin passed six months living at Henry's house where he concentrated on painting and drawing until it was time for his mandatory military service.

Bourdin was first introduced to photography during his service in the Air Force. Stationed in Dakar (1948–49), Bourdin received his initial photographic training, working as an aerial photographer. When he returned to Paris after his service, he supported himself with a number of menial jobs, including as a salesman of camera lenses and also continued to paint, draw and take pictures. During this time he exhibited some of his drawings and in 1950 sought out the mentorship of American expatriate and prodigious Surrealist Man Ray. Bourdin was turned away from Man Ray's door six times by his wife and on the seventh finally succeeding in gaining the artist's company when Man Ray himself answered the door and invited Bourdin in. Bourdin had indeed succeeded in gaining the confidence of Man Ray, who later wrote the catalogue for Bourdin's first exhibition in 1952 after accepting him as a protégé.

Bourdin made his first exhibition of drawings and paintings at Galerie, Rue de la Bourgogne, Paris. His first photographic exhibition was in 1953. He exhibited under the pseudonym "Edwin Hallan" in his early career. His first fashion shots were published in the February 1955 issue of Vogue Paris. As a contemporary of Helmut Newton, who also worked extensively for Vogue, Bourdin helped establish what contemporary photography is today. Newton observed, "Between him and me the magazine became pretty irresistible in many ways and we complemented each other. If he had been alone or I had been alone it wouldn't have worked." He continued to work for the magazine until the late 1980s.

An editor of Vogue magazine introduced Bourdin to shoe designer Charles Jourdan, who became his patron, and Bourdin shot Jourdan's ad campaigns between 1967 and 1981. His quirky anthropomorphic compositions, intricate mise-en-scene ads were recognised as distinctly Bourdin-esque and were always eagerly anticipated by the media.

In 1985, Bourdin turned down the Grand Prix National de la Photographie, awarded by the French Ministry of Culture, but his name is retained on the list of award winners. He died of cancer in 1991. According to Manolo Blahnik, Bourdin's creative legacy is so immense that his shoes will never be filled by another.

== Style ==
Guy Bourdin was among the first to imagine fashion photographies that contained fascinating narratives, dramatic effects with intense color saturation, hyper-realism and cropped compositions while he established the idea that the product is secondary to the image.

== Publications ==
- Guy Bourdin. HNA, 2003. ISBN 978-0810966055.
- Exhibit A: Guy Bourdin. London: Jonathan Cape, 2003. ISBN 978-0224062046.
- Guy Bourdin. London: Phaidon, 2006. ISBN 978-0714843032.
- A Message For You. Göttingen: Steidl Dangin, 2006. ISBN 3-86521-197-6.
- Guy Bourdin (Stern Fotographie Portfolio). Hamburg: Stern, 2010. ISBN 978-3652000024. Bilingual edition.
- Guy Bourdin: Polaroids. Xavier Barral, 2010. ISBN 978-2915173567.
- Guy Bourdin: In Between. Göttingen: Steidl, 2010. ISBN 978-3869300337.
- A Message For You. Göttingen: Steidl Dangin, 2013. ISBN 978-3869305516.
- Untouched. Göttingen: Steidl, 2017. ISBN 978-3869309347.
- A Message For You. Göttingen: Steidl, 2017. ISBN 978-3-86930-551-6 .
- Guy Bourdin: The Portraits. Studio des Acacias: Mazarine, 2017. ISBN 979-1097151003.
- Guy Bourdin: Image Maker. Assouline, 2017. ISBN 978-1614286356.
- Guy Bourdin: Untouched. Steidl, 2017. ISBN 978-3869309347.

== Awards ==
- 1988: Infinity Award, International Center of Photography, New York, for his 1987 Chanel advertising campaign.

== Collections ==
Bourdin's work is held in the following public collections:

- Tate, London: 27 works acquired in 2014
- Victoria and Albert Museum, London
- Museum of Modern Art, New York
- National Portrait Gallery, London
- International Center of Photography, New York City
- Getty Museum, Los Angeles, California
- San Francisco Museum of Modern Art, San Francisco, California
- Museum of Fine Arts, Houston, Houston, Texas
- Musée de l'Elysée, Lausanne, Switzerland
- Detroit Institute of Arts, Detroit, Portrait of Kelly Williams at Académie Colarossi

== Solo exhibitions ==
- 1950 First exhibition of drawings and paintings at Galerie, Rue de Bourgogne, Paris.
- 1952 Exhibition of photographs at Galerie 29, The catalogue includes an introduction by Man Ray. Paris.
- 1953 Exhibition of photographs under the pseudonym "Edwin Hallan" at Galerie Huit, Paris.
- 1954 Exhibition of drawings at Galerie de Beaune, Paris.
- 1955 Exhibition of drawings at Galerie des Amis des Arts, Paris.
- 1955 Exhibition of paintings at Galerie Charpentier, Paris.
- 1956 Exhibition of drawings at Galerie de Seine, Paris.
- 1957 Exhibition of paintings and drawings at the Peter Deitsch Gallery, New York City.
- 1961 Salon International du Portrait Photographie
- 2003–2013 The Retrospective, Victoria and Albert Museum, London; National Gallery Victoria, Melbourne, 2004; Galerie nationale du Jeu de Paume, Paris, 2004; Foam Fotografiemuseum Amsterdam (Foam), Amsterdam, 2004; Kunstsammlung Nordrhein-Westfalen, Düsseldorf, Germany, 2005; National Art Museum of China, Beijing, China, 2005; Shanghai Art Museum, Shanghai, China, 2006; Tokyo Metropolitan Museum of Photography, Tokyo, 2006; Daimaru Umeda Museum, Osaka, Japan, 2006; KunstHausWien, Vienna, Austria, 2008; FotoMuseum, Antwerp, Belgium, 2008; Moscow House of Photography, Moscow, 2009; Museu Brasileiro de Escultura (MuBE), São Paulo, Brazil, 2009; Museu de Arte Contemporânea, Porto Alegre, Brazil 2011; Deichtorhallen, Hamburg, Germany, 2013.
- 2006–2014 A Message For You, Phillips, New York City, 2006; Peggy Guggenheim Collection, Venice, Italy, 2006; HSBC Foundation, Paris, 2006; Hollywood Centre, Hong Kong, 2007; Today Art Museum, Beijing, 2007; Gallery Carla Sozzani, Milan, Italy, 2009; Photography Festival, Cannes, France, 2009; Canal Isabel II, Madrid, 2010; Louise Alexander Gallery, Porto Cervo, Italy, 2014.
- 2009 Ses films, Le Bon Marché, Paris, 2009; 10 Corso Como, Seoul, South Korea.
- 2010 In Between, French Consulate, New York City.
- 2013 Guy Bourdin: Archives, Louise Alexander Gallery, Porto Cervo, Italy.
- 2014 Guy Bourdin: Image Maker, Somerset House, London.
- 2015 Guy Bourdin: Mise en abyme, Paris Photo, Louise Alexander Gallery, Paris.
- 2015 Guy Bourdin: Avant Garde, Fotografiska, Stockholm.
- 2016 Guy Bourdin: The Portraits, Studio des Acacias and Louise Alexander Gallery, Paris.
- 2017 Guy Bourdin, solo show at Photo London 2017, Louise Alexander Gallery, Porto Cervo, Italy
- 2017 Guy Bourdin, Louise Alexander Gallery, Porto Cervo, Italy
- 2017 Guy Bourdin: Image Maker, Helmut Newton Foundation, Berlin
- 2017 Femininities - Guy Bourdin, Maison Chloé, Paris
- 2019 Campredon Art Center, Isle sur la Sorgue, France
- 2019 Museum of Photography Charles Nègre, Nice, France
