= List of V magazine cover models =

This article is a catalog of actresses and models who have appeared on V magazine, starting with the magazine's first issue in September 1999.

== 1999 ==
Issue	Cover model	Photographer
#1. September/October	Jude Law	Mario Testino
#2. November/December		

== 2000 ==
Issue	Cover model	Photographer
#3. January/February	Hannelore Knuts	Inez & Vinoodh
#4. March/April		
#5. May/June	Anouck Lepere	Inez & Vinoodh
#6. July/August	Nina Heimlich & Liya Kebede	Mario Testino
#7. September/October	Marina Dias & Mia Hessner	Mario Testino
#8. November/December	Angela Lindvall	Inez & Vinoodh

== 2001 ==
Issue	Cover model	Photographer
#9. January/February	Carlos Bokelman	Mario Testino
#10. March/April	Stephanie Seymour & Trish Goff	Mario Testino
#11. May/June		
#12. July/August	Rodrigo Santoro	Mario Testino
#13. September/October	Fanni Boström & Liisa Winkler	Inez & Vinoodh
#14. November/December	Linda Evangelista	Mario Testino

== 2002 ==
Issue	Cover model	Photographer
#15. January/February	Fanni Boström	Mario Testino
#16. March/April	Kylie Minogue	Mario Testino
#17. May/June		
#18. July/August	David Bowie	Mario Testino
#19. September/October	Christy Turlington	Richard Phillips & Inez & Vinoodh
#20. November/December	Rohini Tiwari	Inez & Vinoodh

== 2003 ==
Issue	Cover model	Photographer
#21. January/February	Iman	Mario Testino
#22. March/April	Carmen Kass	Inez & Vinoodh
#23. May/June	Stella Tennant	Inez & Vinoodh
#24. July/August	Daria Werbowy	David Sims
#25. September/October	Beyoncé	Mario Testino
#26. November/December	Kate Moss	Mario Testino

== 2004 ==
Issue	Cover model	Photographer
#27. January/February	Linda Evangelista	Inez & Vinoodh
#28. March/April	Janet Jackson	Inez & Vinoodh
#29. May/June	Laila Ali & Missy Elliott	David Sims
#30. July/August	Alicia Keys	Mario Sorrenti
#31. September/October	Gwen Stefani	Mario Testino
#32. November/December	Alex Kapranos	David Sims

== 2005 ==
Issue	Cover model	Photographer
#33. SPRING PREVIEW 2005		
#34. SPRING 2005	Destiny's Child	Inez & Vinoodh
#35. SUMMER 2005	Kate Moss	Inez & Vinoodh
#36. FALL PREVIEW 2005	Daria Werbowy	Bruce Weber
#37. FALL 2005	Mary J. Blige	Mario Testino
#38. WINTER 2005	Jennifer Connelly	Mert & Marcus

== 2006 ==
Issue	Cover model	Photographer
#39. SPRING PREVIEW 2006	Mariah Carey	Karl Lagerfeld
#40. SPRING 2006	Kate Moss	David Sims
#41. SUMMER 2006	Freja Beha Erichsen; Daria Werbowy; Gemma Ward	Mario Testino
#42. FALL PREVIEW 2006	Drew Barrymore	David Sims
#43. FALL 2006	Penélope Cruz	Inez & Vinoodh
#44. WINTER 2006	Courtney Love	Mario Testino

== 2007 ==
Issue	Cover model	Photographer
#45. SPRING PREVIEW 2007	Janet Jackson	Jean-Paul Goude
#46. SPRING 2007	Kate Bosworth	Mario Sorrenti
#47. SUMMER 2007	Catherine McNeil	Mario Testino
#48. FALL PREVIEW 2007	Christy Turlington & Raquel Zimmermann	Inez & Vinoodh
#49. FALL 2007	Brad Pitt	Mario Testino
#50. WINTER 2007	Raquel Zimmermann	David Sims

== 2008 ==
Issue	Cover model	Photographer
#51. SPRING PREVIEW 2008	Demi Moore	Mario Testino
#52. SPRING 2008	Gwen Stefani	Mert & Marcus
#53. SUMMER 2008	Gwyneth Paltrow	Mario Sorrenti
#54. FALL PREVIEW 2008	Gisele Bündchen	Mario Testino
#55. FALL 2008	Abbey Lee Kershaw, Agyness Deyn, Anja Rubik, Anna Selezneva, Christy Turlington, Daria Werbowy, Enikő Mihalik, Eva Herzigová, Frankie Rayder, Lara Stone, Małgosia Bela, Naomi Campbell, Natasha Poly & Sunniva Stordahl	Inez & Vinoodh
#56. WINTER 2008	Beyoncé	Bruce Weber

== 2009 ==
Issue	Cover model	Photographer
#57. SPRING PREVIEW 2009	Grace Jones	Jean-Paul Goude
#58. SPRING 2009	Natalia Vodianova & Luke Grimes	Mario Testino
#59. SUMMER 2009	Claudia Schiffer, Daria Werbowy, Eva Herzigová, Gisele Bündchen, Kate Moss & Naomi Campbell	Mario Testino
#60. FALL PREVIEW 2009	Cameron Diaz	Mert & Marcus
#61. FALL 2009	Lady Gaga	Mario Testino
#62. WINTER 2009	Natalie Portman	Mario Testino

== 2010 ==
Issue	Cover model	Photographer
#63. SPRING PREVIEW 2010	Dakota Fanning & Gabourey Sidibe	Inez & Vinoodh
#64. SPRING 2010	Kirsten Dunst	Mario Testino
#65. SUMMER 2010	Scarlett Johansson	Inez & Vinoodh
#66. FALL PREVIEW 2010	Adriana Lima, Enikő Mihalik, Isabeli Fontana, Lily Donaldson & Natasha Poly	Mario Sorrenti
#67. FALL 2010	Lady Gaga & Marc Jacobs; Tyson Ballou & Marina Abramović	Mario Testino
#68. WINTER 2010	Jane Fonda, Sigourney Weaver, & Susan Sarandon	Inez & Vinoodh

== 2011 ==
Issue	Cover model	Photographer
#69. SPRING PREVIEW 2011	Nicki Minaj	Inez & Vinoodh
#70. SPRING 2011	Britney Spears	Mario Testino
#71. SUMMER 2011	Lady Gaga	Inez & Vinoodh
#72. FALL PREVIEW 2011	Penélope Cruz	Mert & Marcus
#73. FALL 2011	Kate Winslet	Mario Testino
#74. WINTER 2011	Bambi Northwood-Blyth & Lindsey Wixson; Candice Swanepoel & Joan Smalls; Daphne Groeneveld & Saskia de Brauw; Sui He & Hanaa Ben Abdesslem	Terry Richardson

== 2012 ==
Issue	Cover model	Photographer
#75. SPRING PREVIEW 2012	Justin Bieber	Inez & Vinoodh
#76. SPRING 2012	Jennifer Lopez	Mario Testino
#77. SUMMER 2012	Kesha	Inez & Vinoodh
#78. FALL PREVIEW 2012	Ava Smith, Thairine Garcia, & Kati Nescher; Grimes, Sky Ferreira, & Charli XCX; Stef van der Laan, Daniela Braga & Kati Nescher	Sebastian Faena
#79. FALL 2012	Nicole Kidman	Mario Testino
#80. WINTER 2012	Scarlett Johansson	Jean-Paul Goude

== 2013 ==
Issue	Cover model	Photographer
#81. SPRING PREVIEW 2013	Kristen Stewart	Inez & Vinoodh
#82. SPRING 2013	Rihanna & Kate Moss	Mario Testino
#83. SUMMER 2013	Miley Cyrus	Mario Testino
#84. FALL PREVIEW 2013	Prince	Inez & Vinoodh
#85. FALL 2013	Lady Gaga	Inez & Vinoodh
#86. WINTER 2013	Winona Ryder	Mario Testino

== 2014 ==
Issue	Cover model	Photographer
#87. SPRING PREVIEW 2014	Kate Upton	Inez & Vinoodh
#88. SPRING 2014	Banks, Haim, Lorde, & Say Lou Lou	Inez & Vinoodh
#89. SUMMER 2014	Katy Perry & Madonna	Steven Klein
#90. FALL PREVIEW 2014	Clark Bockelman & Amanda Murphy; Emily DiDonato & Sean O'Pry; Joan Smalls & Aurelien Muller; Matthew Terry & Bridget Malcolm	Mario Testino
#91. FALL 2014	Miley Cyrus	Karl Lagerfeld
#92. WINTER 2014	Nicki Minaj	Mario Testino

== 2015 ==
Issue	Cover model	Photographer
#93. SPRING PREVIEW 2015	FKA Twigs, Jessie Ware, Sam Smith, & Tinashe	Inez & Vinoodh
#94. SPRING 2015	Selena Gomez	Inez & Vinoodh
#95. SUMMER 2015	Rihanna	Steven Klein
#96. FALL PREVIEW 2015	Bella & Gigi Hadid	Steven Klein
#97. FALL 2015	Lana Del Rey	Steven Klein
#98. WINTER 2015	Brad Pitt	Inez & Vinoodh

== 2016 ==
Issue	Cover model	Photographer
#99. SPRING PREVIEW 2016	Asia Kinney	Terry Richardson
#99. SPRING PREVIEW 2016	Cierra Skye	Nick Knight
#99. SPRING PREVIEW 2016	Daphne Guinness & Lady Gaga; Isabella Blow; Lee Alexander McQueen	Steven Klein
#99. SPRING PREVIEW 2016	Hedi Slimane	Karl Lagerfeld
#99. SPRING PREVIEW 2016	Karl Lagerfeld	Hedi Slimane
#99. SPRING PREVIEW 2016	Lady Gaga	Chadwick Tyler; Inez & Vinoodh; Steven Klein
#99. SPRING PREVIEW 2016	Lady Gaga & Inez van Lamsweerde	Inez & Vinoodh
#99. SPRING PREVIEW 2016	Lady Gaga & Taylor Kinney	Taylor Kinney
#100. SPRING 2016	Britney Spears	Mario Testino
#101. SUMMER 2016	Charlize Theron	Collier Schorr
#102. FALL PREVIEW 2016	Elle Fanning; Bella Heathcote; Abbey Lee Kershaw	Steven Klein
#103. FALL 2016	Lucky Blue Smith & Kacy Hill; Taylor Hill & Troye Sivan	Mario Testino
#104. WINTER 2016	Alicia Keys, Brittany O'Grady, Ryan Destiny, Jude Demorest, Grimes, Kelly Rohrbach, Young Thug	Inez & Vinoodh

== 2017 ==
Issue	Cover model	Photographer
#105. SPRING PREVIEW 2017	Amber Valletta, Carolyn Murphy, Ellen Rosa, Joan Smalls, Kendall Jenner, & Lara Stone	Mario Testino
#106. SPRING 2017	Kristen Stewart	Mario Testino
#107. SUMMER 2017	Dane DeHaan & Cara Delevingne	Karl Lagerfeld
#108. FALL PREVIEW 2017	Lana Del Rey	Steven Klein
#109. FALL 2017	Lady Gaga	Hedi Slimane
#110. WINTER 2017	Daisy Ridley	Inez & Vinoodh

== 2018 ==
Issue	Cover model	Photographer
#111. SPRING PREVIEW 2018	Jules Horn; Jaad Belgaïd; Sam Smith; Grace Elizabeth	Nicola Formichetti
#112. SPRING 2018	Mariah Carey	Mario Testino
#113. SUMMER 2018	Dua Lipa & SZA	Inez & Vinoodh
#114. FALL PREVIEW 2018	Gigi Hadid	Mario Sorrenti
#115. FALL 2018	Jorja Smith	Sølve Sundsbø
#116. WINTER 2018	Lily-Rose Depp	Luke Gilford

== 2019 ==
Issue	Cover model	Photographer
#117. SPRING PREVIEW 2019	Charlotte Lawrence, Kelsey Lu, & King Princess	Inez & Vinoodh
#118. SPRING 2019	Lady Gaga	Jean-Paul Goude
#119. SUMMER 2019	Lizzo & Alton Mason	Chris Colls
#120. FALL PREVIEW 2019	Bella Hadid	Mert & Marcus
#121. FALL 2019	Billie Eilish	Inez & Vinoodh
#122. WINTER 2019	Naomi Scott; Kristen Stewart; Ella Balinska	Carin Backoff

== 2020 ==
Issue	Cover model	Photographer
#123. SPRING PREVIEW 2020	Margot Robbie	Chris Colls
#124. SPRING 2020	Hunter Schafer	Inez & Vinoodh
#125. SUMMER 2020	Adut Akech, Adwoa Aboah, Grace Elizabeth, He Cong, Kaia Gerber, Lila Moss, Lola Nicon, Mariam de Vinzelle, Mica Argañaraz, Rebecca Leigh Longendyke, Rianne Van Rompaey, Vaughan Ollier, Vivienne Rohner, Ugbad Abdi, & Zso Varju	Inez & Vinoodh
#126. FALL 2020	Laura Harrier	Inez & Vinoodh
#127. WINTER 2020	Bella Hadid, Chris Evans, Halsey, Jaden Smith, Janaya Future Khan, Janelle Monáe, Jennifer Lawrence, Julianne Moore, Mariah Carey, Megan Rapinoe, Paperboy Prince, & Taylor Swift	Inez & Vinoodh

== 2021 ==
Issue	Cover model	Photographer
#128. SPRING PREVIEW 2021	Andra Day	Djeneba Aduayom
#129. SPRING 2021	Doja Cat	Steven Klein
#129. SPRING 2021	Indya Moore	Adrienne Raquel
#130. SUMMER 2021	Naomi Campbell, Anok Yai, Imaan Hammam, & Kendall Jenner	Mario Sorrenti
#131. FALL PREVIEW 2021	Abby Champion, Vinson Fraley, Ashley Graham, Nyja Abdullah, Eileen Gu, Emily Ratajkowski, Taras Romanov and Hailey Bieber	Inez and Vinoodh
#132. FALL 2021	Olivia Rodrigo	Inez and Vinoodh
#133. WINTER 2021	Kacey Musgraves	Blair Getz Mezibov

== 2022 ==
Issue	Cover model	Photographer
#134. SPRING 2022	Gigi Hadid	Mario Sorrenti
#135. SPRING/SUMMER 2022	Billie Eilish	Hedi Slimane
#136. SUMMER 2022	Gisele Bündchen	Blair Getz Mezibov
#137. FALL PREVIEW 2022	Iris Law; Malika Louback; Evan Mock; Charli XCX; Sky Ferreira; Shygirl; Rina Sawayama; The Kid Laroi; Eartheater	Richard Burbridge and Nicola Formichetti
#138. FALL 2022	Lalisa	Mok Jungwook
#139. WINTER 2022	Adut Akech; Imaan Hammam; Gigi Hadid; He Cong	Adrienne Raquel

== 2023 ==
Issue	Cover model	Photographer
#140. SPRING PREVIEW 2023	Lily Collins	Nathaniel Goldberg
#141. SPRING 2023	Ethel Cain	Steven Klein
#142. SUMMER 2023	Halle Bailey	Rob Rusling
#143. FALL PREVIEW 2023	NewJeans: Minji, Danielle, Hanni, Hyein, and Haerin; Doja Cat	Cho Gi-Seok; Hedi Slimane
#144. FALL 2023	Hailey Bieber; América González; Amar Akway; Lulu Tenney; Raquel Zimmermann; Iris Law; Margaux Lion; Vivienne Rohner; Amelia Gray; Rachel Marx	Inez & Vinoodh
#145. WINTER 2023	Cailee Spaeny	Rob Rusling

== 2024 ==
Issue	Cover model	Photographer
#146. SPRING PREVIEW 2024	Linda Evangelista	Steven Klein
