= Fashion of Madonna =

Aspect of Madonna's career

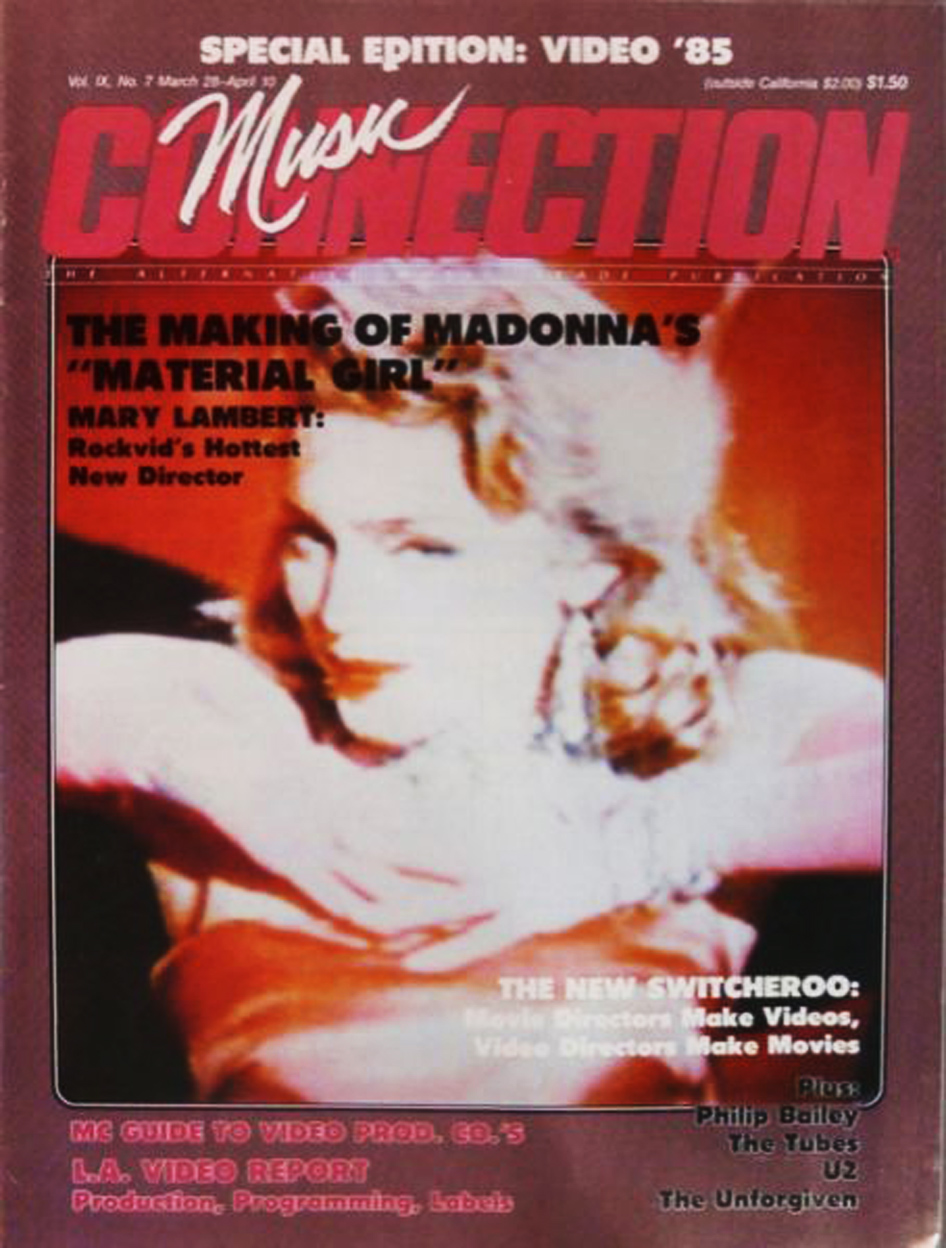
Madonna on the March 1985 cover of Music Connection

American singer Madonna (born 1958) has received extensive coverage in fashion journalism. Madonna's forays into the fashion industry have included attending runway shows and the Met Gala, as well as owning fashion brands. She has appeared on the covers of numerous magazines and became the first musician to complete Vogue's Big Four. She has served as muse for various designers and photographers and has been credited with raising the profile of several of them.

Throughout her career, Madonna's evolving styles and aesthetics influenced fashion trends and attracted both positive and negative reactions in mainstream media. She was included in several best-and worst-dressed lists and featured in influence rankings such as Time's All-TIME 100 Fashion Icons, Style and Design (2012). She was also included in People's Hall of Fame of Worst Dressed (2004), while fashion critic Richard Blackwell included Madonna in his book Worst: 30 Years of Fashion Fiascos (1991). Madonna received accolades for her fashion, including the inaugural Versace Award at the VH1 Fashion Awards in 1998 and the Style Icon from the Elle Style Awards in 2007. However, she also received less favorable distinctions such as the Worst Dressed Person Award from the Smash Hits Poll Winners Party in 1993 and 1994. Photographs and clothing associated with Madonna have been exhibited in museums and other venues.

Madonna has also attracted criticism and generated controversy over her fashion. This include criticism for her usage of religious imagery and sexual overtones. During her early career, Madonna's influence on the fashion choices of her teenage fan base was the subject of attention and criticism. She has also faced criticism over cultural appropriation and from animal-rights groups. Her fashion sense has been cited as examples of consumerism and narcissism.

== Fashion image ==
=== Background ===
Stylight magazine stated that "much of her popularity" was attributed to her sense of style, and the Hinduism Today (1998) reported that she became famous for her constantly changing makeup. Billboard staffers commented in 2015 that "her sense of style became as influential as her chart-topping tunes". Authors of The 1980s (2007) suggested that "Madonna's influence on fashion eclipsed her music", and feminist scholar Camille Paglia argued in 2005 that Madonna "became a fashion icon more than a music pioneer". Writing in The Journal of Popular Culture in 2014, associate professor José Blanco observed that fashion critics, designers and scholars had examined her influence on fashion. Additionally, Louise Gray of i-D magazine commented in 2018 that Madonna had come "under scrutiny for her outfits over the best part of four decades".

Madonna also developed a reputation as a fashion provocateur, with her style and influence attracting criticism and controversies.

=== Styles ===
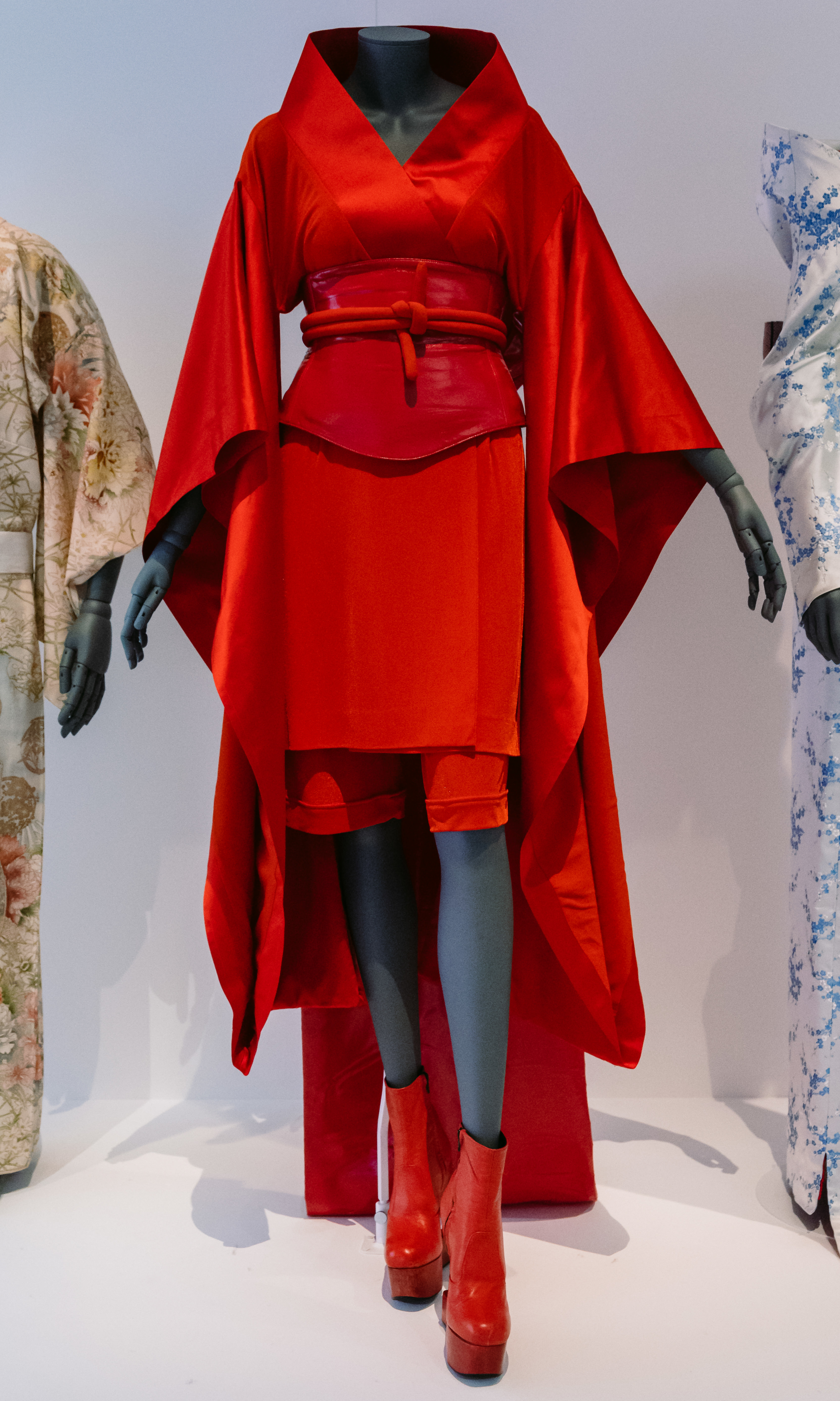
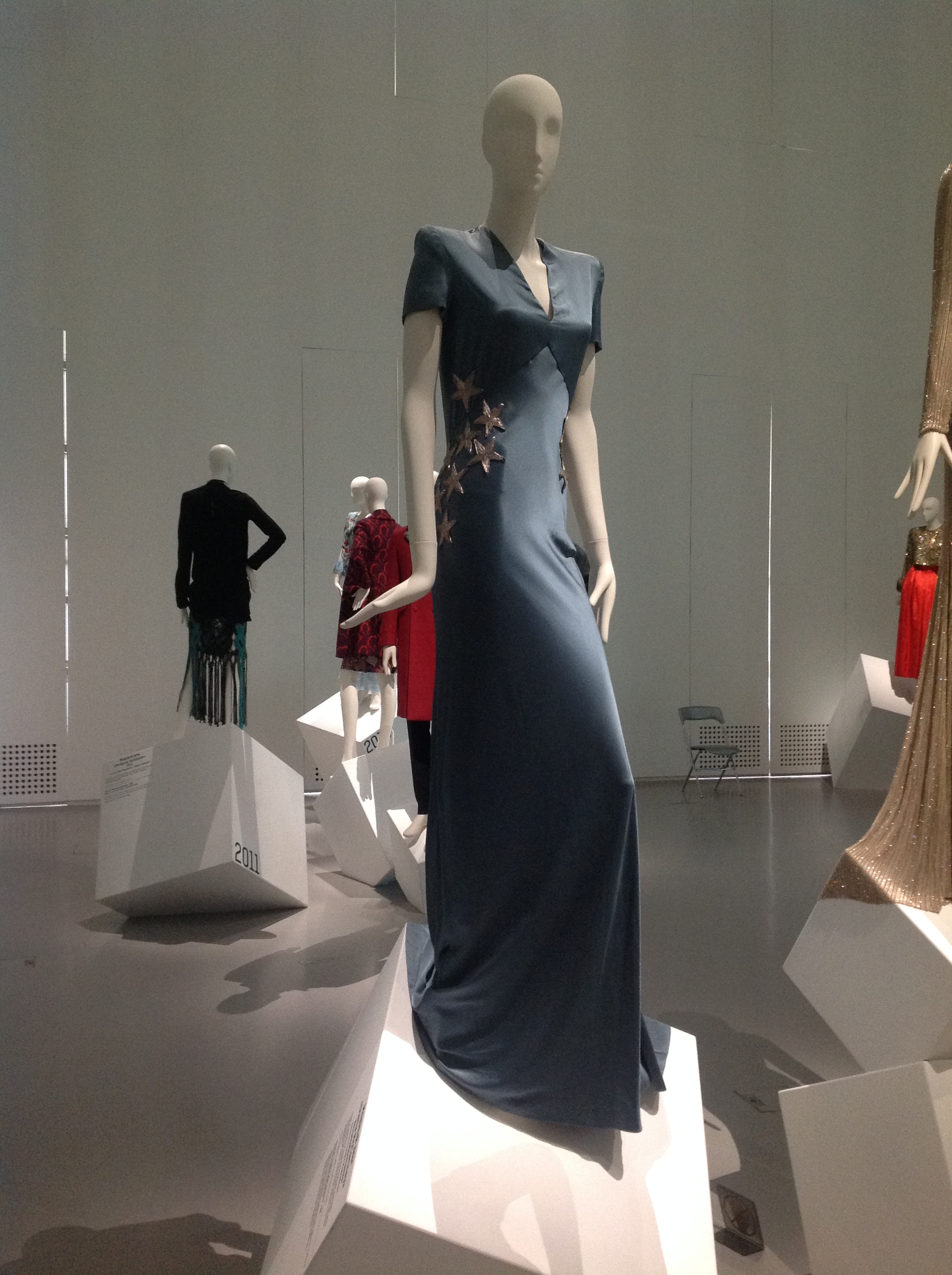
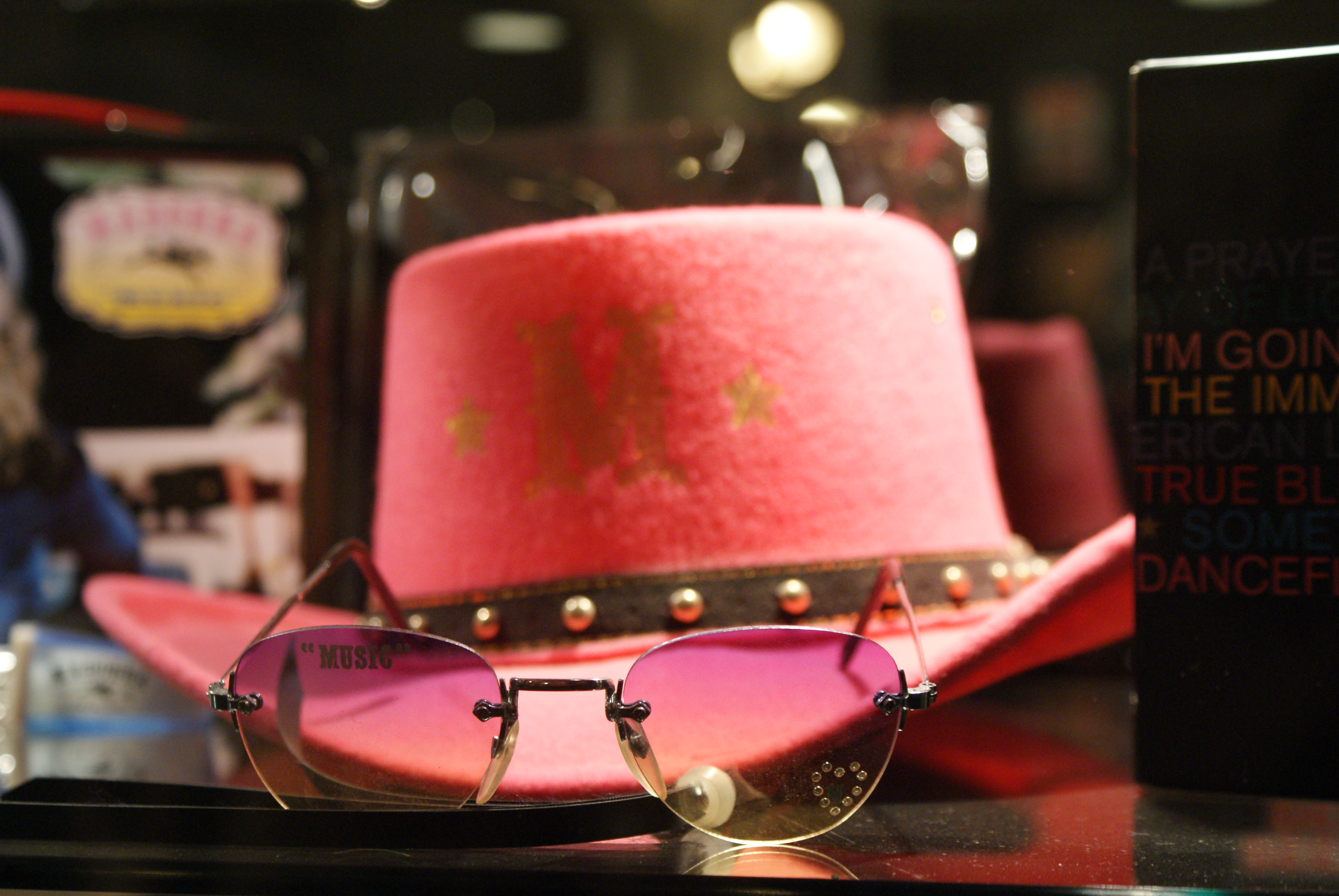
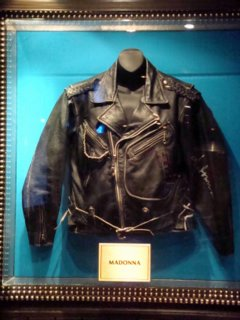
Clothing and accessories worn by Madonna, featured in exhibitions.

Observers such as Barbara Foley of Los Angeles Times (1990) have traced Madonna's relationship with fashion back to her childhood, noting Madonna's father influenced her awareness of fashion without realizing it, with the dress code imposed in her strict Catholic upbringing, and that she saw "how potent a certain way of dress could be". BBC's Katya Foreman (2015) stated that Madonna "saw clothes as a tool of rebellion from early on".

Madonna explored different styles and looks, both on and off stage. The French fashion magazine Crash (2015) explained that she is known for having an "extravagant taste". Douglas Kellner wrote in Oh Fashion (1994) that fashion became inseparable from Madonna's aesthetic practices—including interviews and music videos. Heart UK described the evolution of her styles and looks as having been "documented through the years", while Foreman called it an "expansive catalogue of looks". However, Pamela Church Gibson of the London College of Fashion observed a notable lack of academic discussion of Madonna in relation to high fashion.

Biographer J. Randy Taraborrelli observed that religious symbols became a crucial part of her fashion. Foreman noted that Madonna wanted to be either a film star or nun when she grew up, and "extensively explored both roles through clothes ever since". Through her clothing, she paid tribute to women such as Marilyn Monroe, Marie Antoinette and Eva Perón. Allison Berry of Time described "Vogue" (1990), as "perhaps the most fashion song of all time", noting that she paid tribute through the spoken word Strike a Pose section to Hollywood glamour and icons. Sydney Nowak of KOST stated that Madonna brings a tinge of grunge to her fashion. She has incorporated aesthetics such as cowgirl, ghetto fabulous, military styles, masculine pieces, and androgynous imagery, as well as thrift shop looks, and "dirtbag-chic". Madonna also drew on fashion imagery from Asian cultures, particularly Japan and India during the 1990s.

=== Fashion trends and influence ===
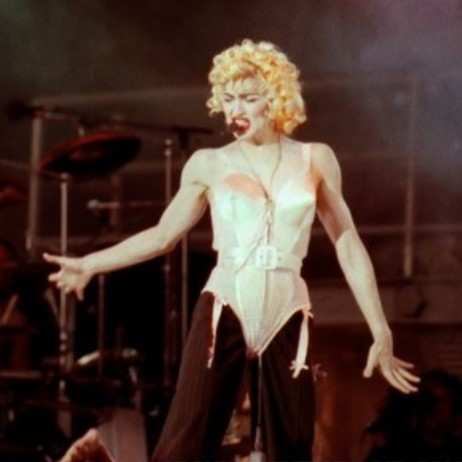
Madonna wearing the Jean Paul Gaultier pink cone bra during the Blond Ambition World Tour (1990). The outfit has been associated with the underwear as outerwear trend.

Madonna was described as a fashion trendsetter. According to fashion editor Robin Givhan (1990), although Madonna did not originate the styles she popularized, she helped bring them into the mainstream. Fashion scholar Harold Koda and Kal Ruttenstein of Bloomingdale's similarly argued in 2000 that she helped bring the garments into the "cultural consciousness" and that her influence "validate[d]" them. Cynthia Robins, a beauty writer for the San Francisco Chronicle, wrote in 2001 that her influence extended across the spectrum of "high, low or otherwise". Madonna influenced fashion or trends through her music videos, concert tours such as The Virgin Tour (1985) and Blond Ambition World Tour (1990), her roles in movies such as Who's That Girl (1987) and Evita (1996), and public appearances, including her use of gymwear.

Responses to Madonna's fashion trends varied. For instance, early in her career, an unusual number of young women began dressing like her—based on elements such as jelly bracelets, rosaries, crucifixes, lace tights—, giving rise to the term "Madonna wannabe". Macy's opened a "Madonnaland" department in 1985 to sell clothing inspired by her looks, and other retailers followed suit. Authors of the Defining Visions (1998) stated that "no pop star had more impact on retail clothing sales than Madonna", and Foley claimed Madonna to be "the woman who has influenced the fashion scene more than anyone else in the 1980s". Jane and Michael Stern (1992) wrote that her ascension coincided roughly with the Valley girl fad and that her wardrobe, "pretty much defined the Valley Girl look". In 2016, fashion magazine Redbook included Madonna's style among The Worst Fashion Trends of Every Decade, in the category of the 1980s. Madonna herself said in an interview with Rolling Stone that the 1980s included some of her worst fashion moments.

Observers such as Canadian scholar Karlene Faith (Madonna, Bawdy & Soul 1997), Gertrud Lehnert (A History of Fashion in the 20th Century, 2000), and Amalissa Hall from Tatler (2022) noted that her influence on fashion spanned decades or generations. The Journal of Popular Culture (1999) attributed Madonna's influence on fashion to her "capacity to identify with and interpret the moods". Fashion publications such as L'Officiel (2020), Harper's Bazaar (2015), Yahoo! Style (2021), and Vogue Italia (2023), credited her with helping to define fashion eras or looks that reemerged or endured. She was also credited with paving the way other celebrities through her style, or as an influence on them, by author Carlyn Beccia (2016) and publications such as Vogue and L'Officiel. Media entertainers Kelly Osbourne, Naomi Campbell, Rita Ora and Kelly Brook have cited Madonna as a fashion icon or influence.

=== Looks and outfits ===
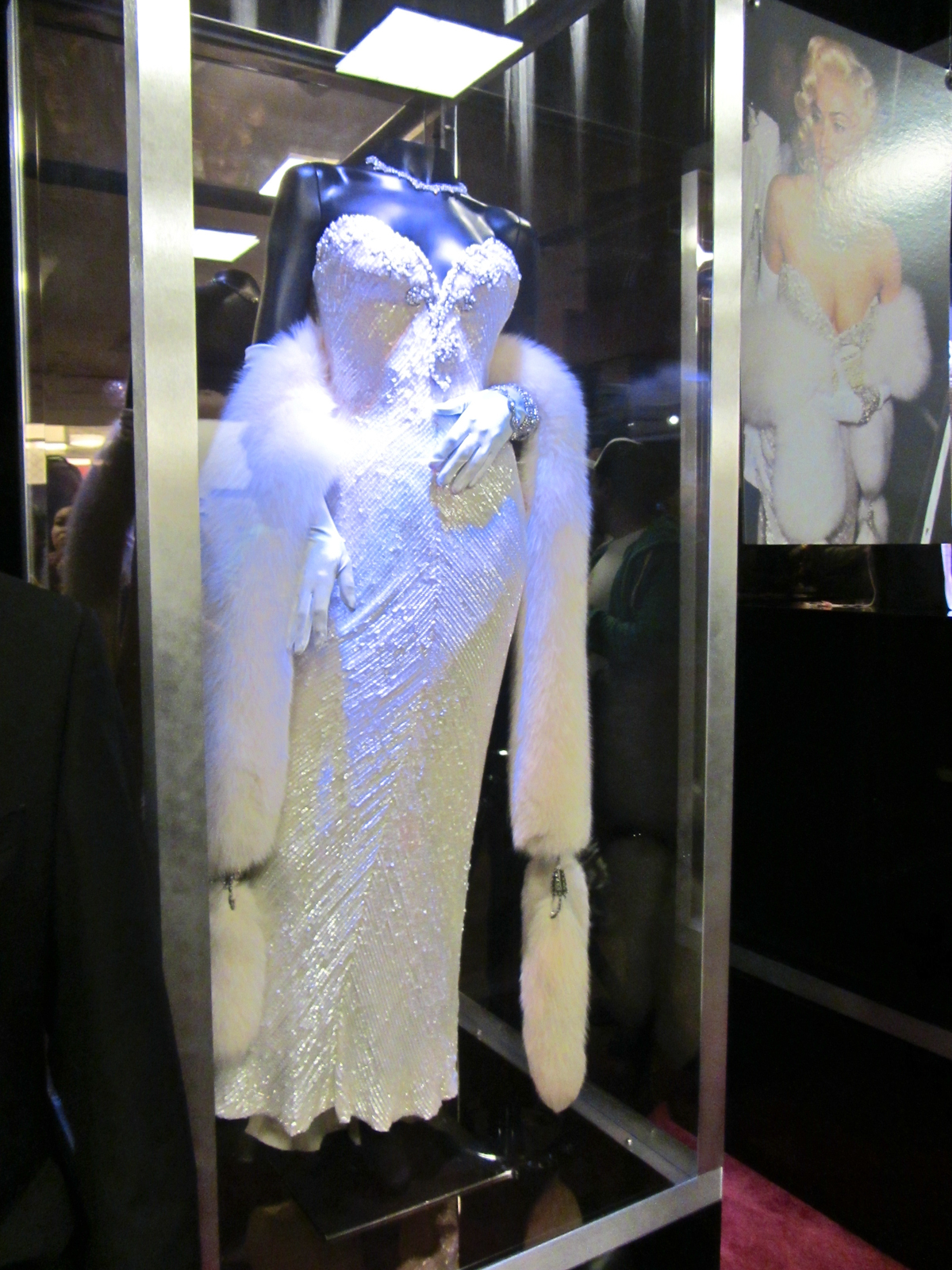
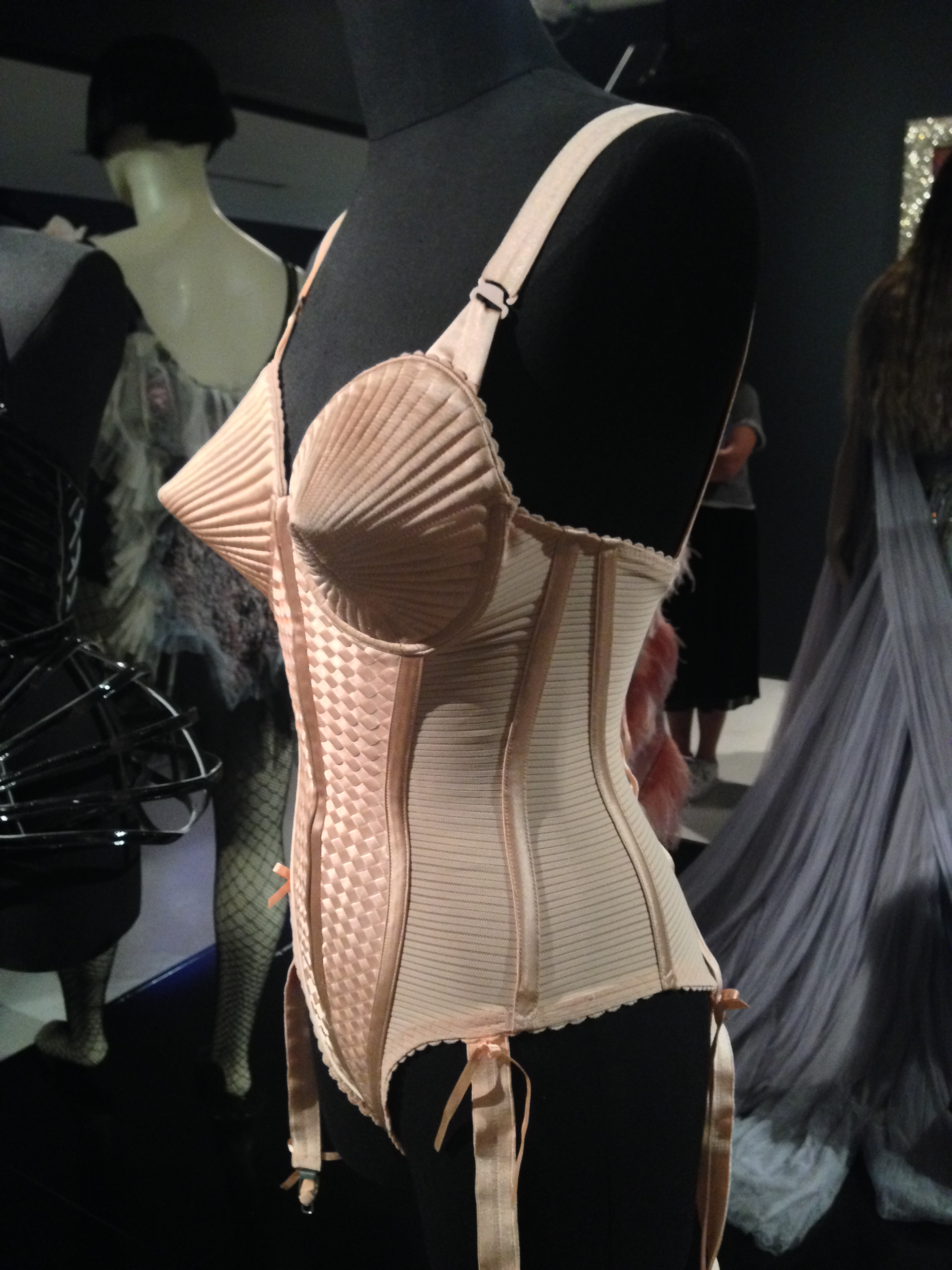
Madonna's white Bob Mackie dress, exhibited at Madonna's Fashion Evolutions (2013), and Jean Paul Gaultier pink-cone bra, featured in The Fashion World of Jean Paul Gaultier (2014)

The wedding dress Madonna wore during her 1984 MTV Video Music Awards performance was described by journalist Lyndsey Parker (2019) as a signature look of her career. Parker stated the general setting helped elevate her to superstardom, although it was also considered a highly controversial moment. Vogue's Spanish edition noted in 2015 that the look had become a Halloween costume. Her World (2019) credited the white Bob Mackie dress Madonna wore at the 1991 Academy Awards with influencing a generation of pop singers. The ponytail that Madonna wore in the Blond Ambition World Tour (1990) was described by Glamour as "one of the most iconic hairstyles of all time" and credited by Dazed with helping spark a fashion revival of the style.

The pink conical-bra corset designed by Jean-Paul Gaultier drew media attention. Critics called the look hypersexual and aggressive, and Entertainment Weekly (2015) named it a "controversial concert outfit". It became one of the many looks associated with her, according to the National Geographic Society. Fashion journalist Tim Blanks described the image of Madonna in the cone-bra as "one of the most unforgettable images" of the 1990s, and Another Magazine's Jack Moss described it as an image of pop-culture ubiquity. The style later influenced other designers and pop stars, according to publications such as Vogue (2022) and Entertainment Weekly (2020), and became one of her most emulated outfits, according to author Joanne Garde-Hansen (2011).

Clothing worn by Madonna has been displayed in museums and exhibitions, including the Metropolitan Museum of Art's Rock Style (1999–2000), the Victoria and Albert Museum's Kimono: Kyoto to Catwalk (2020), and Madonna, Manta, Mauerfall (2018), a German exhibition examining 1980s culture. In 2013, Madonna personally selected garments from her archive for Madonna's Fashion Evolutions, a pop-up exhibition at Macy's curated and styled by Arianne Phillips. During the premiere of her documentary film Madame X (2021), Madonna told Kim Kardashian that she had preserved many of her outfits and that her fashion archive was housed in Brooklyn.

=== Awards and rankings ===
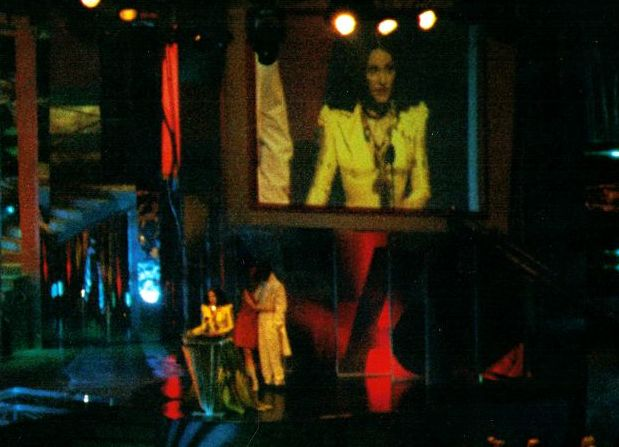
Madonna accepts an award at the VH1 Fashion Awards in 1998.

Madonna has appeared in media polls of both the best- and worst-dressed celebrities. She was included in both categories in Rolling Stone's 1985 annual poll, and topped both categories in Spin's first annual readers' poll in 1989, with the magazine referring to her as breaking down the "boundaries of good and bad taste". Fashion critic Richard Blackwell named Madonna the Worst Dressed in 1988, 1989, and 1992, describing her in the latter year as a "bare-bottomed bore of Babylon". He also included Madonna in his book Worst: 30 Years of Fashion Fiascos (1991). She was ranked among Vogue's 100 Best Dressed in 1999. In 2004, Madonna tied with American singer Cher for the most appearances on People's Hall of Fame of Worst Dressed, with seven each. In 2003, Czech publication Mladá fronta DNES called her "Master of Kitsch".

Madonna has also appeared on influence rankings. She topped the 1980s category in a 2009 Clothes Show London poll of the 20th century's greatest fashion icons, while Rolling Stone named her among the musicians who defined 1990s fashion. She was also included on lists published by Glamour (The 25 Most Influential Style Icons in Music, 2010), Time (All-TIME 100 Fashion Icons, Style and Design, 2012), Design Museum (Fifty Women's Fashion Icons that Changed the World, 2016), Laurence King Publishing (100 Women 100 Styles, 2021), and Harper's Bazaar's Women Who Changed Fashion: The Style Icons (2015) and 150 World's Most Fashionable Women (2017).

Madonna has also received awards for her fashion. She received the inaugural Versace Award at the VH1 Fashion Awards in 1998 and was named Style Icon at the Elle Style Awards in 2007. However, Madonna received the Worst Dressed Person Award at the Smash Hits Poll Winners Party of 1993 and 1994. In addition, she was included on the International Best Dressed Hall of Fame List, and inducted into the Headwear Hall of Fame in 2011.

== Activities and relationships ==
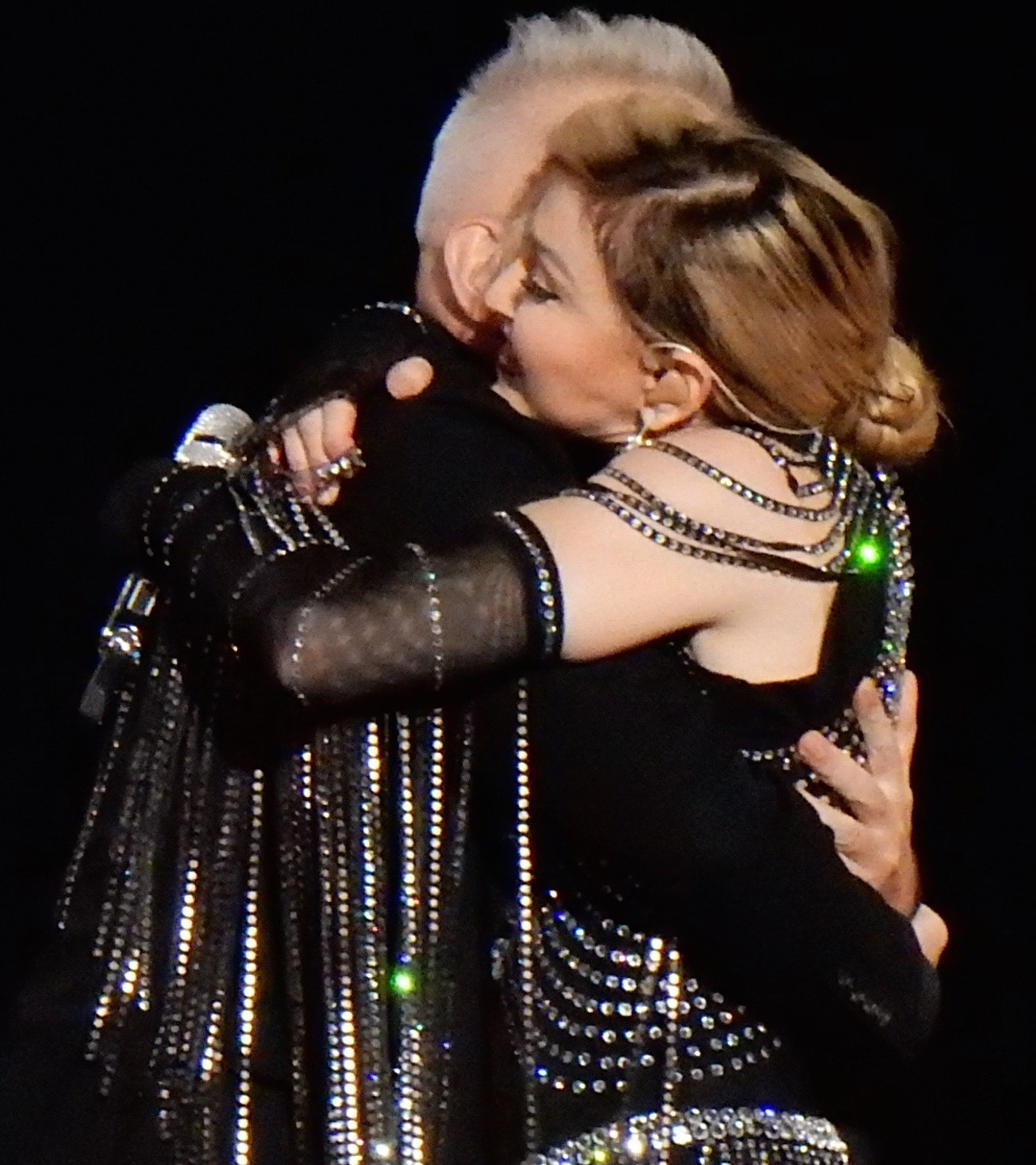
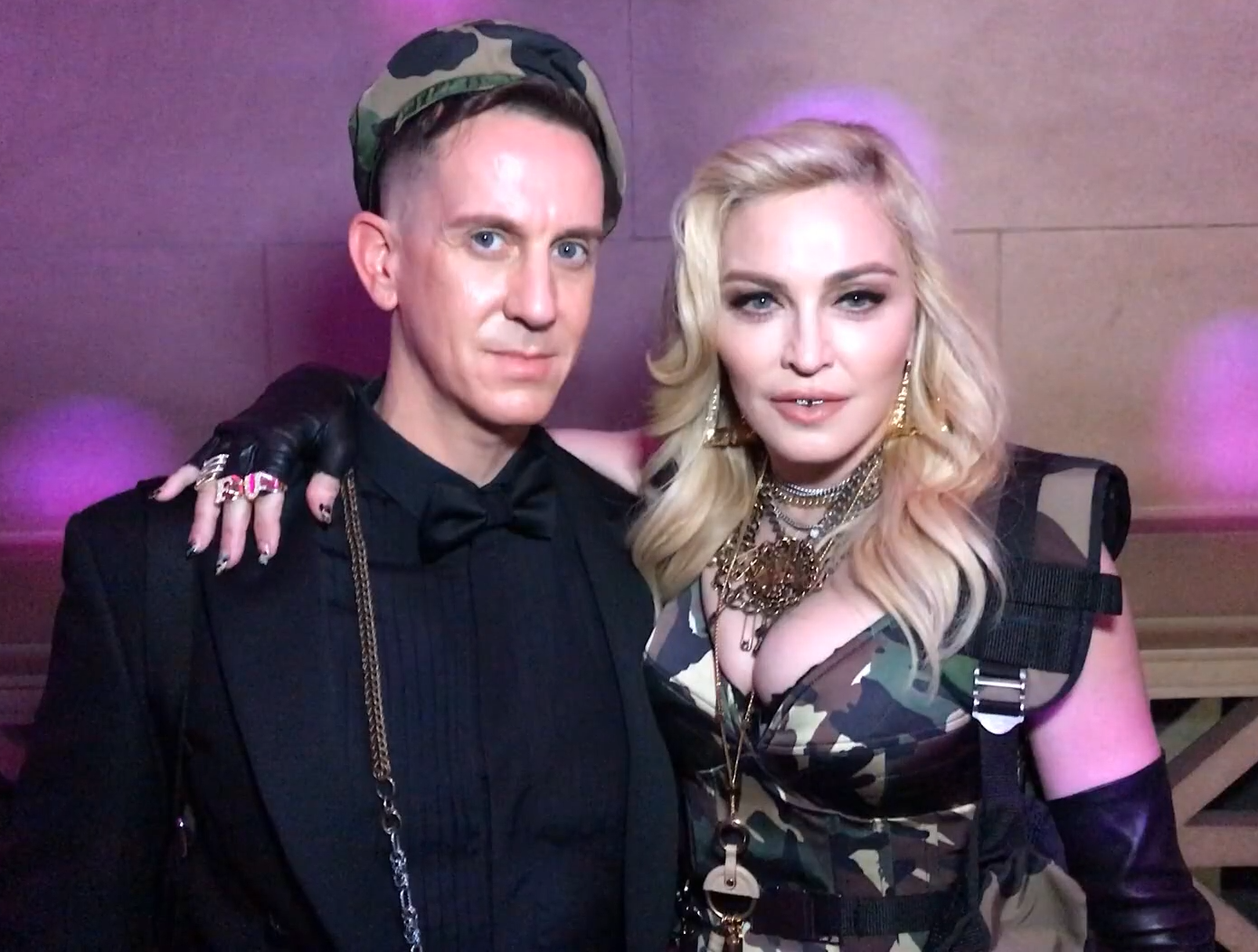
From left to right: Madonna with Jean-Paul Gaultier during the Rebel Heart Tour (2016) and with Jeremy Scott at the 2017 Met Gala.

Vogue (2021) described Madonna's relationship with the fashion industry as "symbiotic", describing her both a trendsetter and a muse to designers. American costume designer Arianne Phillips described this as a "unique relationship" in the early 2000s. She maintained long-term collaborations with designers such as Marlene Stewart, who worked with her from 1984 to 1992. Professor Martin S. Remland of West Chester University wrote that the emergence of MTV and Madonna made the relationship between music and fashion more prominent than before. The authors of Muckraker (2014) similarly saw Madonna as paving the way for a new way of understanding the relationship between fashion and show business. Madonna has attended several Met Galas with the first being in 1997. Liana Satenstein of Vogue (2018) credited her with having an impact on the runway and the red carpet.

=== Photography ===
Before fame, Popular Photography magazine noted that she worked as a nude model in art schools for photographers such as Martin Schreiber and Lee Friedlander. Photographic critic Vince Aletti (2000) wrote in American Photo that Madonna formed "rich creative relationships" with photographers such as Herb Ritts, Steven Meisel and Mario Testino, and actively participated in the process rather than simply posing for them. He also described photography as central to her rise to "iconic status" in The Guardian (1999).

Testino stated that he became known outside the fashion industry after working with Madonna, and credited that with her, he discovered his style. Madonna persuaded photographer Herb Ritts to direct his first music video, "Cherish" (1989). Photographers such as Ken Regan (Madonna: Into the Groove, 2026) and Richard Corman (Madonna NYC 83, 1983) have published photobooks of her. Photographs of Madonna have been exhibited at the National Portrait Gallery in London and the U.S. venue. Other photographers have also held exhibitions of their photographs of Madonna, including Corman with Madonna – A Transformational Exhibition (2013) held across W Hotels, and Japanese photographer Kenji Wakasugi with Madonna – 1985 (2022) in France. Fashion journalist Katie Grand noted frequent references to Madonna in the works of Mert and Marcus. In 2006, The British Journal of Photography described her as perhaps "the most photographed woman in the world".

==== Cover girl ====
Madonna on her first Vogue cover (May 1989)

American pop culture editor Matthew Rettenmund opined that Madonna took her covers "seriously", and she exploited the "model-like" look variegation according to David Desser and Garth Jowett in Hollywood Goes Shopping (2000).

Madonna has achieved several magazine-cover milestones, including being the first singer to appear on the covers of Vogue's The Big Four, a feat later matched only by Rihanna in 2021. Madonna has more appearances on the covers of Interview and Vanity Fair than any other person. She has the most cover appearances by an international female artist on the Spanish magazine Shangay (8), and she is the female artist with the most cover appearances on Rolling Stone, whether appearing alone or as part of a "collage" photoshoot, according to the magazine. She became the inaugural cover girl for the issues of Glamour's Women of the Year, of L'Officiel Ibiza (2021), and Vanity Fair's European "Icon" editions (2023). Madonna was the inaugural cover subject of publications such as Spin (1985), Greek magazine Pop Corn (1985) and Shock from Colombia (1995).

Madonna's debut on the cover of Vogue in 1989, under Anna Wintour's editorship, has been cited as an early example of the growing interest in celebrities on fashion magazine covers, at a time when models still dominated such publications (glossy and women's magazines). In 1999, Alex Kuczynski from The New York Times discussed the growing focus on celebrities, incorporating comments from Wintour and Allure's founder Linda Wells. Editor Ben Widdicombe (2021) stated that fashion magazines of that time "provide a uniquely quantifiable gauge for the rise of celebrity influence", arguing that "everything changed" when Madonna appeared on the covers of the American and British Vogue in 1989.

=== Collaborations and endorsements ===
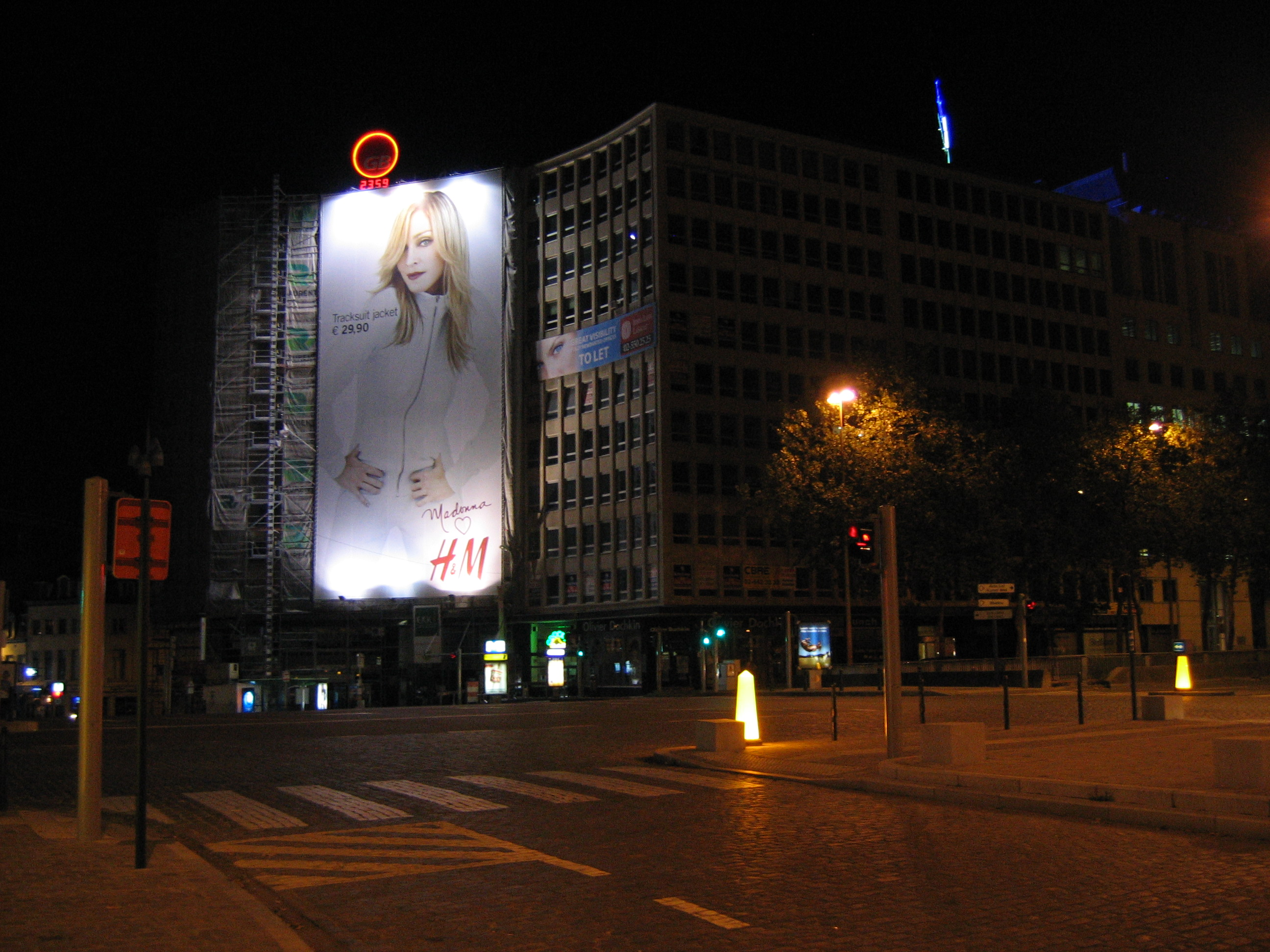
A billboard advertising Madonna's H&M clothing collection, M by Madonna, in Belgium (2007)

In the mid-1980s, fashion designer Maripol operated a boutique in New York City's East Village called "Maripolitan", which sold some officially licensed Madonna merchandise. The distribution was limited to the city. According to writer Mark Bego (2000), Madonna signed a merchandising agreement with the clothing manufacturer Entertainers Merchandise Management Corp. The company operated under the name Wazzo and distributed officially licensed Madonna clothing to department stores nationwide, including Bullock's and Merry-Go-Round stores in shopping malls. Madonna later launched her own fashion brands , as well as her first clothing collection, "M by Madonna" (2007), in association with H&M.

Madonna became the face of various campaigns, including a 1999 campaign for Max Factor, and appeared in campaigns for fashion brands such as Louis Vuitton and Versace. Madonna also participated in runway shows, including Jean-Paul Gaultier's 1992 amfAR runway, where her topless appearance generated controversy. She closed the Gaultier's 1995 spring collection wearing a slip dress and pushing an antique baby carriage from which she lifted a puppy. In 1992, Madonna participated in a Dolce & Gabbana runway show, which American fashion historian Valerie Steele viewed as publicizing their friendship.

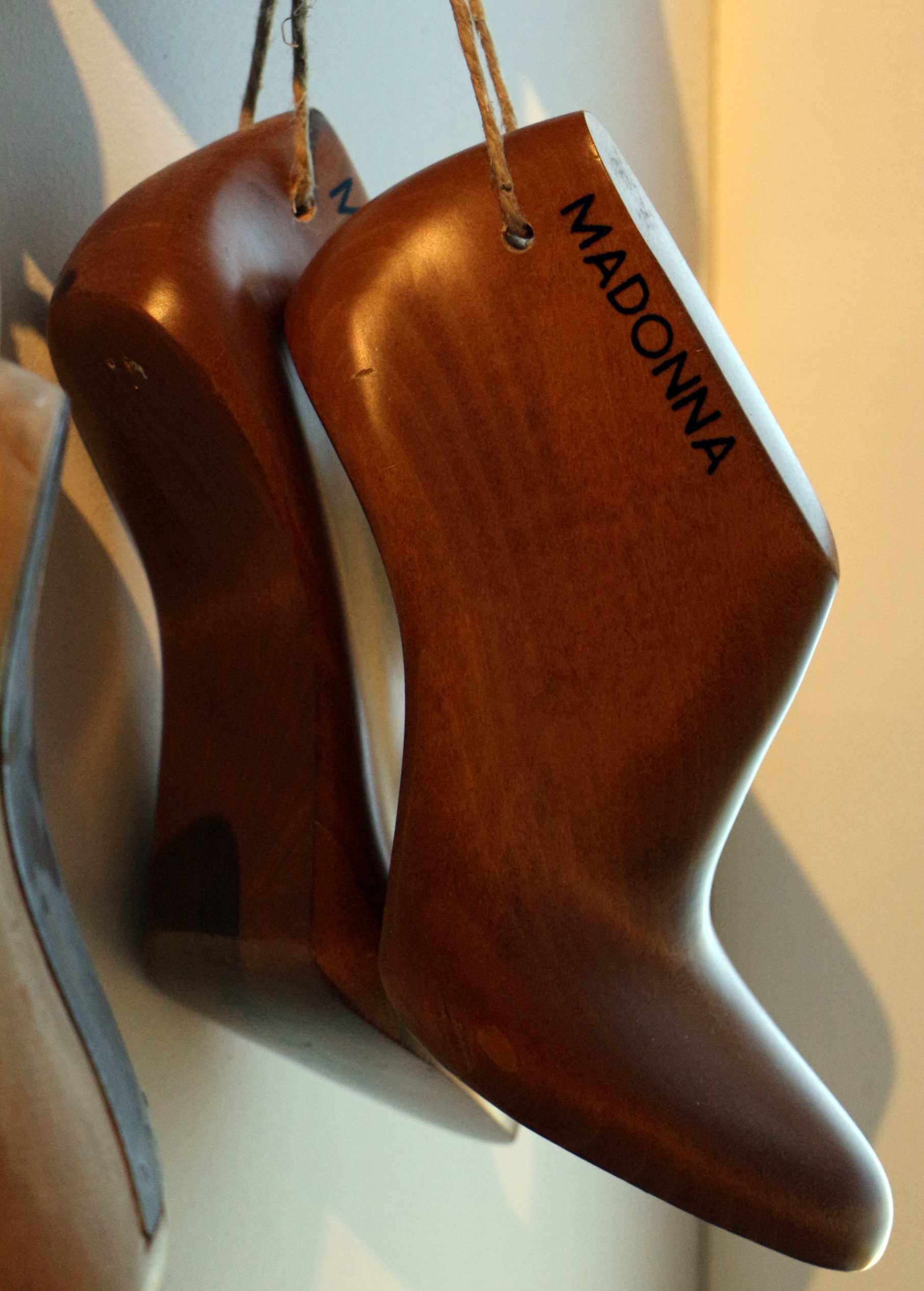
Madonna's footwear model at the Salvatore Ferragamo Museum

According to the author of The New York Book of Beauty (1995), the lipstick "Russian Red" was created by MAC Cosmetics for Madonna to wear during her Blond Ambition World Tour (1990). Joanne Gair called it the bespoke "MAC shade", and media outlets credited her with making it popular. Make Up For Ever and make-up artist Gina Brooke created the "Aqua Rogue/Iconic Red" (shade #8) for Madonna to wear on her MDNA Tour (2012). Laura Mercier created M, which Madonna used in the film Evita (1996), and gave permission to Mercier to market the shade as the "Madonna Lip Color", marking the first time she had allowed her name to be attached to a cosmetic product.

In Glamour: A History (2008), British cultural historian Stephen Gundle claimed that her collaborations with designers "inspired a whole series of developments in popular music and entertainment" and "new synergies occurred between different sectors". Madonna's patronage has been credited with helping to elevate both emerging and established designers by publications such as The Daily Telegraph (2018) and Mexican newspaper El Universal. American designer Arianne Phillips remarked that Madonna had "eclipsed my career" during an interview in 2011 with Daphne Merkin. Other publications and authors have noted that fashion houses and footwear brands benefited from the media attention generated by her, including Chloé, Dolce & Gabbana, Manolo Blahnik and Christian Louboutin. Her 1995 Versace campaign is also credited with generating significant press coverage for the brand, and according to author of House of Versace (2010), prompted Donatella to recruit one celebrity after another. Author Nikolay Anguelov similarly discussed the impact of Madonna's Versace campaign and the subsequent influence on the use of celebrities.

Madonna has influenced designers. The Journal of American Culture reported in 1999 that she influenced leading designers in Paris and London during the 1980s and 1990s, while later publications, including Women's Wear Daily (2023), Fashion Week Mexico (2015) and L'Officiel (2020) have continued to cite her as an influence. American fashion designer Anna Sui credited Madonna with inspiring her to stage her first runway show. German designer Michael Michalsky also cited Madonna as an inspiration. Designers have also paid tribute to her or dedicated shows to her, including Riccardo Tisci, Simon Doonan and Dolce & Gabbana. Donatella Versace was commissioned by L'Officiel to write an article about Madonna in 2019. In a 1985 interview, when Michael Gross asked Madonna how she felt about designers paying tribute to her, she replied that she was "flattered".

== Criticism and controversies ==
=== Background and reputation ===
The answer you may get the most, though? Her style. Madonna has consistently shocked — and often offended — audiences with her overtly sexual and revealing clothing choices.

— Static Media's TheList.com (2021)

Many of Madonna's looks have drawn controversy. She built a public reputation as a fashion provocateur, attracting criticism from the press and the public throughout her career for her fashion sense. Michael Rothman from ABC News (2016) stated that she is known for "risqué fashion statements", and Jacorey Moon of Yahoo Style! described Madonna in 2021 as known for creating fashion moments "full of controversial matter".

In 2016, Megan Friedman of Elle wrote that Madonna "spent decades wearing outrageous outfits and stoking controversy", and authors of Too Much (2020) described her as "perhaps the most famous example of a woman rigorously censured for dressing provocatively". In an op-ed for Australian website Startat60.com (2015), Dr Ely Lazar included Madonna's 2015 Grammy Awards outfit, which exposed her buttocks, among her examples of class and respect being replaced by "crude" self-indulgence and narcissism.

=== On Madonna's influence, sexuality and religion ===
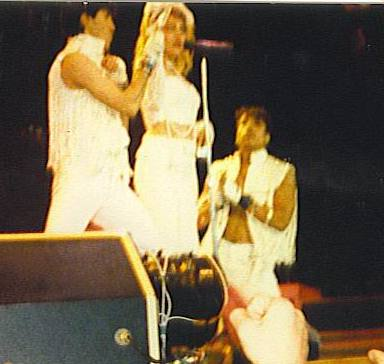
Madonna performing during The Virgin Tour in 1985, wearing crucifix earrings and necklaces, a style imitated by Madonna wannabes.

Madonna attracted concerns for the influence her fashion had, particularly on young people, early in her career. In Pop Goes the Decade: The Eighties (2017), author Thomas Harrison wrote that her approach to fashion had sexual overtones beginning with her 1983 videos "Borderline" and "Lucky Star". Biographer Mary Cross (2007) reported that she was accused of being a "source of moral contagion" to children and families.

In the 2000s, Rabbi Shmuley Boteach (2004) criticized the sexual overtones surrounding Madonna's fashion as well as "her ilk", citing the example of Girls Gone Wild videos, saying that they had spawned a "tragic world" among American adolescent girls. In Beauty and Misogyny: Harmful Cultural Practices in the West (2005), feminist scholar Sheila Jeffreys pointed out the perceived negative impact of Madonna, saying that "she has contributed significantly to normalizing prostitution and making it publicly acceptable to portray women as prostitutes in fashion and advertising generally". Jeffreys continued arguing that "the damage she wrought is that young girls' fashion is now more firmly attuned to servicing male sexuality. The prostitute or 'slut' look continues to be chic".

Madonna's use of religious imagery in her fashion often drew criticism. In 1985, minister Donald Wildmon called her "anti-Christian" and "antifamily" for wearing crucifixes as jewelry, while theologian Randall Smith of The Catholic Thing included Madonna among examples of the appropriation of religious imagery, referring to her as a rock star wearing a crucifix with "some sleazy outfit". Madonna generated controversy over her appearance and outfit when introducing Sam Smith and Kim Petras at the 2023 Grammy Awards. Madonna subsequently responded to reactions to her appearance. The controversy also concerned her introductory remarks and the subsequent performance by Smith and Petras, which Christian magazine World characterized as an "erotic ritual of devil worship".

=== Other aspects ===
Madonna's fashion has also attracted discussion and criticism in other areas. According to The Standard in 2012, Madonna had never publicly taken a position for or against fur, but had "enraged animal right activists" throughout her career. The Independent reported in 2006 that photographs of Madonna wearing a £35,000 chinchilla fur coat provoked a "storm of protest". She has faced criticism from PETA which named her the Worst-Dressed Celebrity of 2009. Madonna is described in the International Review for the Sociology of Sport (2003) as "inextricably tied to the fashion industry and consumer culture", while The Future Consumer (1994) described "Madonna's 'material' world" as one associated with consumers buying cosmetics, clothing, and "fun stuff".

Madonna's fashion has also been criticized in relation to cultural appropriation. In What's Happened To The University?: A Sociological Exploration of Its Infantilisation (2016), academic Frank Furedi wrote that popular entertainers such as Madonna have been "charged with causing cultural offence", and the authors of American Decades: 1980–1989 (1996) argued that she appropriated clothing associated with breakdancing and rap culture. Jamaican entertainer Grace Jones criticized A-list zeitgeist pop stars such as Madonna for copying her style in her memoir I'll Never Write My Memoirs (2015).

=== Photoshoots ===
Some of Madonna's photoshoots have generated controversy. Early in her career, nude photographs of Madonna taken in 1978, when she worked as a nude model before becoming famous, were published by Playboy and Penthouse, and caused public controversy. Some residents of her hometown of Bay City reacted negatively to such publications, and prompted the city to withdraw an offer to give her a key to the city. Her 1989 cover debut on Vogue was also considered controversial; Wintour said that Madonna was already regarded as a "highly controversial" figure by this point of her career, while Crespo added that her style was considered "tasteless" for a high-fashion magazine.

A 2021 cover shoot for V generated controversy, with both Madonna and the magazine receiving criticism, according to NME. The shoot drew on Marilyn Monroe's image and alluded to her death, while also taking inspiration from Bert Stern's The Last Sitting (1982). Some online users consequently described the imagery as "gross" and "insensitive". Madonna received further criticism after sharing the shoot's behind-the-scenes footage, in which photographer Steven Klein appeared to hold a knife to her throat, an image described as "violent" by NME and online users, and for the accompanying caption revealing that members of her team had been working "for free". In 2023, Madonna and Vanity Fair faced significant online backlash over a cover shoot for the magazine's February issue, in which Madonna was depicted as the Virgin Mary. Some accused the imagery of mocking Jesus. Writing for The European Conservative, Jan Bentz argued that the photoshoot pointed to what he described as "the darker occult roots of the entertainment industry".

== See also ==
- Love, Loss, and What I Wore
- List of people on the cover of Attitude magazine
- List of Elle (India) cover models
- List of people on the cover of GQ Russia
- Lists of Harper's Bazaar cover models
- List of people on the cover of i-D magazine
- List of Jane magazine cover models
- Lists of Playboy models
- Lists of covers of Time magazine
- List of TV Guide covers
- List of V magazine cover models
- Lists of people on the United States cover of Rolling Stone
- List of Vogue cover models

== Book sources ==
- Andrews, Marc (2022). Madonna Song by Song. Fonthill Media. ISBN 9781781558447.
- Anguelov, Nikolay (2015). The Dirty Side of the Garment Industry. CRC Press. ISBN 978-1498712231.
- Asitimbay, Diane (2005). What's Up America?: A Foreigner's Guide to Understanding Americans. Culturelink Press. ISBN 978-0-9759276-0-1.
- Ball, Deborah (2010). House of Versace. Crown Publishing Group. ISBN 978-0307462404.
- Batchelor, Bob; Stoddart, Scott (2007). The 1980s. Greenwood Publishing Group. ISBN 978-0313330001.
- Bego, Mark (2000). Madonna: Blonde Ambition. Cooper Square Press. ISBN 0815410514.
- Beccia, Carlyn Cerniglia (2016). Fashion Rebels: Style Icons Who Changed the World Through Fashion. Simon and Schuster. ISBN 978-1582704883.
- Blanco F, José; Hunt-Hurst, Patricia Kay; Lee, Heather Vaughan; Doering, Mary (2015). Clothing and Fashion: American Fashion from Head to Toe. ABC-CLIO. ISBN 978-1610693103.
- Blumenthal, Deborah (1995). The New York Book of Beauty. City & Company. ISBN 1885492235.
- Brown, Stephen (2004). Free Gift Inside!!: Forget the Customer. Develop Marketease. John Wiley & Sons. ISBN 1841126020.
- Calboli, Irene; Senftleben, Martin (2018). The Protection of Non-traditional Trademarks. Oxford University Press. ISBN 978-0198826576.
- Celnik, Jacobo (2018). La causa nacional: Historias del rock en Colombia (in Spanish). Penguin Random House. ISBN 978-9585425538.
- Church Gibson, Pamela (2013). Fashion and Celebrity Culture. Berg Publishers. ISBN 978-0857852311.
- Cochrane, Lauren (2016). Fifty Women's Fashion Icons that Changed the World: Design Museum Fifty. Hachette. ISBN 978-1840917475.
- Cote, Rachel Vorona (2020). Too Much: How Victorian Constraints Still Bind Women Today. Hachette. ISBN 978-1538729717.
- Clerk, Carol (2002), Madonnastyle, Omnibus Press, ISBN 0-7119-8874-9
- Cross, Mary (2007). Madonna: A Biography. Greenwood Publishing Group. ISBN 978-0-313-33811-3.
- Desser, David; Jowett, Garth (2000). Hollywood Goes Shopping. University of Minnesota Press. ISBN 0816635137.
- Dickinson, Kay (2003). Movie Music, the Film Reader. Routledge. ISBN 0415281598.
- Engelmeier, Regine; Engelmeier, Peter W.; Einzig, Barbara (1990). Fashion in Film. Prestel Publishing. ISBN 3-79-131100-X.
- Faith, Karlene; Wasserlein, Frances (1997). Madonna, Bawdy & Soul. University of Toronto Press. ISBN 0-802-04208-2.
- Feather, Frank (1994). The Future Consumer. Warwick Pub. ISBN 1895629284.
- Furedi, Frank (2016). What’s Happened To The University?: A Sociological Exploration of Its Infantilisation. Taylor & Francis. ISBN 978-1315449593.
- García, Leticia; Primo, Carlos (2014). El nuevo traje del emperador (in Spanish). Capitán Swing Libros. ISBN 978-8494287817.
- Garde-Hansen, Joanne (2011). Media and Memory. Edinburgh University Press. ISBN 978-0748688883.
- Gundle, Stephen (2008). Glamour: A History. Oxford University Press. ISBN 978-0199210985.
- Harrison, Thomas (2017). Pop Goes the Decade: The Eighties. ABC-CLIO. ISBN 978-1-440-83667-1.
- Jeffreys, Sheila (2005). Beauty and Misogyny: Harmful cultural practices in the West. Routledge. ISBN 9781848724471.
- Kaplan, E. Ann (2016). Rocking Around the Clock. Routledge. ISBN 978-1317227687.
- Kellner, Douglas; Hammer, Rhonda (2009). Media/cultural Studies: Critical Approaches. Peter Lang. ISBN 978-0-8204-9526-2.
- Khandelwal, Madhulika S. (2018). Becoming American, Being Indian: An Immigrant Community in New York City. Cornell University Press. ISBN 978-1501722028.
- Lehnert, Gertrud (2000). A History of Fashion in the 20th Century. Konemann. ISBN 978-3829020336.
- Marsh, Dave; Bernard, James (1994). New Book of Rock Lists. Simon and Schuster. ISBN 0671787004.
- Moeran, Brian (2016). The Magic of Fashion: Ritual, Commodity, Glamour. Routledge. ISBN 978-1315417967.
- Moore, Jennifer Grayer (2015). Fashion Fads Through American History: Fitting Clothes into Context. ABC-CLIO. ISBN 978-1610699020.
- Nowell, Iris (2004). Generation Deluxe: Consumerism and Philanthropy of the New Super-Rich. Dundurn Press. ISBN 155002972X.
- O'Neill, Michael (2014). The Best Bar Trivia Book Ever. Simon and Schuster. ISBN 978-1440579486.
- Partridge, Christopher (2017). The Bloomsbury Handbook of Religion and Popular Music. Bloomsbury Publishing. ISBN 978-1474237352.
- Remland, Martin S. (2016). Nonverbal Communication in Everyday Life. SAGE Publications. ISBN 978-1483370248.
- Schwichtenberg, Cathy (1993). The Madonna connection. Westview Press. ISBN 0813313961.
- Sexton, Adam (1993). Desperately Seeking Madonna: in search of the meaning of the world's most famous woman. ABC-CLIO. ISBN 0385306881.
- Smoke, Trudy (2005). A Writer's Workbook: A Writing Text with Readings. Cambridge University Press.
- Steele, Valerie (2015). The Berg Companion to Fashion. Bloomsbury Publishing. ISBN 978-1474264709.
- Stern, Jane; Stern, Michael (1992). Jane & Michael Stern's Encyclopedia of Pop Culture. HarperPerennial. ISBN 978-0060553432.
- Taraborrelli, J. Randy (September 27, 2001). Madonna: An Intimate Biography. Simon and Schuster. ISBN 978-0-7432-2880-0.
- Tzvetkova, Juliana (2017). Pop Culture in Europe. ABC-CLIO. ISBN 978-1-4408-4466-9.
- Watson, Mary Ann; Nash, Gerald D.; Etulain, Richard W. (1998). Defining Visions: Television and the American Experience Since 1945. Harcourt Brace College Publishers. ISBN 0-15-503201-1.
- Voller, Debbi (1999). Madonna: The Style Book. Omnibus Press. ISBN 0-7119-7511-6.
- Widdicombe, Ben (2021). Gatecrasher: How I Helped the Rich Become Famous and Ruin the World. Simon and Schuster. ISBN 978-1982128845.
