= Pyper America =

American model (born 1997)

- Born: Pyper America Smith; March 13, 1997 (age 29); Spanish Fork, Utah, U.S
- Occupations: Model; actress; musician
- Years active: 2015–present
- Spouse: Quaid Holder (m. 2019; div. 2023) Miles Whitworth (m. 2025)
- Relatives: Lucky Blue Smith (brother); Nara Smith (sister-in-law)
- Modeling information
- Height: 5 ft 9 1/2 in (1.77 m)
- Hair color: Blonde (naturally brunette)
- Eye color: Blue
- Agency: Fusion Models (New York); Margaux Models (Los Angeles)

Pyper America Whitworth (née Smith; born March 13, 1997) is an American model, actress, and musician.

== Early life ==
Pyper America was raised in Utah by a family who were members of the Church of Jesus Christ of Latter-day Saints. Her parents are Sheridan and Dallon Smith, a former model and a guitar string entrepreneur. Third of four children, her siblings are also models and musicians: two older sisters Cheyenne Starlie (born 1993), Daisy Clementine (born 1995), and a younger brother Lucky Blue (born 1998).

She also lived in Montana and California. At the age of 16, she moved with her family from Utah to Los Angeles, California, where she described experiencing culture shock.

== Career ==
On the runway she has walked for Giorgio Armani, Dolce & Gabbana, Cushnie et Ochs, Philipp Plein, Moschino, and Ermanno Scervino.

In advertisements, she has modeled for Moncler, Calvin Klein, and H&M alongside her siblings; as well as Forever 21 and Tiffany and Co.

She has appeared in the magazines L'Officiel, Vogue España, Seventeen, Vogue Ukraine, Allure, Love, W, and Elle among others.

With Superga, she designed a shoe line for spring 2017.

As a devout Latter-day Saint, she has chosen to not pose nude.

She is the bassist in an alternative rock band called The Atomics, formed with her siblings in 2015.

== Personal life ==
During 2016 and 2017, Pyper America dated Brandon Thomas Lee, son of Tommy Lee and Pamela Anderson.

In late 2017, she started dating Australian Quaid Rippon Holder. They got engaged on November 23, 2018. They got married in 2019 and divorced in 2023. She then married Miles Whitworth in 2025.
