= Tyrant (film) =

- Directed by: David Weil
- Written by: David Weil
- Story by: David Weil; Cody Behan
- Produced by: Charlize Theron; Alex Heineman; Andrew Rona; Beth Kono; A.J. Dix; David Weil; Natalie Laine Williams
- Starring: Charlize Theron; Julia Garner; Demi Moore; Michael Chiklis; Hudson Williams; Paapa Essiedu; Omar Apollo; Nara Smith
- Cinematography: Jeff Cronenweth
- Production companies: The Picture Company; Secret Menu
- Distributed by: Amazon MGM Studios
- Country: United States
- Language: English

Tyrant is an upcoming American thriller film written and directed by David Weil in his directorial debut. The film stars Charlize Theron (who also produces the film), Julia Garner, Demi Moore, Michael Chiklis, Paapa Essiedu, Hudson Williams, Omar Apollo, and Nara Smith.

== Cast ==
- Charlize Theron
- Julia Garner
- Demi Moore
- Michael Chiklis
- Hudson Williams
- Paapa Essiedu
- Omar Apollo
- Nara Smith

== Production ==
In August 2025, Amazon MGM Studios acquired the rights to David Weil's directorial debut Tyrant, which he also wrote and will produce.

In October 2025, Charlize Theron came on-board to produce and co-star in the film. In January 2026, Julia Garner joined the cast. In April 2026, Demi Moore was cast in the film.

Principal photography began on April 27, 2026, in Los Angeles, with Paapa Essiedu, Hudson Williams, Omar Apollo, Nara Smith, and Michael Chiklis joining the cast.
