= Heavy metal fashion =

Performer and fan worn attire as representing heavy metal music

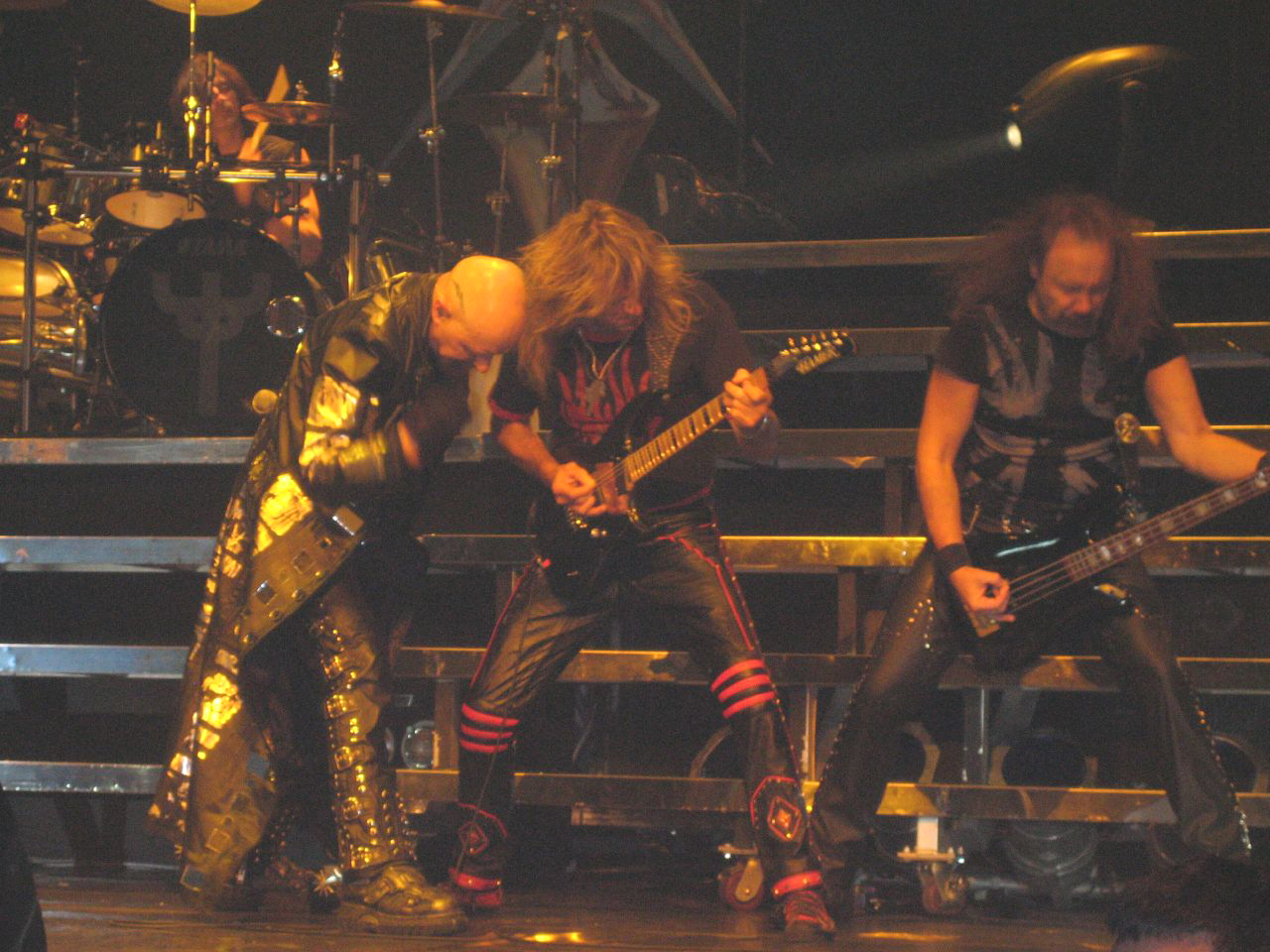
Judas Priest, in typical heavy metal stage attire, performing at the VH1 Rock Honors on May 25, 2006.

Heavy metal fashion is the style of dress, body modification, makeup, and hairstyles adopted by fans of heavy metal, known as metalheads. While the style has changed from the 1970s to the 2020s, key elements have remained constant, such as dark clothing, long hair and leather jackets. In the 1980s, some bands began wearing spandex. Other attire includes denim, leather vests, spiked wristbands, band T-shirts, and jackets with band patches. Fans of heavier subgenres of metal tend to wear bullet belts, gas masks, and other military paraphernalia.

== Origins ==
The clothing associated with heavy metal has its roots in the biker, rocker, hippie and leather subcultures. Heavy metal fashion also includes elements such as combat boots, studded belts, hi-top basketball shoes, black jeans, and camouflage bottoms. Particularly with bikers, there is a fascination with Germanic imagery, such as the Iron Cross.

Aspects of heavy metal fashion can be credited to various bands, but Judas Priest played a particularly influential role in shaping the style, primarily through its singer, Rob Halford. Halford wore a leather costume on stage as early as 1978 to coincide with the promotion of the Killing Machine (Hell Bent for Leather in the USA) album. In a 1998 interview, Halford described the leather subculture as the inspiration for this look. Halford may have been the one to popularize leather, but K.K. Downing wanted a look that suited the music they played. Downing started wearing studded leather outfits on stage and the rest of the band followed.

Other bands soon adopted the leather look. Iron Maiden's original singer Paul Di'Anno began wearing leather jackets and studded bracelets, Motörhead innovated with bullet belts, and Saxon introduced spandex. This fashion was particularly popular with followers of the New wave of British heavy metal (NWOBHM) movement in the early 1980s, and sparked a revival of metal in this era. The studded leather look was extended in subsequent variations to include combat boots, studded belts, bracelets, and bullet belts.

== Other influences ==
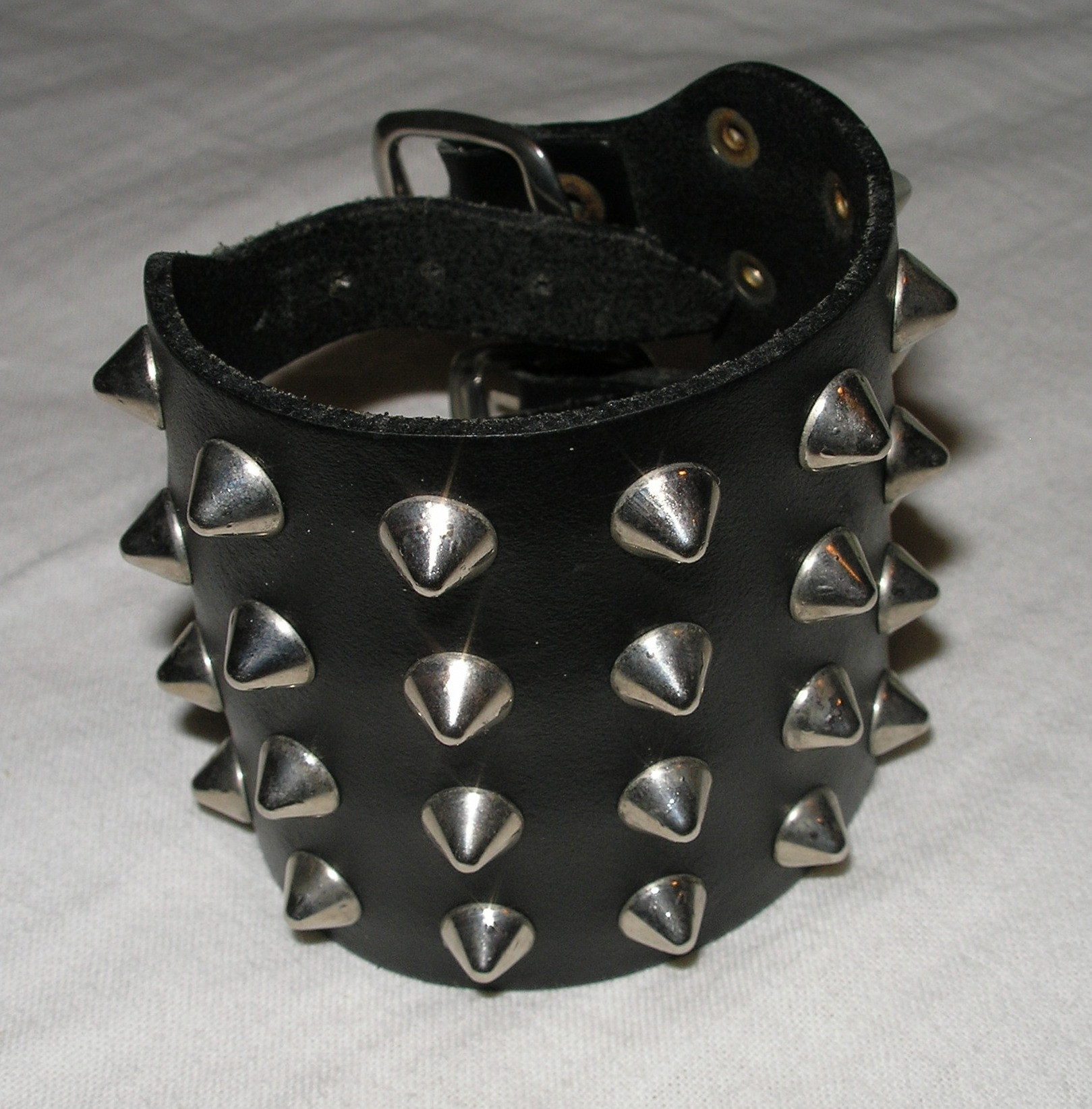
Spike "bands" or gauntlets are a common element among fans.

Influences from military clothing and the Vietnam War can be seen by fans and bands of thrash metal, with members of thrash metal bands of the 1980s like Metallica, Destruction, and Megadeth wearing bullet belts around their waists on stage.This style is often connected to punk-metal and anti-fashion, similar to the hardcore punk scene, as the aforementioned style reflects similar attitudes. Ex-lead singer of German heavy metal band Accept, Udo Dirkschneider, also contributed to the military clothing aesthetic by wearing military pants starting in 1982, popularizing the military aesthetic.

Fans of glam metal often have long teased hair and are dressed in spandex pants and leather jackets. They may also use makeup (lipsticks, eye shadows, tonal creams, etc.). Bands that play in the glam metal genre may have instruments with extravagant colors and attributes like guitars with pink, violet, or Dalmatian print. Microphone stands with a leopard-print or silk scarves are also common, drum sets with some artwork (this kind of drum set is seen in other metal genres as well, not only in glam metal).

The imagery and values of historic Celtic, Saxon, Viking and Chivalric culture are reflected heavily in metal music by bands such as Blind Guardian, and have an impact on the fashion and stage gear of metal artists. The independence, masculinity and honor of the warrior ethos are popular amongst metalheads, as is the rejection of modern-day consumerist and metrosexual culture. Folk metal, Viking metal, black metal and power metal fans often grow long, thick hair and beards reminiscent of a stereotypical Viking, and wear Thor's Hammer pendants and other pagan symbols. On stage, in photo shoots, and in music videos, it is common for bands of these genres, such as Turisas and Moonsorrow, to wear chain mail, animal skins, war paint (such as woad) and other Dark Ages-themed battle gear.

Corpse paint is another style of black-and-white makeup, used mainly by black metal bands to give the appearance of being dead. It is often composed of a white layer covering a person's face with black details on top, often in the shape of crosses or around the eyes. Bands such as Cradle of Filth and Kiss have stated that this was born as a homage to early silent black-and-white horror movies.

Power metal fans and musicians such as Rhapsody of Fire often wear attire reminiscent of the Renaissance and the Middle Ages, including tight leather trousers and wide-sleeved buttonless shirts. The imagery of bards and minstrels, as well as knights, is a popular part of power metal fashion.

Some stoner metal bands and fans have incorporated retro looks — boot-cut or bell-bottom jeans, headbands, and tie-dye or other colorful shirts inspired by 1960s and 1970s psychedelic rock as well as cannabis culture.

Nu metal fashion includes baggy pants or cargo shorts (borrowing from hip hop culture), spiked hair or dreadlocks, and an abundance of accessories.

Bands such as Akercocke, The Vision Bleak, Lacrimosa, Motionless in White, Fleshgod Apocalypse, and Northern Kings are known for the use of formal clothing in music videos and stage performances, sometimes imitated by fans.

== See also ==
- Music and fashion
