= Music and fashion =

Aspect of popular culture

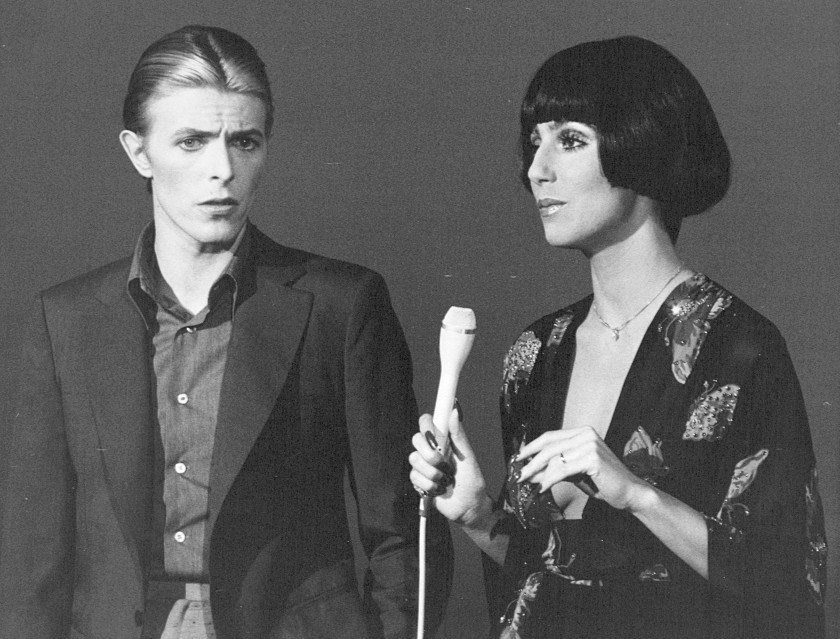
David Bowie and Cher in 1975.

Music and fashion have long been closely linked. Musical identities are portrayed in their style of fashion. Artistic movements in music have often been associated with distinct fashions. Many famous musicians have also had notable styles and influenced fashion. Many fans recreate the looks of their favorite musicians to show affiliation with a specific genre of music. The way an artist and their fans portray themselves through fashion often reflects a shared group identity of cultural or political values. By imitating an artist's style, fans are able to push a musician's individual style into mainstream fashion, which forms a visual representation of individual genres of music. Designers will then draw influence from these fashion microtrends in musical subcultures for their new collections. This cycle of codependence forms a strong relationship between the music and fashion industry.

== Musicians and Industry ==
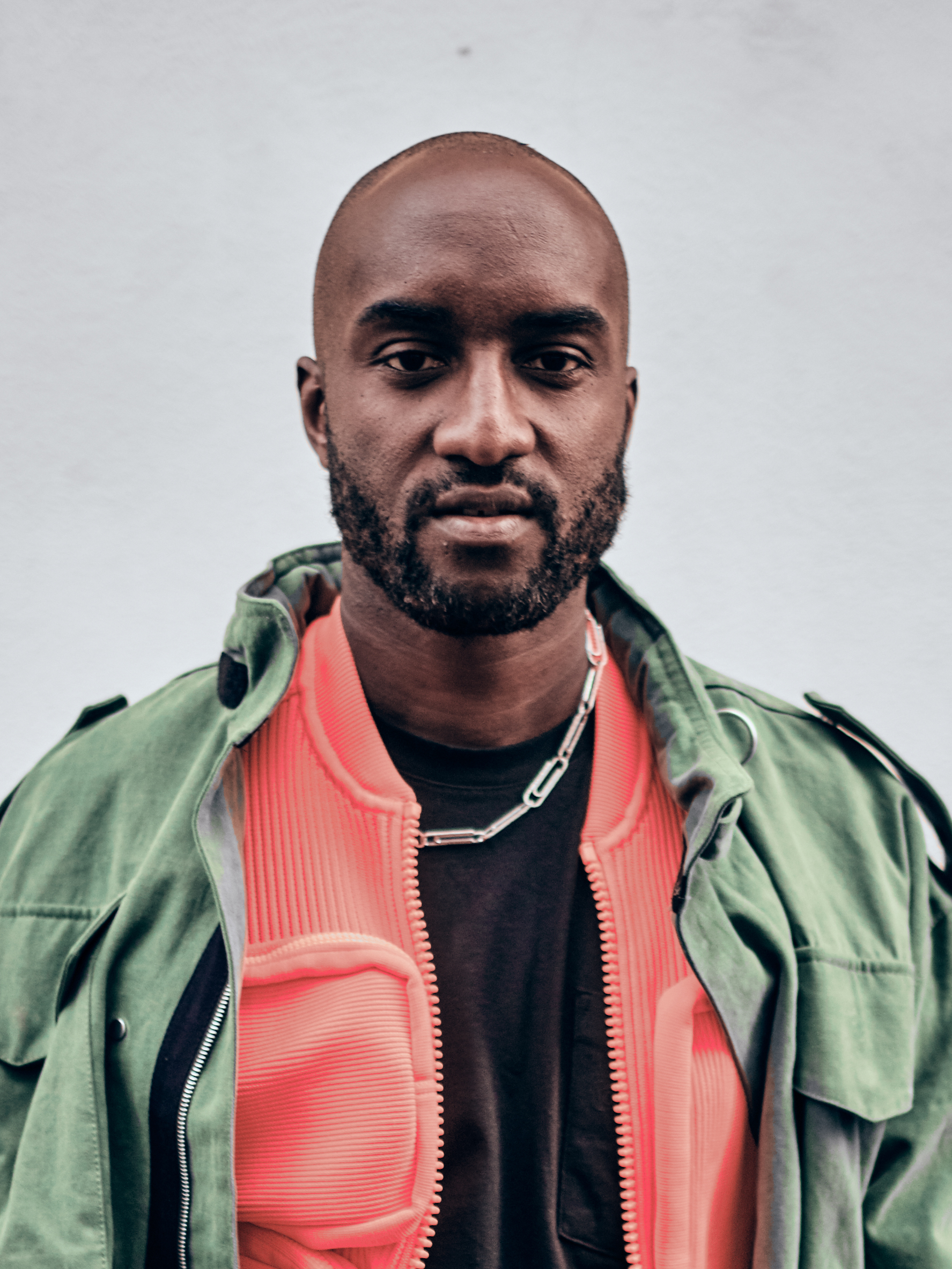
Virgil Abloh at Paris Fashion Week Autumn/Winter 2019.

Some musicans choose to directly participate in the fashion industry through designing, creative directing, and modeling. The past artistic director of the luxury brand Louis Vuitton's menswear, Virgil Abloh, used to be a DJ and producer, and Vogue described music as being a central influence to his creativity. In his debut Louis Vuitton show, many musicians modeled pieces from his collection and walked the runway, including rapper Playboi Carti, Kid Cudi, and Steve Lacy. Through this opportunity, the musicians were able to be a part of a highly regarded fashion show and an important part of Abloh's career. The show ended with an emotional moment between Abloh and his friend and collaborator, Kanye West. Vogue described Abloh as having a mutual relationship with his musician collaborators.

Kanye West is another example of a musician actively participating in fashion by working with luxury brands and even designing his own line of clothing. However, unlike Abloh, Kanye West started his fashion journey while he was already a well-established musician. Kanye worked with Louis Vuitton as well, and he designed a shoe line showcased at Paris Fashion Week in 2009.. Later that year, he worked with Fendi to develop their menswear. After that, he released his own clothing brand called Yeezy. West also combined his fashion and music life when he created limited-edition scarves with designs inspired by his 2010 album My Beautiful Dark Twisted Fantasy. He even named himself the "Louis Vuitton Don" in a song lyric in his famous album The College Dropout. Music and fashion have always been interlinked for West, and in his research paper, Armitage argues that West's fashion projects make up a big piece of his recognizable persona.

== Pop ==
The Boston Globe described singers Cher and David Bowie as pioneers of shape-shifting in pop music. Cher emerged as a fashion trendsetter in the 1960s, popularizing "hippie fashion with bell-bottoms, bandanas and Cherokee-inspired tunics". She has repeatedly reinvented herself by adopting a series of visual personas, for which Richard Aquila called her "the ultimate pop chameleon". Billboard observed Cher's role in redefining visual possibilities for pop stars, allowing them to adopt multiple personas on and off stage. The Independent's Alexander Fury traced Cher's fashion influence among female music artists such as Beyoncé and Jennifer Lopez, stating, "They all graduated from the Cher school of never sharing the stage, with anyone or anything."

New York magazine acknowledged Barbra Streisand's fashion sense, saying "she embarked on a surreal, chameleonic, personal fashion quest" that single-handedly began the retro revolution in the 1960s. American singer Michael Jackson inspired global fashion trends during the 1980s. British Vogue called him "a fashion pioneer [who] initiated the trophy jacket trend in the Eighties". His style included sequined gloves, a fedora, red leather jackets, sequined jackets, aviator sunglasses, black high-waisted pants, white socks and leather penny loafers. American singer Madonna is known for having adopted multiple visual styles throughout her career. Author James Robert Parish wrote that her fashion during the 1980s helped create a new version of the blonde bombshell image. Scholar Camille Paglia wrote, "[Madonna] has become a fashion icon more than a music pioneer". Madonna's prominence enabled her to bring subcultural styles into the mainstream. Various publications have credited Madonna with starting the underwear as outerwear trend.

== Country ==
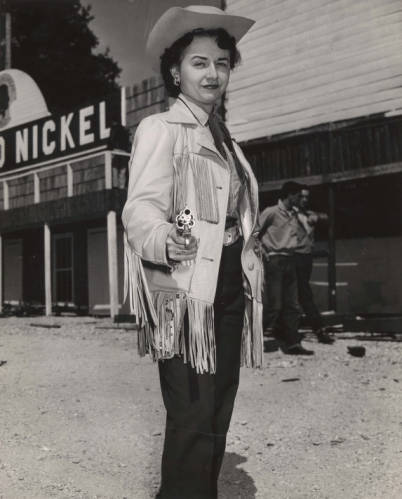
Woman wearing fringe jacket and hat, United States, 1953

Western wear is a category of men's and women's clothing which derives its unique style from the clothes worn in the 19th century Wild West. It ranges from accurate historical reproductions of American frontier clothing to the stylized garments popularized by Western film and television or singing cowboys such as Gene Autry and Roy Rogers in the 1940s and 1950s. It continues to be a prominent style in the West and Southwestern United States, as well as among people associated with country music or Western lifestyles, for example the various Western or Regional Mexican styles. Western wear typically incorporates one or more of the following: Western shirts with pearl snap fasteners and vaquero design accents, blue jeans, cowboy hat, a leather belt, and cowboy boots.

== Grunge ==
Grunge fashion refers to the clothing, accessories and hairstyles of the grunge music genre. This subculture emerged in mid-1980s Seattle, and had reached wide popularity by the mid 1990s. Grunge fashion is characterized by durable or hardy thrift store clothing, often worn in a loose, androgynous manner to de-emphasize the silhouette. The style was popularized by music bands Alice in Chains, Nirvana, Soundgarden and Pearl Jam.

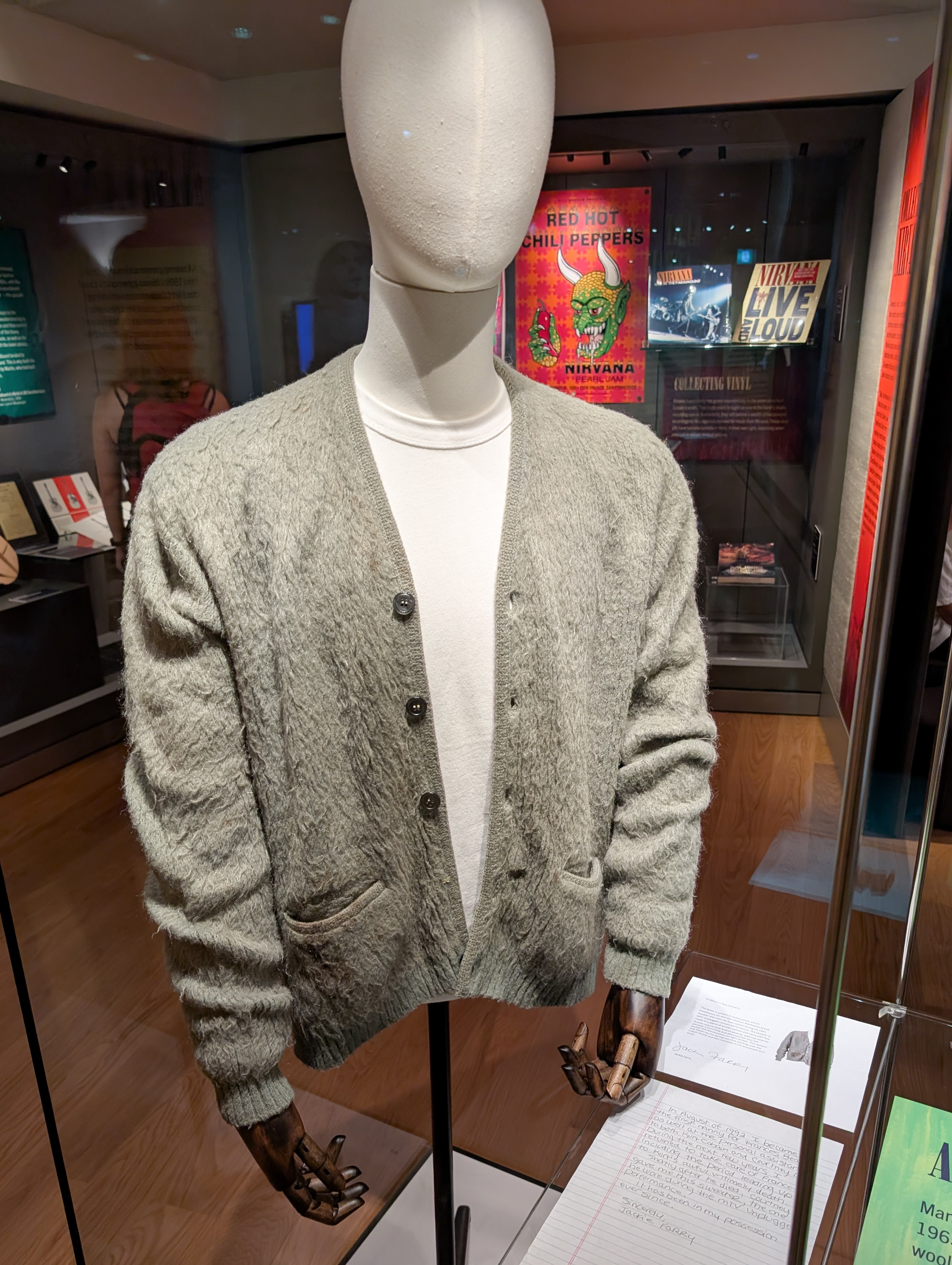
Kurt Cobain's cardigan from MTV Unplugged, Royal College of Music Museum, London.

Grunge fashion consisted of a mix of second-hand clothing, workwear, and punk-style pieces. It commonly pieces like flannels, graphic T-shirts, layers of thermals, thrashed jeans, and combat boots. The list goes on, but it was mainly inspired by the style of garage bands in Seattle in the 1980s, which maintained an unkempt appearance that portrayed the music's raw sound and rejected polished aesthetics of the 1980s. In addition, the style was also developed through thrift stores that offered cheap, durable workwear clothes as well as flannel, wool, and boots to fit the climate of the region. Flannel and wool specifically held a connection to logging and other outdoor work. Grunge fashion was not tied to a specific gender, and all people shared similar pieces and styles. Kurt Cobain is a famous example of the androgyny within grunge style and he iconicly wore dresses with makeup and workwear.

In the early 1990s, grunge fashion started to enter mainstream fashion media and collections. Magazines started to feature photos with the grunge aesthetic, and in 1993, Marc Jacobs incorporated the style into his Perry Ellis fashion collection. Other designers followed suit and started producing classic grunge flannels, oversized cardigans, and military-style boots. Different versions of the style would be produced, but the look always kept its raw, unkempt style.

== Heavy metal ==
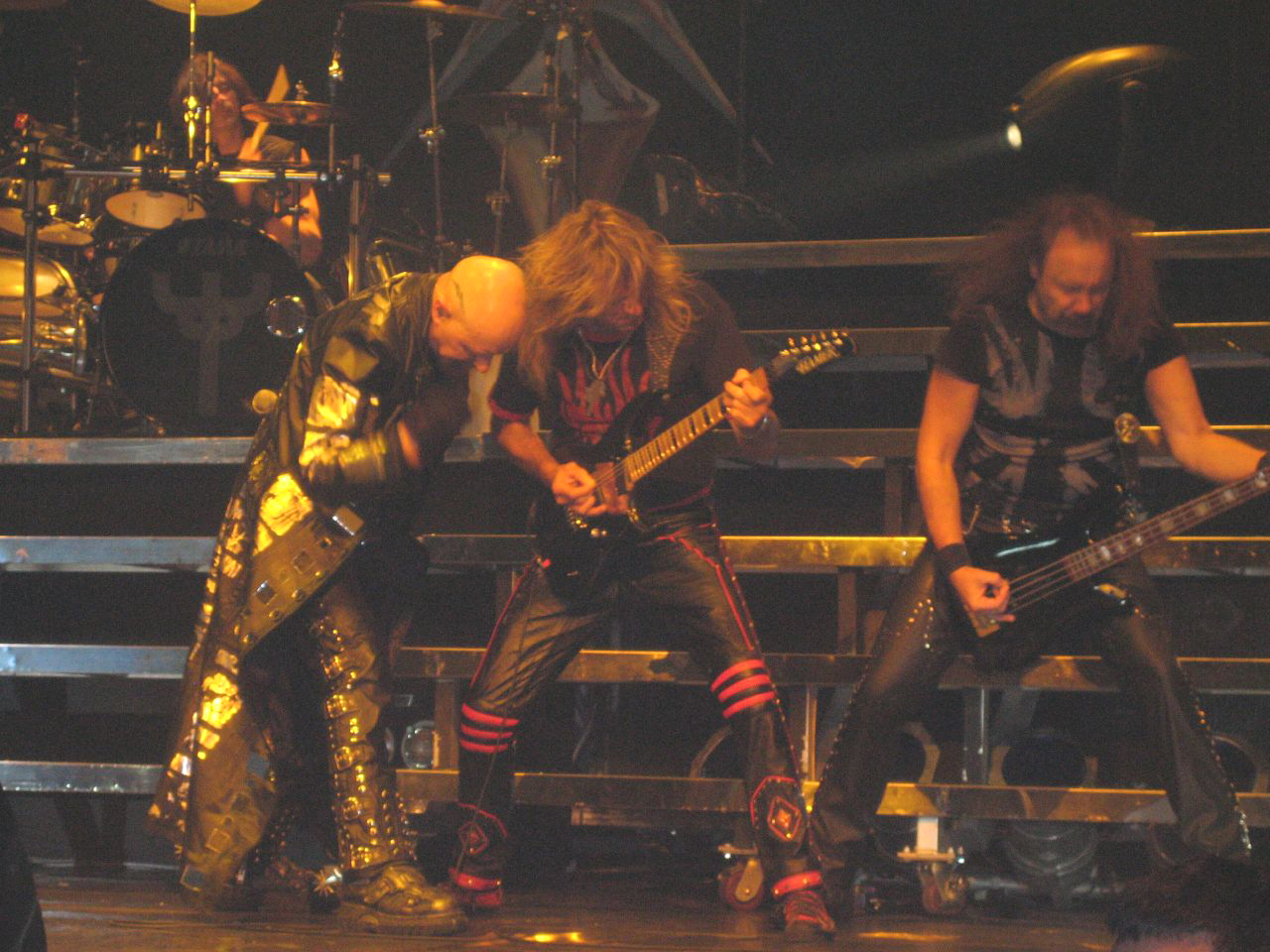
Judas Priest, in typical heavy metal stage attire, performing at the VH1 Rock Honors on May 25, 2006.

Heavy metal fashion is the style of dress, body modification, makeup, and hairstyles adopted by fans of heavy metal, known as metalheads. While the style has changed from the 1970s to the 2020s, key elements have remained constant, such as dark clothing, long hair and leather jackets. In the 1980s, some bands began wearing spandex. Other attire includes denim, leather vests, spiked wristbands, band T-shirts, and jackets with band patches. Fans of heavier subgenres of metal tend to wear bullet belts, gas masks, and other military paraphernalia.

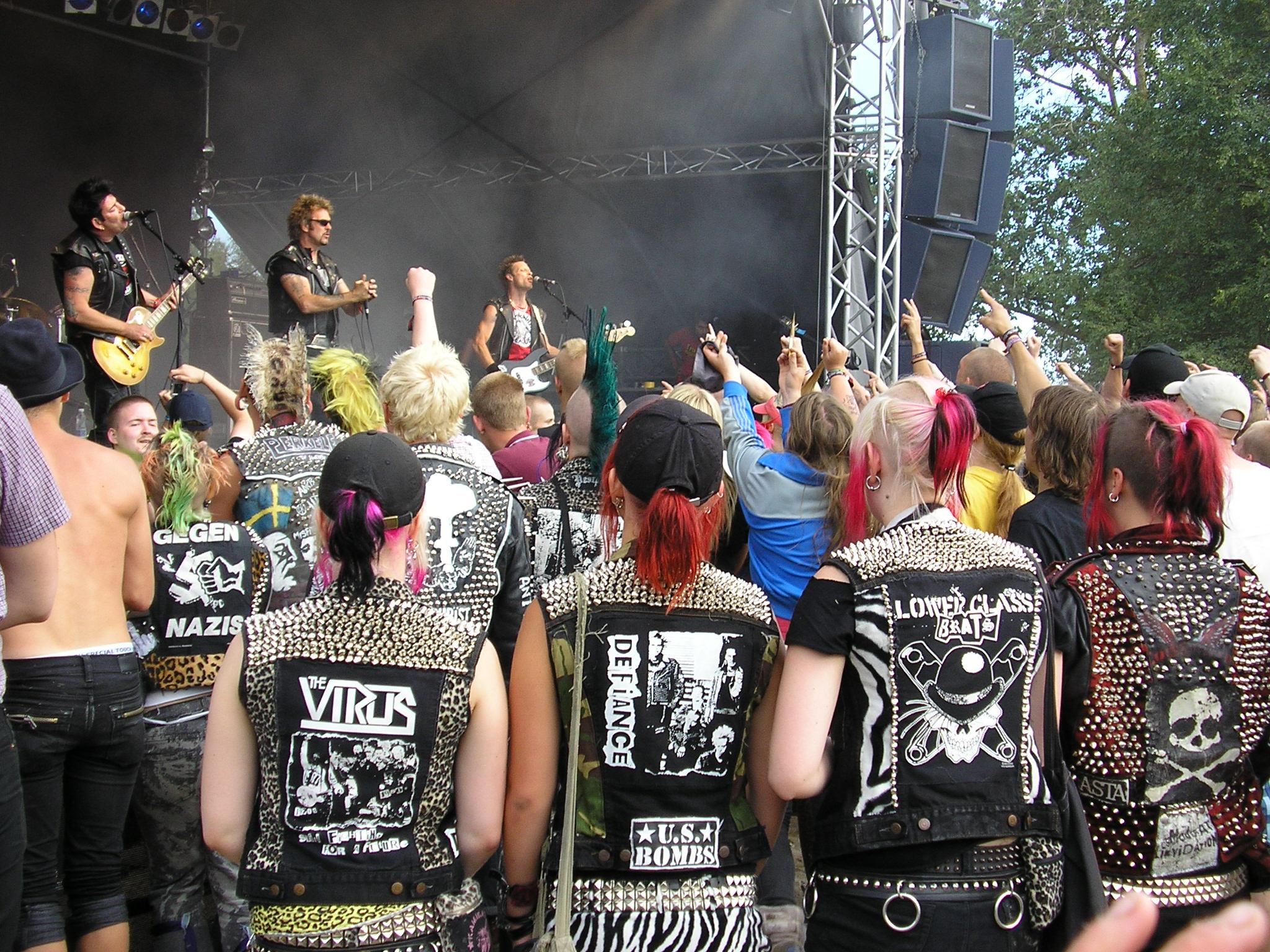
An example of fans wearing battle jackets at Augustibuller 2007.

In the mid-1970s, battle jackets became a very popular piece to wear in the metal community. These were usually sleeveless denim or leather jackets decorated with band patches. It was heavily influenced by biker culture, where customized jackets were used to affiliate with specific motorcycle clubs, geographic territory, and rank. When patches started to sell at concerts, these jackets rose in popularity in the metal community, and in the 1980s, they were commonly called "battle jackets." Patches became a record of attending a specific performance and connected to the individual's personal style. Many wearers of battle jackets saw their jacket as a reflection of themselves and customized them in detail. Evidence of wear in the jacket, like rips, dirt, and stains, was often seen as credibility in the metal community. It demonstrated participation in live concerts and an association with the metal community. The more natural wear and tear, the more commitment it showed to the heavy metal culture.

== Hip-hop ==
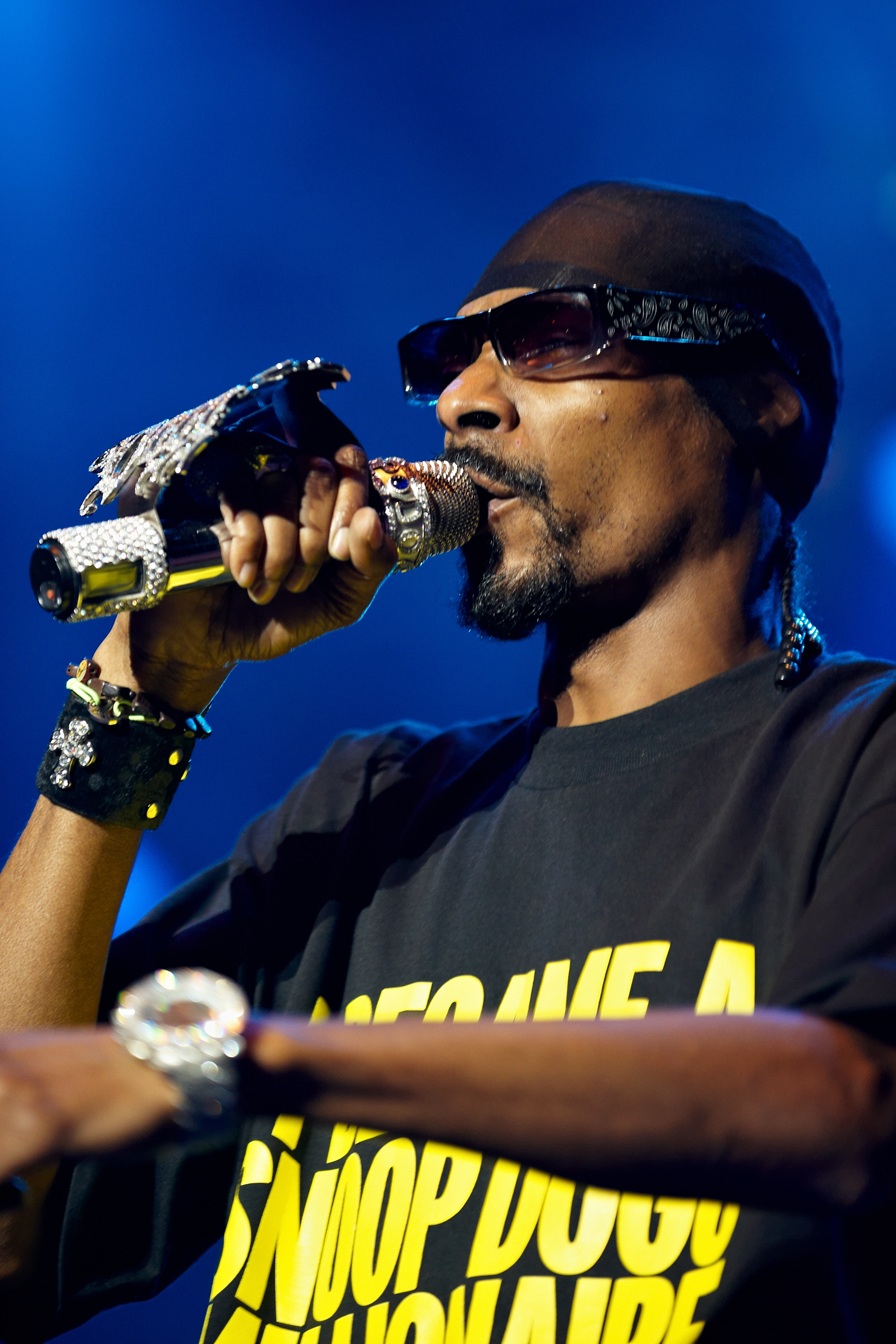
Rapper Snoop Dogg in 2009 show overalls

Hip-hop fashion (also known as rap fashion) refers to the various styles of dress that originated from Urban Black America and inner city youth in American cities like New York City, Los Angeles, and Atlanta. Being a major part of hip-hop culture, it further developed in other cities across the United States, with each contributing different elements to the overall style that is now recognized worldwide.

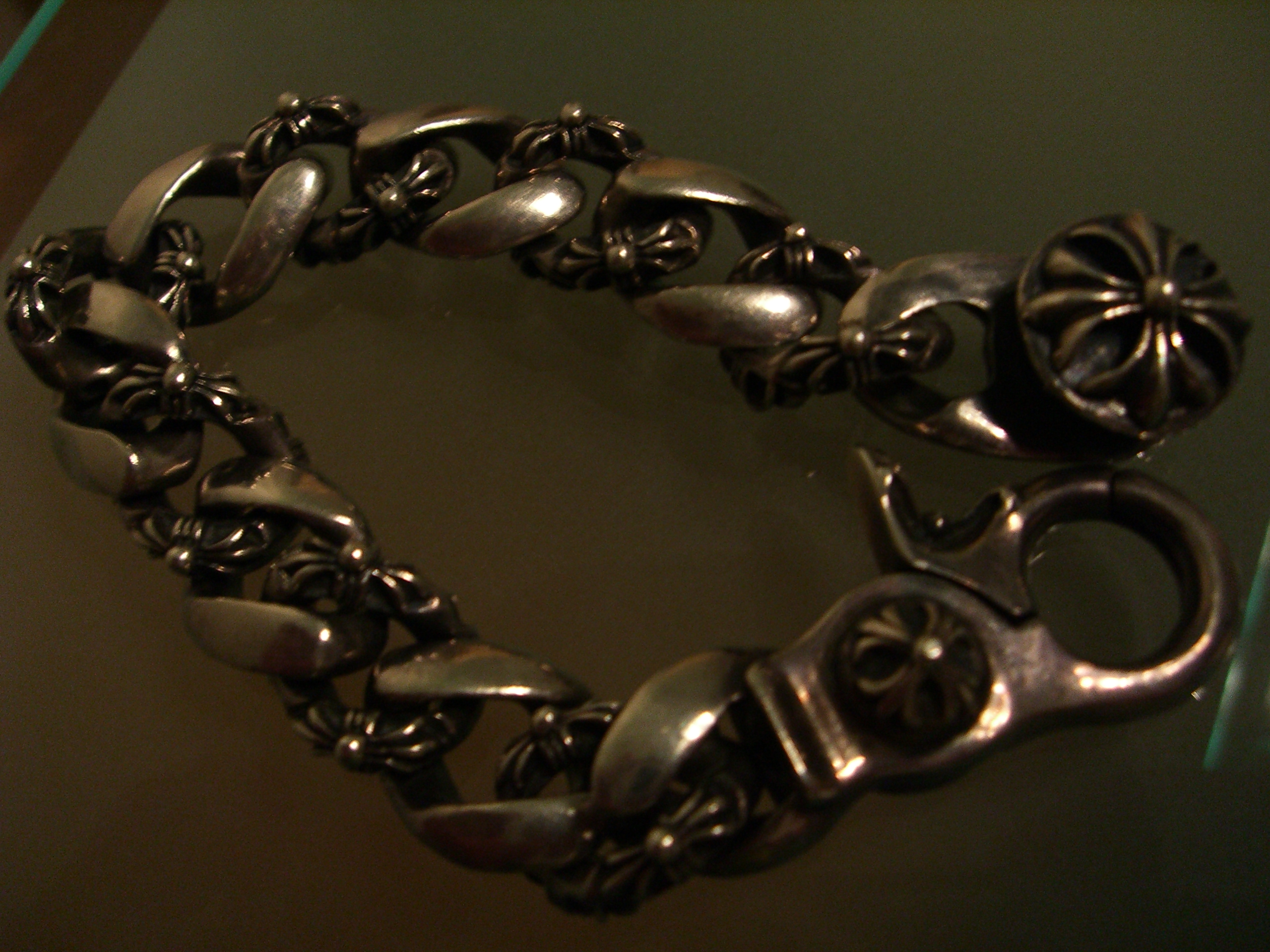
Example of a sterling silver Chrome Hearts bracelet from 2006.

Hip-Hop has also pushed luxury brands that have roots in other music subcultures into the limelight. Chrome Hearts is a luxury brand founded in Los Angeles in 1988 by Richard and Laurie Lynn Stark that had a resurgence in popularity with its presence in hip-hop in the 2020s. The brand's initial garments included leather clothing, jewelry, and accessories for bikers and rock musicians. Early Chrome Hearts designs consisted of thick leather pieces, sterling-silver hardware, crosses, and motorcycle-style aesthetics, which established its image as a gothic biker style. However, it was introduced to the younger generation of mainstream hip-hop by the son of the founders, Kristian Stark. He put Chrome Hearts on rappers like Young Thug and Lil Uzi Vert, similar to how his parents reached out to rock groups like the Sex Pistols and Gunz N' Roses during the early days of the brand. As described in GQ's 2024 Chrome Hearts profile, the Chrome Hearts image transferred from rock stars to pop stars to hip-hop artists and became the epitomy of "flexing". It is very common to see hip-hop artists like Drake, Offset, and Travis Scott fully outfitted in the classic Chrome Hearts crosses across their jeans and carpenter pants. Although Chrome Hearts is just one brand, it is an example of the strong relationship between luxury fashion and hip-hop.

== Mod ==
Mod, from the word modernist, is a subculture that began in the late 1950s London and spread throughout Great Britain, eventually influencing fashions and trends in other countries. It continues today on a smaller scale. Focused on music and fashion, the subculture has its roots in a small group of stylish London-based young men and women in the late 1950s who were termed modernists because they listened to modern jazz.

== Punk ==
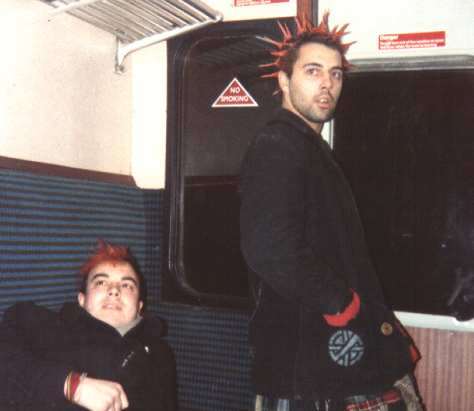
Punk fashion circa 1986, a hairstyle with dyed red liberty spikes

Punk fashion is the clothing, hairstyles, cosmetics, jewellery, and body modifications of the punk counterculture. Punk fashion varies widely, ranging from Vivienne Westwood designs to styles modeled on bands like the Exploited to the dressed-down look of North American hardcore. The distinct social dress of other subcultures and art movements, including glam rock, skinheads, greasers, and mods have influenced punk fashion. Punk fashion has likewise influenced the styles of these groups, as well as those of popular culture. Many punks use clothing as a way of making a statement.

The early, pre-fame work of designer Vivienne Westwood helped pioneer the look of early British punk with her scene-establishing clothing shops Sex and Seditionaries in the mid-1970s, co-run with Malcolm McLaren who managed the Sex Pistols. Westwood was asked by then-partner McLaren to outfit the Sex Pistols, and Westwood's designs found a canvas on Johnny Rotten and Sid Vicious. Her early work with Sex and the Sex Pistols helped to establish her as one of the most influential British designers of the 20th century.

Punk fashion has long been commercialized, with fashion designers like Zandra Rhodes, Thierry Mugler, Jean Paul Gaultier, Stephen Sprouse, and Anna Sui using punk elements in their production and the first punk-influenced fashion spreads appearing in mainstream fashion magazines as early as 1976.

== See also ==
- Indie sleaze
- Beatle boot
- Fashion of Madonna
- Cultural impact of Michael Jackson (fashion)
