= Vivienne Rohner =

Swiss fashion model (born 1998)

- Born: 1998 (age 26–27); Zürich, Switzerland
- Occupation: Model
- Years active: 2013–present
- Modelling information
- Height: 1.83 m (6 ft 0 in)
- Hair colour: Brown
- Eye colour: Green
- Agency: Next Management (Paris); Monster Management (Milan); The Squad (London); Unique Models (Copenhagen); Modelwerk (Hamburg); HEROES Model Management (New York) (mother agency)

Vivienne Rohner (born 1998) is a Swiss fashion model best known for her work with Chanel.

== Early life ==
Rohner was born in Zürich, Switzerland, to a Russian mother and a father who is of Argentine and Swiss heritage. Rohner was a self-described tomboy interested in cars rather than modelling, but entered the Elite Model Look 2013 contest at the suggestion of her mother. Rohner speaks 5 languages, including German, English, Russian, and French. She was named after Vivienne Westwood.

== Career ==
Although she did not win the Elite Model Look contest, she gained representation from her participation. As she was still 15 years old, she had a growth spurt of 140 millimetres (5.5 in) which helped her career prospects; soon afterwards she began working with Chanel. During her first season she walked for Vivienne Westwood and opened her show. In 2017, she appeared in Self Service magazine photographed by David Sims, and walked for Celine's last collection designed by Phoebe Philo before her resignation. In 2018, Rohner appeared in a watch advertisement for Marc Jacobs alongside people including Bria Vinaite. She also opened Mugler's S/S 2019 show. For the S/S 2022 Chanel show, a large photograph of her appeared on the backdrop of the runway as an homage to fashion photographers, as well as her opening the show. Just two months later, in December 2021, she opened the brand's annual pre-fall Métiers d'Art show. For Chanel's F/W ready-to-wear advertisement campaign, also featuring Rianne Van Rompaey, Mica Argañaraz, and Louise de Chevigny, she was photographed by Dutch duo Inez and Vinoodh.

Rohner currently ranks as one of the "Top 50" models on models.com. Rohner appeared on the cover of the March 2021 issue of Vogue México, dubbed the "Creativity Issue". She has also appeared on the cover of Vogue Netherlands.
