= Nara Smith =

South African and German influencer and model (born 2001)

- Born: Nara Aziza Pellmann; 27 September 2001 (age 25); Bloemfontein, South Africa
- Occupations: Model; influencer
- Years active: 2015–present
- Spouse: Lucky Blue Smith (m. 2020)
- Children: 4
- Modeling information
- Height: 5 ft 11 in (1.80 m)
- Hair color: Brown
- Eye color: Brown
- Agency: IMG Models (New York, Milan)

Nara Aziza Smith (née Pellmann; born 27 September 2001) is a South African and German model and influencer based in the United States. She is known on her social media accounts for short cooking videos in which she prepares meals from scratch while wearing extravagant clothing, narrating in a quiet voice.

== Early life ==
Nara Aziza Pellmann was born on 27 September 2001 in Bloemfontein, South Africa, to a Mosotho mother and a German father. When she was an infant, the family moved to Frankfurt, Germany, where she spent the remainder of her childhood. She stated in a TikTok video that both English and German are her native languages. Nara has two younger siblings, a brother and a sister, as well as a maternal half-brother.

== Career ==
Smith began modeling at 14 years old, having been discovered through the "We Love Your Genes" campaign of IMG Models. At 18, she moved to the United States, settling in California. In 2024, she became the face of Aritzia's Sweatfleece campaign.

Between late 2023 and early 2024, Smith began going viral on TikTok and other social media platforms for posting "tradwife" content depicting her cooking elaborate meals for her family from scratch while wearing formal clothing, as well as posting her eccentric choices of baby names as she was early in her pregnancy with her third child. As of 2024, she has over 9 million followers on TikTok and over 4 million on Instagram.

On 27 April 2026, it was announced that Smith had joined the cast of David Weil's directorial debut film Tyrant.

== Personal life ==
After meeting at Milan Fashion Week in 2019, Smith married American model Lucky Blue Smith in February 2020 in California. Together, they have three daughters and a son. Smith is also a stepmother to her husband's daughter from his previous relationship with Stormi Henley.

Much controversy has been made about Smith's religious affiliation with Mormonism, but she has stated that she does not consider herself a "hardcore Mormon" and clarified that she did not get married in a Mormon temple. (Note: To get married in the temple, both spouses would have to be committed members of the Church of Jesus Christ of Latter-day Saints.) Smith has since then also revealed that she is "not Mormon" in a social media video she posted after becoming pregnant with her latest child.

Smith has revealed that she struggles with eczema and was diagnosed with lupus. She attributes the improvement of her eczema flare-ups to her lifestyle change and her dedication to making most of her food from scratch.

== Filmography ==
=== Film ===
Key
†	Denotes films that have not yet been released

Year	Title	Role	Notes	Ref.
TBA	Tyrant †		Filming	
