= Lucky Blue Smith =

American model (born 1998)

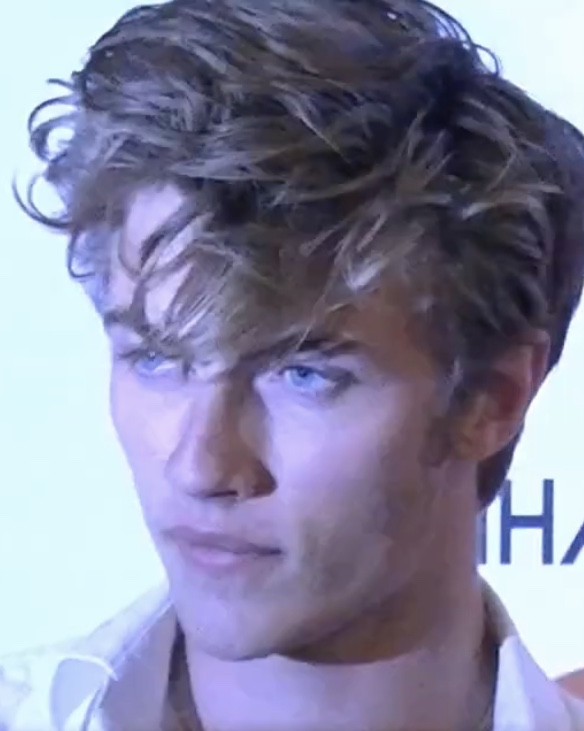
- Smith in 2019
- Born: June 4, 1998 (age 28); Spanish Fork, Utah, U.S
- Occupations: Model; influencer; musician
- Years active: 2009–present
- Spouse: Nara Smith (m. 2020)
- Partner: Stormi Henley (2015–2018)
- Children: 5
- Relatives: Pyper America (sister)
- Modeling information
- Height: 6 ft 2.5 in (189 cm)
- Hair color: Blond
- Eye color: Blue
- Agency: IMG Models (New York, Milan, London, Los Angeles, Australia)

Lucky Blue Smith (born June 4, 1998) is an American fashion model, actor and musician. In 2015 he was named "Model of the Moment" by Teen Vogue and one of the "Top 50 Male Models" by Models.com.

== Early life ==
He was raised in Utah by parents Sheridan and Dallon Smith. His mother is a former model, while his father is a hobbyist musician, who started a guitar string company. His three older sisters are Starlie Cheyenne Smith (b. 1993), Daisy Clementine Smith (b. 1995), and Pyper America Smith (b. 1997), who are all models and social media personalities. The parents gave their children relatively uncommon or unique names to offset having the most common surname in the United States.

== Career ==
=== Modeling career ===
Smith grew up in the city of Spanish Fork, Utah. When he was 12, he was signed with Next Management, and his parents moved the entire family to Los Angeles. There the younger children were homeschooled. Shortly after their arrival, Smith and his sisters were photographed by Hedi Slimane for Vogue Homme Japan, which generated immediate attention.

Smith's modeling career especially took off after he dyed his hair platinum blond at his agent's advice; the hair became his signature look for some time.

In 2015, Teen Vogue named Smith the "Model of the Moment". Although a relative newcomer, he was named to Models.com's "Top 50 Male Models" for 2015 and had the second highest number of social media followers of all male models in the industry. Many in the fashion industry acknowledge that Smith's popularity (especially among teenage girls and boys) on social media is a deciding factor for brands and editors who have hired him, as it is an increasingly important network for promotion of trends. He had shot a dozen magazine covers and fronted fashion campaigns for Philipp Plein and Tom Ford. He and several other models appeared in Tom Ford's fashion video with Lady Gaga for SS16.

He has appeared in editorials for American, French, Spanish, and Ukrainian Vogue, GQ, British Elle, Marie Claire, V, Numéro, i-D, LOVE, and W. Smith has appeared on the covers of French and Spanish Vogue, GQ, V, and Harper's Bazaar.

Smith has walked the runways for Fendi, Chanel, Roberto Cavalli, Moschino, Emporio Armani, DSquared2, Salvatore Ferragamo, Philipp Plein, Ralph Lauren, Balmain, Tom Ford, Marc Jacobs, Ermanno Scervino, Versace, Jeremy Scott, Michael Kors, John Varvatos, Etro and Bottega Veneta.

He has appeared in advertising campaigns for Tom Ford, Calvin Klein, Moncler, Tommy Hilfiger, Philipp Plein, Mavi, Penshoppe, H&M, Gap, Big C and L'Oreal.

=== Music career ===
In 2009, Smith and his three sisters formed a surf-rock band called The Atomics. Smith is the drummer and has stated that music is his real passion. The band is also represented by Next.

== Personal life ==
Smith has a daughter born in July 2017, with model Stormi Henley. On February 21, 2020, Smith married German model and social media personality Nara Pellmann. They have four children together: three daughters (born in 2020, 2024 and 2025) and a son (born in 2022).

== Filmography ==
=== Television ===
Year	Title	Role
2015	The Ellen DeGeneres Show	Himself
2016	Project Runway	Guest judge
2016	Studio C	Special Guest Star

=== Film ===
Year	Title	Role
2016	Love Everlasting	Bridger Jenkins
