= Fashion editor =

Publication's editorial supervisor of its fashion department

A fashion editor is a person that supervises the process of creating, developing and presenting content for the fashion department of a magazine, Web site, newspaper or television program.

The work of a fashion editor can be quite varied and may hold several responsibilities. Typical work includes supervising other editors and writers, writing or editing articles themselves, formulating and styling fashion photo shoots, choosing photos for publication, choosing fashion items and trends for publication, researching trends in the fashion industry and networking with industry professionals including photographers, designers and public relations professionals.

== Notable fashion editors ==
This is a list of notable fashion editors.

Name	Notable occupation	Country of notable occupation	Period of notable occupation
Alexandra Shulman	Editor-in-Chief, British Vogue	United Kingdom	1992–2017
Aliona Doletskaya	Editor-in-Chief, Vogue Russia	Russia	1998–2010
André Leon Talley	Editor-at-Large, Vogue	United States	1998–2013
Angelica Cheung	Editor-in-Chief, Vogue China	China	2005–2020
Anna Dello Russo	Editor-at-Large, Vogue Japan	Japan	2009–2021
Anna Wintour	Editor-in-Chief (later Editorial Director), Vogue	United States	1988–present
Arnaud Henry Salas-Perez	Editor-at-large, L'officiel	France	2018–present
Babs Simpson	Fashion Editor, Vogue	United States	1947–1972
Carmel Snow	Editor-in-Chief, Harper's Bazaar	United States	1934–1958
Carine Roitfeld	Editor-in-Chief, Vogue Paris	France	2001–2011
Claire Thomson-Jonville	Editor-in-Chief, Vogue France	France	2025–present
Diana Vreeland	Editor-in-Chief, Vogue	United States	1963–1971
Edward Enninful	Editor-in-Chief, British Vogue	United Kingdom	2017–2024
Emanuele Farneti	Editor-in-Chief, D la Repubblica	Italy	2022–present
Emmanuelle Alt	Editor-in-Chief, Vogue Paris	France	2011–2021
Franca Sozzani	Editor-in-Chief, Vogue Italia	Italy	1988–2016
Glenda Bailey	Editor-in-Chief, Harper's Bazaar	United States	2001–2020
Grace Coddington	Creative Director, Vogue	United States	1988–2016
Julia Sarr-Jamois	Fashion Director, British Vogue	United Kingdom	2018–2024
Lauren Sherman	Fashion Correspondent, Puck	United States	2023–present
Liz Tilberis	Editor-in-Chief, Harper's Bazaar	United States	1992–1999
Lizzette Kattan	Fashion Director, Harper's Bazaar Italia	Italy	1978–?
Marie-José Jalou	Editor-in-Chief (later Editorial Director), L'Officiel	France	1986–2021
Plum Sykes	Fashion Assistant, British Vogue	United Kingdom	1993–1997
Samira Nasr	Editor-in-Chief, Harper's Bazaar	United States	2020–present
Sara Moonves	Editor-in-Chief, W	United States	2019–present
Solange d'Ayen	Fashion Editor, Vogue Paris	France	~1920s–~1940s
Sheila Scotter	Editor-in-Chief, Vogue Australia	Australia	1962–1971
Stefano Tonchi	Editor-in-Chief, W	United States	2010–2019
Vanessa Friedman	Fashion Director, The New York Times	United States	2014–present
Virginia Pope	Fashion Editor, The New York Times	United States	1933–1955

== See also ==
- Fashion magazine
