= List of Harper's Bazaar Italia cover models =

This list of Harper's Bazaar Italia cover models (1966–1997; 2022–present) is a catalog of cover models who have appeared on the cover of Harper's Bazaar Italia, the Italian edition of American fashion magazine Harper's Bazaar. From 1966 to 1968 the magazine was published as Derby Harper's Bazaar.

== 1960s ==
=== 1966 ===
Issue	Cover model	Photographer	Ref.

=== 1967 ===
Issue	Cover model	Photographer	Ref.
March			
April			
November			

=== 1968 ===
Issue	Cover model	Photographer	Ref.

=== 1969 ===
Issue	Cover model	Photographer	Ref.
March			
April			
May	—N/a		
June			
July/August			
	Kathy Ainsworth		
December		Bob Krieger	

== 1970s ==
=== 1970 ===
Issue	Cover model	Photographer	Ref.
January/February	Virna Lisi		
March			
April/May			
June	Helga Antonia Jones		
September			
October			
November			
15 December 1970–15 January 1970	Heidi Balzer		

=== 1971 ===
Issue	Cover model	Photographer	Ref.
January/February			
15 March		Bob Krieger	
May/June			
June/July			
15 July–15 September		Bob Krieger	
15 October–15 November			
November/December		Bob Krieger	

=== 1972 ===
Issue	Cover model	Photographer	Ref.
	Cristina Agusta Luminosa		
December	Heidi Balzer	Bob Krieger	

=== 1973 ===
Issue	Cover model	Photographer	Ref.
January/February			
October	Catherine Deneuve	Bob Krieger	
November		Bob Krieger	

=== 1974 ===
Issue	Cover model	Photographer	Ref.
January/February	Jill Kennington	Bob Krieger	
March		Bob Krieger	
April		Bob Krieger	
May		Bob Krieger	
June	Mick Lindbergh		
September	Jill Kennington	Bob Krieger	
October	Florinda Bolkan		
November	Dominique Sanda	Bob Krieger	

=== 1975 ===
Issue	Cover model	Photographer	Ref.
September			

=== 1976 ===
Issue	Cover model	Photographer	Ref.
January/February			
April			
June		Bob Krieger	
July/August	Susan Smith		
September	Evelyn Kuhn	Marc Hispard	
November	Anna Andersen	Fabrizio Gianni	

=== 1977 ===
Issue	Cover model	Photographer	Ref.
April	Lauren Hutton		
May		Steve Hiett	
October			

=== 1978 ===
Issue	Cover model	Photographer	Ref.
April	Christie Brinkley	Patrick Demarchelier	
May	Juli Foster	Patrick Demarchelier	
June	Kim Charlton	Patrick Demarchelier	
September	Michelle Stevens	Patrick Demarchelier	
November	Kim Alexis	Patrick Demarchelier	

=== 1979 ===
Issue	Cover model	Photographer	Ref.
January/February	Patti Hansen	Patrick Demarchelier	
March	Esme Russell	Mike Reinhardt	
April	Kelly Emberg	Patrick Demarchelier	
July/August	Brooke Shields		
September	Carol Alt		
	Lisa Ryall	Patrick Demarchelier	

== 1980s ==
=== 1980 ===
Issue	Cover model	Photographer	Ref.
March	Beverly Johnson	Mike Reinhardt	
August	Debbie Harry	Patrick Demarchelier	

=== 1981 ===
Issue	Cover model	Photographer	Ref.
January/February	Isabelle Huppert		
July/August	Brooke Shields	Albert Watson	
September	Brooke Shields	Patrick Demarchelier	
October	Mariel Hemingway	Patrick Demarchelier	

=== 1982 ===
Issue	Cover model	Photographer	Ref.
January/February	Kim Alexis		
April	Eva Johansson	James Moore	
May	Brooke Shields	Albert Watson	
July/August			
September	Roseanne Vela		
October	Nastassja Kinski	Patrick Demarchelier	

=== 1983 ===
Issue	Cover model	Photographer	Ref.
January/February	Joanne Russell	James Moore	
July/August	Michelle Pfeiffer		
November	Frauke Quast		

=== 1984 ===
Issue	Cover model	Photographer	Ref.
February	Kelly Emberg	Les Goldberg	
March			
April	Anette Stai		
June	Kate Nelligan		
July/August	Janice Dickinson		
September	Nicole Hood	James Moore	

=== 1985 ===
Issue	Cover model	Photographer	Ref.
April	Jill Goodacre		
May	Nicole Hood		
July/August		Marco Glaviano	
October		James Moore	

=== 1986 ===
Issue	Cover model	Photographer	Ref.
January/February	Pam Ross		
March		Tom Watson	
April	Claude Heidemeyer		
June	Claude Heidemeyer		
July/August		Marco Glaviano	
October	Clarissa Burt		
December	Tania Harcourt-Cooze		

=== 1987 ===
Issue	Cover model	Photographer	Ref.
February	Diandra Douglas	Marco Glaviano	
March	Patty McHugh		
June			
August		Marco Glaviano	
September	Madeleine Robinson	Marco Glaviano	
November		Marco Glaviano	

=== 1988 ===
Issue	Cover model	Photographer	Ref.
February			
March	Sandra Barnett		
May	Gail Elliott		
July/August	Cynthia Lamontagne	Marco Glaviano	
December/January 1989			

=== 1989 ===
Issue	Cover model	Photographer	Ref.
February			
May/June			
October/November			

== 1990s ==
=== 1990 ===
Issue	Cover model	Photographer	Ref.
April		Jim Reiher	
May/June	Maureen Gallagher	François Lamy	
September		Terence Donovan	
October/November	Jean Pelton		
December/January 1991			

=== 1991 ===
Issue	Cover model	Photographer	Ref.
February	Claire Dhelens		
August		Philippe Robert	

=== 1992 ===
Issue	Cover model	Photographer	Ref.
August		David Vance	
October/November	Niki Taylor		

=== 1993 ===
Issue	Cover model	Photographer	Ref.
February	Laura		
April			
December/January 1994	Tricia Helfer		

=== 1994 ===
Issue	Cover model	Photographer	Ref.
March	Kim Renneberg	Joe Chavas	
September	Anne Pedersen	Joe Chaves	

=== 1995 ===
Issue	Cover model	Photographer	Ref.
October/November	Kirsty Hume		

=== 1996 ===
Issue	Cover model	Photographer	Ref.
February		Joe Chavas	
March			
August	Jessica Hopper		
September	Esther Cañadas		
November	Nicole Maddox		

=== 1997 ===
Issue	Cover model	Photographer	Ref.
February	Nena Blagojev		
March	Ivona Bruun	Joe Chavas	
June/July	Kim Renneberg		
August	Elizabeth Satterlee		
September	Orit	Davide Cernuschi	
October	Emilie Adams		

== 2020s ==
=== 2022 ===
Issue	Cover model	Photographer	Ref.
December	Vittoria Cerreti	Paul Kookier	
December	Alix Bouthors	Paolo Roversi	

=== 2023 ===
Issue	Cover model	Photographer	Ref.
February	Rolf Schrader	Viviane Sassen	
February	Saskia de Brauw	Nathaniel Goldberg	
February	Muna Mahamed	Melanie+Ramon	
April	Alaato Jazyper	Paolo Roversi	
April	Sara Grace Wallerstedt	Paolo Roversi	
July	Aivita Muze	Melanie + Ramon	
July	Felice Nova Noordhoff	Nathaniel Goldberg	
September	Kendall Jenner	Mario Sorrenti	
September	Mariacarla Boscono	Nathaniel Goldberg	
September	Alix Bouthors	Mark Kean	
October	Mila Van Eeten	Craig McDean	
October	Maty Fall Diba	Craig McDean	
November	Sun Mizrahi	Dan Jackson	
November	América González	Dan Jackson	
December	Apolline Rocco-Fohrer	Nick Knight	
December	Avanti Nagarth	Nick Knight	

=== 2024 ===
Issue	Cover model	Photographer	Ref.
February	Ella McCutcheon	Nathaniel Goldberg	
February	Rianne van Rompaey	Willy Vanderperre	
February	Ali Danksy	Viviane Sassen	
March	Freya Nutter	David Sims	
March	Penelope Ternes	David Sims	
March	Ella McCutcheon	David Sims	
March	Nathali Fried, Bibi Breslin	David Sims	
March	Maja Sławińska	David Sims	
March	Apolline Rocco-Fohrer	Ola Rindall	
April	He Cong	Ben Toms	
April	Alix Bouthors	Sølve Sundsbø	
April	Rosalieke Fuchs	Sølve Sundsbø	
May	Apolline Rocco-Fohrer	Nathaniel Goldberg	
May	Annabelle Weatherly	Guen Fiore	
July	Annabelle Weatherly	Guen Fiore	
July	Apolline Rocco-Fohrer	Nathaniel Goldberg	
September	Penelope Ternes		
October	Libby Bennett	Inez & Vinoodh	
October	Ella McCutcheon	Inez & Vinoodh	
October	Vivienne Rohner	Inez & Vinoodh	
October	Nigina Sharipova	Inez & Vinoodh	
December	Penelope Ternes	Willy Vanderperre	

=== 2025 ===
Issue	Cover model	Photographer	Ref.
February	Valerie Scherzinger	Glen Luchford	
February	Libby Bennett	Glen Luchford	
February	Karolina Spakowski	Craig McDean	
February	Julia Nobis	Willy Vanderperre	
March	Rihanna	Luis Alberto Rodriguez	
March	Noor Khan	David Sims	
March	Anok Yai	Willy Vanderperre	
April	Lulu Tenney	Nick Knight	
April	Ida Heiner	Paolo Roversi	
April	Mina	Paolo Ventura	
May	River Klein	Alasdair McLellan	
May	Thea Almqvist	Liv Liberg	
May	Penelope Ternes	Guen Fiore	
August	Mariacarla Boscono	Juergen Teller	
August	Awar Odhiang	Juergen Teller	
August	Elisabetta Dessy	Juergen Teller	
August	Alex Consani	Juergen Teller	
August	Dovile Drizyte Teller	Juergen Teller	
August	Noor Khan	Juergen Teller	
September	Anne Floor Wetemans	Jamie Hawkesworth	
September	Kate Moss	David Sims	
October	Steinberg	David Sims	
November	Kai Schreiber	Inez & Vinoodh	
December	Gabriel Kemplay	Alasdair McLellan	

=== 2026 ===
Issue	Cover model	Photographer	Ref.
February	Vittoria Ceretti	Willy Vanderperre	
March	Ella Rattigan	Inez & Vinoodh	
April	Libby Taverner	Johnny Dufort	
May	Saar Mansvelt Beck	Paolo Roversi	
Summer	Noor Khan	Jamie Hawkesworth	
September	Loli Bahia	Inez & Vinoodh	
October	Matilde Lucidi	Allan Hamitouche	
October	Orlando Spence	Allan Hamitouche	
November	Lilli Cummings, Annaliese Lloyd	Zac Bayly	
November	Jacqui Hooper	Alasdair McLellan	

== See also ==
- List of Vogue Italia cover models
