= Dineo Khabele =

American obstetrician and researcher

- Born: Austin, Texas
- Education: Columbia University
- Scientific career
- Workplaces: NewYork–Presbyterian Hospital; Albert Einstein College of Medicine; Meharry Medical College; University of Kansas School of Medicine; Washington University in St. Louis

Dineo Khabele is an American obstetrician who is Mitchell and Elaine Yanow Professor of Obstetrics and Gynecology at Washington University School of Medicine. In 2019 Khabele was elected to the American Society for Clinical Investigation.

== Early life and education ==
Khabele was born to Paseka Edwin and Joan Means Khabele, one of three children. She was born and raised in Lusaka, the capital city of Zambia. For high school, Khabele attended St. Stephen's Episcopal School in Austin, Texas. Her family had strong connections with the school; her aunt, Patricia Means King, was the first African-American student, and her grandmother, Bertha Sadler Means, had fought for civil rights and an end to segregated schools. She was an undergraduate at Columbia University, intent on majoring in English or Politics. Khabele arrived at Columbia during the peak of the AIDS epidemic, and was captivated by the urgency that surrounded the battle against HIV/AIDS. She started to wonder whether her political aspirations and scientific interests could contribute to solving the crisis. During her undergraduate studies she completed her pre-medical requirements, and after graduating spent a year working in public health. She remained at Columbia University for her medical studies, before starting a residency in obstetrics at the NewYork–Presbyterian Hospital. She was a fellow in gynaecologic oncology at Albert Einstein College of Medicine.

== Research and career ==
After completing her fellowship, Khabele joined Meharry Medical College as an assistant professor. She worked there for several years before joining the faculty at Vanderbilt University. In 2017 Khabele joined the University of Kansas School of Medicine. There her research considered the pathology of ovarian cancer in an effort to design new therapeutic strategies. She has studied the differences in gene expression between the different stages of ovarian cancer. She combines xenografts derived from patients with mouse models to understand both genetic and epigenetic alterations in the DNA damage response. In this instance, the damage response refers to the network of cells that sense and repair DNA lesions caused by cancer.

Khabele developed a histone deacetylase inhibitor that can be combined with a PARP inhibitor for the treatment of ovarian cancer that is resistant to chemotherapy. In early January 2020, Washington University in St. Louis announced that, after a nationwide search, they had appointed Khabele Head of the Department of Obstetrics & Gynaecology.

== Awards and honours ==
- 1999 Ovarian Cancer Research Alliance
- 2015 Elected to the Scientific Advisory Committee of the Ovarian Cancer Research Fund
- 2019 Elected to the American Society for Clinical Investigation

== Select publications ==
- Basu, Amrita; Bodycombe, Nicole E.; Cheah, Jaime H.; Price, Edmund V.; Liu, Ke; Schaefer, Giannina I.; Ebright, Richard Y.; Stewart, Michelle L.; Ito, Daisuke; Wang, Stephanie; Bracha, Abigail L. (2013-08-29). "An Interactive Resource to Identify Cancer Genetic and Lineage Dependencies Targeted by Small Molecules". Cell. 154 (5): 1151–1161. doi:10.1016/j.cell.2013.08.003. ISSN 0092-8674. PMC 3954635. PMID 23993102.
- Bhaskara, Srividya; Knutson, Sarah K.; Jiang, Guochun; Chandrasekharan, Mahesh B.; Wilson, Andrew J.; Zheng, Siyuan; Yenamandra, Ashwini; Locke, Kimberly; Yuan, Jia-ling; Bonine-Summers, Alyssa R.; Wells, Christina E. (2010). "Hdac3 Is Essential for the Maintenance of Chromatin Structure and Genome Stability". Cancer Cell. 18 (5): 436–447. doi:10.1016/j.ccr.2010.10.022. ISSN 1535-6108. PMC 3004468. PMID 21075309.
- PLOS ONE Staff (2017-05-30). "Correction: Blood type, ABO genetic variants, and ovarian cancer survival". PLOS ONE. 12 (5) e0178965. Bibcode:2017PLoSO..1278965.. doi:10.1371/journal.pone.0178965. ISSN 1932-6203. PMC 5448811. PMID 28558036.
