= Samira Nasr =

Canadian journalist (born 1970)

Samira Nasr (born 1970), is a Canadian journalist and fashion editor of Lebanese and Trinidadian descent. She became editor-in-chief of Harper's Bazaar in 2020 and is the first person of color to hold the position.

== Early life ==
Nasr was born in 1970 to a Lebanese father and a Trinidadian mother; she grew up in the Montreal suburb of Pointe-Claire. Her brother Riad Nasr is a chef. Nasr grew up reading Elle and the French edition of Glamour. Growing up, "[Fashion magazines] provided me an escape route into another world, and a fantasy."

She attended Concordia University before going to New York City to study a master's in journalism at New York University.

== Career ==
Nasr began her career in the mid-1990s as an intern at Mirabella whilst studying her masters at New York University. She worked under editor Jade Hobson in a conference room alongside Tracee Ellis Ross and Beth Buccini. After Hobson left Mirabella, Nasr continued working as an intern for her at New York. Nasr assisted Mary Alice Stevenson at Allure as a freelancer, before becoming market assistant at Vogue and then the assistant to Grace Coddington around 1996/97. In 1999, she became junior market editor at Allure.

Nasr first worked at Harper's Bazaar under Kate Betts as a fashion writer. She then became a freelance stylist, working with Cameron Diaz and Jennifer Lopez, before joining InStyle as style director in 2012.

In 2013, Nasr became the fashion director of U.S. Elle. She then joined Vanity Fair in 2018, taking on the role of Executive Fashion Director.

Nasr was appointed editor-in-chief of Harper's Bazaar in June 2020, becoming the first person of color to be in the position. She told Magazeum, “I just want to bring more people with me to the party,” interpreted to mean making the magazine more inclusive. Bazaar took home its first-ever National Magazine Award for General Excellence after her first year. She told System Magazine in a 2023 joint interview with Hanya Yanagihara:

I have a wonderful team and we are rooted in a lot of shared values; so we don’t do news, but we can do things our way. When Bazaar was founded in 1867, it was a place where women would go for the issues that caught them, but their world was so, so small; it really was just fashion. Now our lives have expanded so much, and we need to meet our audience in all these places. When I took over Bazaar, I wanted to create something that I didn’t think was already out there, to bring in what interests me, which is luxury at the intersection of culture.

== Personal life ==
Nasr has one son, Lex, whom she adopted in 2013. She described the experience: "I was there for his birth. It was a beautiful, involved, and loving process. And my job, my family, and my friends have been so supportive. Everyone is involved."

Media offices
Preceded by Glenda Bailey	Editor-in-Chief of Harper's Bazaar; 2020–present	Succeeded by current
