= Paolo Ventura =

Paolo Ventura may refer to:

- Paolo Ventura (photographer) (born 1968), Italian photographer
- Paolo Ventura (skier) (born 1996), Italian skier
