= Der Bazar =

Weekly women's fashion magazine in Berlin (1855–1933)

- Cover page of Der Bazar dated 1856
- Categories: Women's magazine; Fashion magazine
- Frequency: Biweekly (December 1854–January 1857); Weekly (January 1857–1933)
- Publisher: Louis Schäfer publishing company
- Founded: 1854
- First issue: 10 December 1854
- Final issue: 1933
- Country: German Empire
- Based in: Berlin
- Language: German

Der Bazar was a fashion magazine which was published in Berlin, German Empire, in the period 1854–1933. Its subtitle was first Technische Muster-Zeitung für Frauen. Then it was changed to Illustrirte Damen-Zeitung (Illustrated Women's Magazine) from 1 January 1857. It is one of the earliest examples of a multilingual magazine.

== History and profile ==
Der Bazar was launched on 10 December 1854 as a biweekly magazine and was based in Berlin. Its publisher was owned by Louis Schäfer. However, it was Antonie von Cosmar who suggested establishing Der Bazar. She was a playwright and novelist. From 1857 the magazine was redesigned, and its subtitle was modified, and the frequency was switched to weekly. Der Bazar folded in 1933.

== Content ==
The magazine covered fashion-related news and illustrations, as well as suggestions to retailers on methods of selling clothes to women. Der Bazar featured illustrations of ballroom outfits as clothing advice to its readers in its first January issue every year. The magazine also published articles on cosmopolitan lifestyles, home life and aesthetics.

== Editions and circulation ==
Der Bazar enjoyed international readership and had editions in other languages. By 1863, in addition to 105,000 copies in German annually, it sold 50,000 copies in English, 32,000 in French and 15,000 in Spanish. The magazine also published editions in Dutch, Russian, Italian, Hungarian and Czech, and claimed to be the most widespread journal in the world with a circulation of over half a million. By 1891 it was the best-selling women’s fashion and home magazine in Germany, targeting primarily middle to upper class women.

Der Bazar had many international editions and inspired many women's magazines. The most notable international edition is Harper's Bazaar, it began publication 1867 and has over 30 international editions. It is the only operating edition of Der Bazar. Other international editions include: Dutch De Gracieuse (1864), La Mode Illustrée (1860–1937, Paris), Magyar Bazár (1866–1904, Austriahungary), Новый русский базар [Novyi russkii bazar] (1867–1898, Saint Petersburg). In the Kingdom of Bohemia, Bazar was published as a fashion supplement to Květy (1865–1872) and Světozor (1872–1899).
