= Babs Simpson =

American magazine editor (1913–2019)

- Born: Beatrice Crosby de Mendocal; April 9, 1913; Beijing, China
- Died: January 7, 2019 (aged 105); Rye, New York
- Occupation: Magazine editor
- Employer(s): Harper's Bazaar Vogue House & Garden

Babs Simpson (born Beatrice Crosby de Menocal; April 9, 1913 – January 7, 2019) was an American magazine editor. She is best known for her 25-year tenure at Vogue as a fashion editor.

== Biography ==
The oldest of four children, Simpson was born in 1913 in Beijing, China, to Daniel Ammen de Menocal, a banker from an aristocratic Cuban family, and Beatrice (Crosby) de Menocal, a New York City socialite. The family lived in South America before settling in Boston, Massachusetts.

Simpson married William Simpson in 1935 and moved to Locust Valley, New York; they divorced seven years later. In 1944, two years after moving to Manhattan, Simpson obtained (through a friend) a position at Harper's Bazaar, working in a photographer's studio. She was then hired to work for the magazine itself, under editor Carmel Snow.

In 1947, she left Harper's Bazaar to work at Vogue, where she would remain until 1972. As a fashion editor, Simpson covered fashion shows and produced photo shoots. She collaborated with the photographer Irving Penn on many of his iconic images. She styled what would become Marilyn Monroe's final photo shoot, photographed by Bert Stern a month before her death.

After leaving Vogue, Simpson worked at House & Garden magazine from 1972 until it was shuttered in 1993.

In 2006, at the age of 93, Simpson became the oldest person to be featured in Vogue, when she appeared in its annual Age Issue. In 2012, at age 99, she was featured in In Vogue: The Editor's Eye, an HBO documentary about the fashion editors at Vogue.

Simpson was in a 35-year relationship with art dealer Paul Magriel; they lived in separate apartments in the same Manhattan apartment building throughout their relationship and did not marry. Simpson owned a Paul Lester Weiner-designed modernist home in Amagansett, New York, built for her in 1963. She spent her later years in a retirement community in Rye, New York. She died on January 7, 2019, at the age of 105, in Rye.
