= Harper's Bazaar France =

French fashion magazine

- Cover of the March 2023 launch issue, featuring Alaato Jazyper
- Editor-in-Chief: Olivier Lalanne
- Categories: Fashion
- Frequency: Monthly
- Total circulation: 604,777 (2025)
- First issue: March 2023
- Company: Editions Syds (1983–1991); Prisma Media (2023–2026); V Collection (2026–present)
- Country: France
- Based in: Paris
- Language: French
- Website: harpersbazaar.fr
- ISSN: 0754-4782

Harper's Bazaar France (stylised with Bazaar in all caps) is the French edition of the American fashion magazine Harper's Bazaar. The magazine was originally launched in 1983 and ran until 1991, however in 2023 it was relaunched and has been in operation since.

== Background ==
Harper's Bazaar France is the French edition of the American fashion magazine Harper's Bazaar. The magazine is published ten times per year with merged June/July and December/January issues as is traditional for French fashion publications.

The magazine was originally launched in 1983 and was in print until 1991, this edition was edited by Giuseppe Della Schiava and was published by Les Editions Syds France.

However, in 2023 French Bazaar was relaunched with Olivier Lalanne (ex-Editor-in-Chief of Vogue Hommes and GQ France) as its Editor-in-Chief, before launch Lalanne said in an interview about his vision for the magazine and its launch issue "We looked at the great decades of luxury and fashion, what the codes were and how I could interpret them and make them relevant today".

=== Circulation ===
Total circulation (France and international)
Year	2023	2024	2025
Circulation	538,895	602,270	604,777

=== Editors ===
Editor	Start year	End year	Ref.
Original (1983–1991)
Lizzette Katan	1983	1986	
Giuseppe Della Schiava			
Revival (2023–present)
Olivier Lalanne	2023	present	
Intérieurs (2024–present)
Isis-Colombe Combréas	2024	present	
Homme (2025–present)
Olivier Lalanne	2025	present	

== History ==
Harper's Bazaar France was first launched with the January/February 1983 issue edited by Lizzette Katan and later Giuseppe Della Schiava. Della Schiava was also the editor-in-chief and publisher of Harper's Bazaar Italia.

Bazaar France, March/April 1986 with Tina Chow

In 1991, French Harper's Bazaar ceased publication after over eight years in print. The magazine was set to be relaunched in 2001 however because of pressure on the number of pages of advertising that the magazine had to have it was never launched.

The return of Harper's Bazaar France was announced in 2013 with plans for the magazine to be published in a partnership between Hearst and Groupe Marie Claire, Alexandra Senes (founder and ex-Editor-in-Chief of Jalouse) was hired as the publications Editor-in-Chief and Daphné Hezard (ex-editor-in-chief of L'Officiel) was hired as editor-in-chief of fashion. However between December 2013 and January 2014 the entire team was fired and the launch moved to 2015, however this iteration of the magazine was never launched.

It was announced in September 2022 that Harper's Bazaar would launch in France, under a licensing contract between Hearst and Prisma Media with the first edition to be published in March 2023. Olivier Lalanne was hired to become Editor-in-Chief whilst Matthias Gurtler (editorial manager of Gala) would be the publication's editorial manager. Constance Jablonski had been approached to become a part of the magazines editorial team, however did not join.

The magazines first issue (March 2023) was released in late February 2023 with four covers all shot by Italian-American photographer Mario Sorrenti. The issue contained pieces on Lana Del Rey, Florian Zeller and editorials featuring Angelina Kendall, Karolina Spakowski, Loli Bahia and more. Along with this the page count was over 300 with 100 of that being advertising, 150,000 copies of the magazine were distributed for the launch issue.

The magazine won the launch of the year award at the Prix RELAY/SEPM des Magazines de l’année 2024. It also won Gold for the Best launch or redesign award at the Grand Prix Stratégies de l’innovation média 2024. Since 2024, Mr Jorge Jimenez Neubauer Torres is Bazaar France director.

In 2026, Vivendi acquired the luxury division of Prisma Media, Harper's Bazaar France is now published by the Vivendi subsidiary V Collection.

=== Harper's Bazaar Homme ===
The men's edition Harper's Bazaar Homme launched in October 2025 as a bi-annual publication. The first issue featured an interview with Jonathan Anderson and editorials featuring Théodore Pellerin, Betty Catroux, Parker van Noord, alongside contributions from Éric Chacour among others.

=== Harper's Bazaar Intérieurs ===
In March 2024 it was announced that a quarterly publication focused on interior design titled Harper's Bazaar Intérieurs would launch later in the year. In October the publication was launched under the direction of Isis-Colombe Combréas (founder of MilK). According to Combréas they wanted to make a publication that would "resonate with the soul of designers".

== See also ==
- Harper's Bazaar, American edition in publication since 1867
- List of Harper's Bazaar France cover models
- Harper's Bazaar France, Fashion Model Directory
- Harper's Bazaar France, models.com
