= Jacqui Hooper =

British model

- Occupation: Model
- Years active: 2024–present
- Modelling information
- Height: 5 ft 10 in (1.78 m)
- Hair colour: Blond
- Eye colour: Blue
- Agencies: Next Model Management (London, Los Angeles, Madrid, Milan, New York)

Jacqui Hooper (born 2005 or 2006) is a British model. In early 2026, British Vogue called her "the model poised to take over fashion", Karen Elson named her as part of the next generation of British it-girl models.

== Early life ==
Hooper was raised in Southampton.

== Career ==
Hooper was watching Lana Del Rey perform at Reading Festival in August 2024 when she was scouted by Next Model Management. At the time was studying forensic psychology at the University of Chichester and working part-time in a pub. Her third and breakthrough photoshoot was for the Spring/Summer 2025 Versace campaign, photographed by Mert & Marcus.

Hooper has walked shows for Chanel, Burberry, Sacai, Valentino, Hermès, Celine, Loewe, Isabel Marant, Chloé, Balenciaga, The Row, and more. Her first runway show was the final Versace show designed by Donatella Versace. She has notably featured on the cover of D la Repubblica, Harper's Bazaar France, Harper's Bazaar Italia, V, Vogue Korea, and W China. Working with photographers including Steven Meisel, David Sims and Craig McDean. She has featured in editorials for Vogue, British Vogue, Vogue France, The Gentlewoman, W, M Le Magazine du Monde, 72, and starred in advertising campaigns for Alexander McQueen, Chanel, Prada, Dolce & Gabbana.

In 2025 she won the models.com award for Breakout Model of the Year. In 2026 she was featured on the BoF 500 list of people shaping the fashion industry.
