= Virginia Pope =

American editor

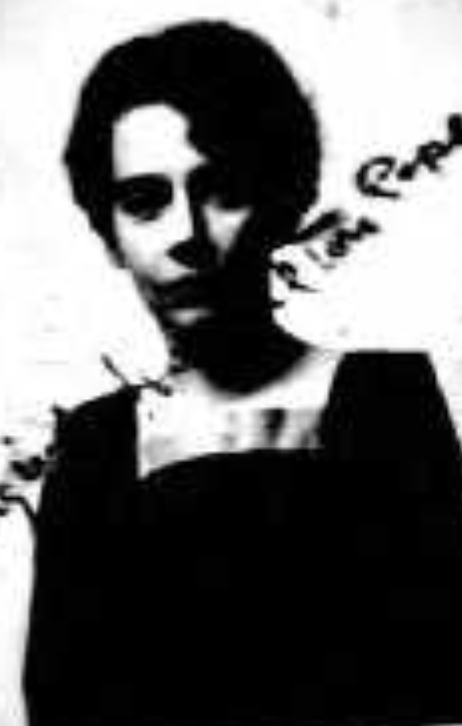
- Virginia Pope, from her 1918 passport application
- Born: Virginia Hamilton Pope; June 29, 1885; Chicago, Illinois, U.S.
- Died: January 16, 1978 (age 92); New York, New York, U.S.
- Occupation(s): Writer, editor, journalist, educator
- Known for: First fashion editor of The New York Times

Virginia Hamilton Pope (June 29, 1885 – January 16, 1978) was an American journalist and writer. She was the first fashion editor of The New York Times, from 1933 to 1955. She also taught at the Fashion Institute of Technology.

== Early life and education ==
Pope was born in Chicago, the daughter of Francis Pope and Betty Hamilton Pope. As a girl she lived in Europe with her widowed mother, and learned to speak French, German, and Italian.

== Career ==
Pope worked for the Red Cross in France during World War I, and spent some time as a resident at Hull House. She appeared on stage as a dancer with Yvette Guilbert as a young woman. She began writing about cultural events in New York City, using her language skills to interview visiting German singers, or to learn about Christmas traditions from Italy.

Pope began writing for The New York Times in 1925, and was the paper's first fashion editor, holding that title from 1933 to 1955. She was a founding member of Fashion Group International, along with Eleanor Roosevelt, Elizabeth Arden, Edith Head, Helena Rubinstein, and other notables; the organization was intended to promote the work of American designers during the Great Depression. She launched the annual Fashions of the Times showcase in 1942.

Pope was elected president of the New York Newspaperwomen's Club in 1944 and 1945, and attended the annual Met Gala. In 1948, she received an award from the Educational Foundation of the Apparel Industry, for her "outstanding contributions to the fashion industry". In 1951, she was elected president of Fashion Group, Inc. In 1953 Pope covered the coronation of Queen Elizabeth II.

After she retired from The New York Times, Pope was fashion editor of Parade magazine, beginning in 1956. Later in life she taught at the Fashion Institute of Technology, where a scholarship was named for her in 1959. In 1967 she appeared on a panel about "Handicapped Homemakers" at the annual meeting of the President's Committee on the Employment of the Handicapped, speaking to the need to consider disability in clothing and fabric design.

== Publications ==
- "The Middle-Aged Woman in Business" (1926)
- "Cottons at Home" (1943)
- "Ivan's Wife Will See These American Fashions" (1959)
- "Tops for Summer" (1965)
- "Fashions to Dream In" (1967)

== Personal life ==
Pope attended the Metropolitan Opera weekly, often with students in tow. She owned hundreds of hats, and once confessed, "I'm a drunkard for hats; I cannot bear to throw one away." She died in 1978, at her home in New York City, at the age of 92.
