= Daria Veledeeva =

Russian fashion editor

Daria Veledeeva (Russian: Дарья Веледеева, romanized: Darya Veledeyeva; born 1982), also known as Dasha Veledeeva, is a Russian journalist and fashion editor who notably served as the editor-in-chief of Harper's Bazaar Russia from 2009 to 2022 and of Harper's Bazaar Italia from 2022 to 2024. She is included in The Business of Fashion 500 list.

== Biography ==
At age 15, Veledeeva began studying journalism at Moscow State University (from 1997 to 2002). Veledeeva worked as an intern for the Russian versions of Marie Claire and Vogue before launching and editing the Russian edition of Grazia in 2007. In 2009 she exited Grazia and joined Russian Harper's Bazaar as its editor-in-chief.

Following the suspension of Russian Harper's Bazaar due to the 2022 Russian invasion of Ukraine, Veledeeva exited her position as editor-in-chief. Veledeeva was then appointed editor-in-chief of Harper's Bazaar Italia.

In 2024 following the birth of her daughter Veledeeva transitioned into the role of editor-at-large at Italian Harper's Bazaar, Massimo Russo would then replace Veledeeva in the role of editor-in-chief.
