= Ovarian Cancer Research Alliance =

U.S. nonprofit organization

- Founded: 1994
- Founder: Sol Schreiber
- Type: Nonprofit Organization / NGO
- Legal status: 501(c)(3) Non-profit
- Location: New York, New York
- Services: Charitable services
- Fields: Ovarian Cancer, Uterine Cancer, Vaginal Cancer, Cervical Cancer, and Vulvar Cancer
- Key people: Audra Moran, President & CEO; Robin S. Cohen, Vice President; John W. Hansbury, Esq., Chair; Tom Liebman, Director; Dana L. Mark, Esq., Secretary; Matthew Neal Miller, Director; Mark Tessar, CPA, CIA, Treasurer
- Website: ocrahope.org
- Formerly called: Ann Schreiber Ovarian Cancer Research Fund, Ovarian Cancer Research Fund, Ovarian Cancer National Alliance, Ovarian Cancer Research Fund Alliance, Clearity Foundation, Rivkin Center for Ovarian Cancer Research

Ovarian Cancer Research Alliance (OCRA) (also known as Ovarian Cancer Research Fund and Ovarian Cancer Research Fund Alliance) is a 501(c)3 not-for-profit organization fighting ovarian cancer and gynecologic cancers while supporting patients and families. The organization focuses on research, advocacy and patient support. Since its founding in 1994, OCRA has invested $137 million in scientific breakthroughs, helped to secure $3.8 billion in federal research funding, and supported 95,000 individuals annually through its programs. In 2023, OCRA broadened its mission and programs to cover gynecologic cancers related to ovarian cancer, such as uterine cancer, vaginal cancer, cervical cancer, and vulvar cancer.

== History ==
Ovarian Cancer Research Fund (OCRF) was founded in December 1994 as the Ann Schreiber Ovarian Cancer Research Fund by Sol Schreiber in memory of his wife, Ann, who died of ovarian cancer. The organization later became the Ovarian Cancer Research Fund. In 1997, Liz Tilberis, editor-in-chief of Harper's Bazaar and also battling ovarian cancer, became the organization's first president. Tilberis, with help from Donna Karan, started the organization's signature fundraiser, Super Saturday, hosting the first one in 1998 in the Hamptons in New York.

In 2016, the Ovarian Cancer National Alliance (OCNA), which was an organization focusing on ovarian cancer federal advocacy, awareness, and patient support, became part of OCRF.

Initially forming a single organization as the Ovarian Cancer Research Fund Alliance, the organization became the Ovarian Cancer Research Alliance (OCRA) in 2018. Ovarian Cancer Research Alliance grew once again in 2025 when two existing ovarian cancer non-profit organizations joined with OCRA. On January 1, 2025, San Diego-based Clearity Foundation joined with OCRA and on April 1, 2025, Seattle-based non-profit Rivkin Center for Ovarian Cancer Research joined OCRA.

== Research ==
OCRA funds research grants for scientists investigating ovarian cancer and related gynecologic cancers. OCRA selects research projects through a peer-review process conducted once each year by a panel of advisors, OCRA’s Scientific Advisory Committee (SAC). The SAC includes researchers and doctors from medical centers, cancer centers, and research organizations. The first grants were awarded in 1998.

- AI Accelerator Grant: For multinational interdisciplinary research using artificial intelligence to improve ovarian cancer survival rates. Introduced in 2025 by OCRA in partnership with the Global Ovarian Cancer Research Consortium and Microsoft AI for Good Lab. Projects include lead investigators from the United States, United Kingdom, Australia, and Canada. (Support of up to $1 million total over three years, with up to additional $1 million total in in-kind Azure compute credits.)
- Collaborative Research Development Grant: For ovarian cancer and/or related gynecologic cancer research projects involving several investigators within one institution or collaborations between groups in multiple institutions. (Support of $300,000 annually for three years, total of $900,000.)
- Early Career Investigator Grant: For junior faculty demonstrating strong commitment to ovarian and/or related gynecologic cancer research. (Support of $150,000 annually for three years, total of $450,000.)
- Mentored Investigator Grant: For post-doctoral fellows or clinical fellows working under the supervision of a mentor who is considered a leader in the field of ovarian cancer or related research.[17] (Support of $100,000 total to be used over one or two years.)
- Health Equity Research Grant: For ovarian and/or related gynecologic cancer research projects with health equity focus. (Support of $100,000 annually for two years, total of $200,000.)

OCRA is the largest non-governmental funding source of ovarian cancer research. Since its founding in 1994, OCRA has invested $137 million in scientific breakthroughs, helped to secure $3.8 billion in federal research funding, and supported 95,000 individuals annually through its programs.

Institutions that have received the most grants include University of Texas MD Anderson Cancer Center, University of Pennsylvania, Fox Chase Cancer Center, Duke University, and Brigham and Women's Hospital.

== Advocacy ==
OCRA works with federal policy makers, including the President, Congress, and federal agencies like the Food and Drug Administration (FDA) and the Centers for Medicare and Medicaid Services (CMS). OCRA commits its resources to be a voice for ovarian cancer survivors and to significantly reduce the number of deaths from this deadly disease by advocating at the federal level for:

- Adequate and sustained funding for ovarian cancer research and awareness programs.
- Legislation that improves quality of life and access to care for cancer patients.

=== Advocacy Day ===
Advocacy Day takes place on Capitol Hill. Ovarian cancer survivors meet one-on-one with elected officials to share their personal stories as well as ask for support on a number of federal efforts aimed at sustaining or increasing funding for federal ovarian cancer research, awareness and support.

== Support ==
OCRA's support programs focus on helping women and their families before, during and beyond diagnosis.

=== Survivors Teaching Students ===
Survivors Teaching Students aims to educate future healthcare professionals—physicians, nurse practitioners, nurses and physician assistants—to increase their understanding of ovarian cancer symptoms and risk factors so that they will be able to diagnose the disease when it is in its earlier, most treatable stages.

=== International Gynecologic Cancer Conference ===
The International Gynecologic Cancer Conference is an annual online event that provides lectures and forums from expert clinicians and researchers on topics such as clinical trials, prevention, and treatment, and is free to attend.

=== Woman to Woman Program ===
In 2011 the former OCRF began a national expansion of Woman to Woman, a local program originating at Mount Sinai Hospital. This program pairs volunteer gynecologic cancer survivors with women recently diagnosed and actively going through treatment, and offers information and support for caregivers. Woman to Woman program sites are selected through an application process. OCRFA gives each selected institution a one-year, $50,000 grant to cover the cost of a part-time program coordinator, with remaining funds allotted to a patient fund. Newly established Woman to Woman programs are expected to become self-funding after the first year.

=== Community Partner Program ===
OCRA works with not-for-profit organizations across the United States to share information and put forth a unified national voice for the ovarian cancer movement. This program was established by the former Ovarian Cancer National Alliance and was formerly called the Partner Member Program.

== Events ==
The first ovarian cancer awareness broadcast and print public service announcements were created in partnership with L'Oréal and featured Andie MacDowell. Since then, OCRA has been included in print and online publications, including books, national and international magazines and local newspapers, as a resource for ovarian cancer information.

Contributions to public discourse on ovarian cancer in are done through various forums, including Letters to the Editor in The New York Times.

The organization has four signature events. The earliest established, called Super Saturday, is an annual fundraiser held in Water Mill, New York. Super Saturday was founded in 1998 by fashion designer Donna Karan, and late OCRA President and Editor-In-Chief of Harper's Bazaar, Liz Tilberis. It is dubbed the "Rolls-Royce of garage sales" by The New York Times, and has been hosted by Kelly Ripa and sponsored by Donna Karan, QVC and InStyle. Super Saturday includes a "garage sale" of new designer products, a live on-site QVC broadcast, a children's carnival, and other activities. In 2013, Super Saturday raised $3.5 million for Ovarian Cancer Research Fund.

The Legends Gala was sponsored for several years by L'Oréal Paris, and is held every other year. A 2011 Gala was held at the American Museum of Natural History, and was hosted by Julianna Margulies. The gala has raised nearly $19 million since 2002, and typically honors individuals from a range of industries. Past honorees have included Sherry Lansing, Trudie Styler, Terry Lundgren, and Kathy Black.

A signature "Stand Up for Madeline and OCRA" comedy event is held annually in tribute to Madeline Kahn, who died from ovarian cancer. Her husband, John W. Hansbury, joined the Board of Directors of Ovarian Cancer Research Fund and created the comedy event, which is held at Carolines on Broadway.

In 2012, Ovarian Cycle, formerly an independent 501(c)(3) nonprofit, became a signature event series of the organization. Ovarian Cycle had previously held indoor cycling events to raise money for ovarian cancer research with the organization a national charity recipient of a portion of Ovarian Cycle's annual fundraising.

== Partners ==
Through corporate sponsorships and cause-marketing campaigns, the organization has received support from a variety of companies. Some sponsors have included QVC, L'Oréal Paris, Electrolux, Alex and Ani, and LeSportsac.

== Accountability ==
Ovarian Cancer Research Alliance has a four-star rating from independent charity evaluator Charity Navigator, and ranks among the top 10% of all four-star rated charities. OCRA is also a Better Business Bureau Accredited Charity that meets the BBB Wise Giving Alliance accreditation standards for charity accountability, and has had their seal since 2010. Ovarian Cancer Research Alliance is a Silver-level GuideStar Exchange participant. In October 2012, Self magazine ranked then-OCRF as one of the three best cancer charities.
