= Le Follet =

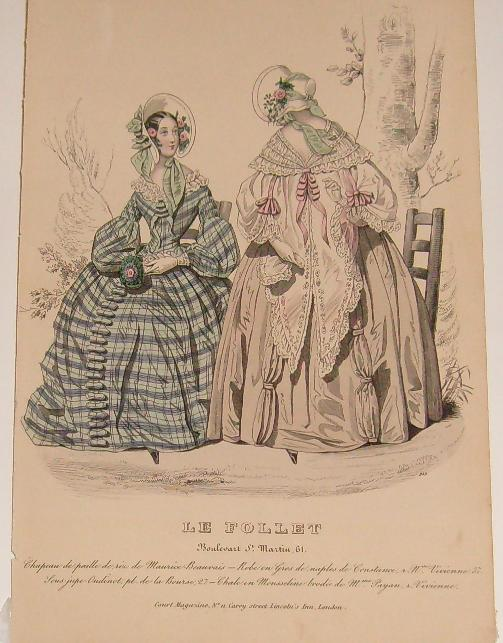
Le Follet, Paris, 1839

Le Follet was a Parisian fashion magazine, published weekly from November 1829 to 1892. It was at one point merged with Le Courrier de la Mode. It was richly illustrated with fashion plates.

Le Follet belonged to the numerous fashion magazines which from the 1820s onward replaced the previous dominance of Journal des dames et des modes. It was a part of the great industry of French fashion magazines which competed which each other during the 19th-century, many of which became popular not only in France but also internationally. Le Follet belonged to the most successful of these magazines, and alongside its rival La Mode illustrée (1860-1937), Le Follet was particularly internationally successful, with many foreign subscribers in Great Britain and the United States.

Le Follet was one of the oldest, most longlasting and most internationally famous Parisian fashion plate magazines, which makes it a valuable source of information for researching the history of fashion.
