= Nancy White (editor) =

Nancy White (July 25, 1916, Brooklyn – May 25, 2002, Manhattan) was the editor of Harper's Bazaar during the 1960s. She edited Harper's Bazaar from 1958 to 1971. When she won the top editorial job at Harper's Bazaar in 1958, she hoped she would be remembered for: authority, awareness, wit, spirit, surprise, curiosity, intelligence, timing, food for thought, vitality, balance and youth. She "... was extremely good at mixing the avant-garde with the accessible."
