= Honey (magazine) =

British monthly magazine

- Former editors: Jean McKinley; Glenda Bailey
- Staff writers: Eve Pollard, Catherine Bennett
- Categories: Teen and young women's magazine
- Frequency: Monthly
- Publisher: Fleetway/IPC
- Total circulation: 250,000
- Founder: Audrey Slaughter
- First issue: April 1960; 66 years ago
- Final issue: September 1986; 39 years ago
- Country: United Kingdom
- Based in: London
- Language: English

Honey was a monthly magazine for young women in the United Kingdom which Fleetway Publications launched in April 1960. Audrey Slaughter (later wife of Charles Wintour and stepmother of Anna Wintour) founded it, with Jean McKinley as editor. Honey is regarded as having established the teen magazine sector in the UK. At its height, Honey sold about 250,000 copies a month.

Staff on Honey included Eve Pollard and Catherine Bennett.

== Publication history ==
A cover tagline, introduced in October 1960, read "For the teens and twenties"; by 1962 this had become "Young, gay and get-ahead."

In 1964, Honey absorbed its fellow magazine Woman & Beauty.

Sales slid in the 1980s; in 1986, IPC Media (which had been formed by the merger of several companies, including Fleetway), installed editor Glenda Bailey to give it a new direction. Internal dissension and a continued lack of sales, however, forced IPC in September 1986 to merge Honey with another teen magazine, 19. (19 lasted until 2004.)
