= Loli Bahia =

French model and actress (born 2002)

- Born: Loli-Bahia Roubille; 19 September 2002 (age 24); Lyon, France
- Occupations: Model, actress
- Years active: 2020–present
- Modeling information
- Height: 180 cm (5 ft 11 in)
- Hair color: Brown
- Eye color: Blue
- Agency: Women Management (Paris, Milan, New York); Modern Paris (management)

Loli-Bahia Roubille (born 19 September 2002), known professionally as Loli Bahia, is a French model and actress. She made her runway debut in 2020 at the Louis Vuitton show. In January 2023, she became Yves Saint Laurent Beauty's brand ambassador.

== Early life ==
Loli-Bahia Roubille was born on 19 September 2002 in Lyon, France. Her father is of French and Spanish descent and her mother is of Algerian descent. The name Bahia means "dazzling beauty" in Arabic, which also nods to the state of Bahia in Brazil due to her father's passion for capoeira.

Before modeling, she studied music at the Conservatory of Lyon, playing trombone, and was a volleyball athlete for nine years.

== Career ==
Roubille was discovered after participating in the international modeling competition Egeri Tour, held in her hometown of Lyon. In October 2018, she won the final round of the competition in Paris, attracting the attention of several Parisian modeling agencies. She landed her first job at 17 and walked the Louis Vuitton fashion show in March 2020, going on to walk 65 shows that year. In 2021, she appeared on the cover of Vogue Italia and worked with renowned brands such as Saint Laurent, Chanel, Miu Miu, Valentino, Loewe, Schiaparelli, Burberry, Givenchy, Fendi, Max Mara, and Prada.

In 2023, Chanel selected her to open its Cruise 2023 Collection show and named her the face of its Autumn/Winter 23/24 ready-to-wear collection. She also opened the "La Vacanza" show, a collaboration between Versace and Dua Lipa. That same year, she appeared in Jeanne du Barry, portraying the young Jeanne du Barry. The film was presented as the opening film at the 2023 Cannes Film Festival.

Roubille walked 26 shows for Spring/Summer 2024 and 24 shows for Fall/Winter 2024, opening five and closing two. In 2024, she made notable appearances in the Tod's Spring-Summer 2024 campaign and walked for Chanel and Valentino at Paris Couture Week. She appeared in a YSL Beauty campaign for its Rouge Pur Couture the Slime lipsticks, continuing her role as an ambassador for the brand, which she joined in 2023.

She opened Vogue World in 2024 and was declared the "Woman of the 2020s". In December 2024, Roubille appeared for the first time in both American and French Vogue, and also appeared in the Chanel Eyewear campaign for Spring/Summer 2024.

Models.com has listed Roubille among its Top 50 models and nominated her for Model of the Year in 2022, 2024 and 2025, following a 2021 Breakout Star nomination.

In 2025, Roubille continued to work extensively with major fashion houses. She appeared in the Prada Fall/Winter 2025 campaign, photographed by Oliver Hadlee Pearch and directed by Frank Lebon, and was one of the faces of Alaïa's Summer/Fall 2025 campaign alongside Nastassia Legrand. In May, she appeared on the cover of Vogue Italia, photographed by Vito Fernicola. She also appeared in the Winter 2025 issue of Dazed, including its cover story photographed by Anthony Seklaoui and styled by Imruh Asha.

In 2026, Roubille appeared in the Calvin Klein Collection Spring 2026 campaign, the Chanel Spring 2026 campaign and the Balenciaga Summer 2026 campaign. She appeared on the cover of Harper's Bazaar France in March 2026, photographed by Karim Sadli, in October for its Le Spécial Mode issue, photographed by Juergen Teller, and Harper's Bazaar Italia in September, photographed by Inez and Vinoodh. She also made an appearance on the cover of AnOther Magazine for its Spring/Summer 2026 issue, photographed by Robin Galiegue and styled by Robbie Spencer.

She attended the Met Gala in May 2026 wearing Saint Laurent. Roubille continued her work with YSL, appearing in its Respiro campaign and Winter 2026 campaign and walking its Spring/Summer 2027 men's show in June and women's show in September.

== Personal life ==
Roubille has described herself as a private person and has said that she maintains a distinction between her modeling career and her personal life. In a 2026 interview with Harper's Bazaar Italia, she said that modeling was a job for which she was grateful, but that it did not define her and that she had never considered fashion a personal passion. She also said that she preferred to be as normal and simple as possible when she was not working.

She has expressed an interest in video games, particularly Call of Duty and Hogwarts Legacy. She has also described her friends, her agent and her mother as important parts of her life in Paris, where she has lived after previously attempting to relocate there several times.

In discussing her career, Roubille has said that the increasing visibility associated with modeling can become invasive and that she is protective of her private life. In 2026, she also said that she had deliberately worked less in order to have more time to consider what she wanted to pursue outside modeling, ultimately saying that she wanted to be happy.

== Filmography ==
Year	Title	Role	Notes
2023	Jeanne du Barry	Young Jeanne du Barry	Feature film
