= MilK Magazine (France) =

French magazine

MilK
- Frequency: Quarterly
- Founder: Isis-Colombe Combris
- First issue: August 2003
- Company: V Collection
- Country: France
- Based in: Paris
- Website: www.milkmagazine.net

MilK Magazine is a contemporary children's fashion and lifestyle quarterly magazine based in Paris, France.

== History ==
MilK Magazine was founded by Isis-Colombe Combris, and first published in August 2003. Karel Balas is the artistic director for MilK (2003-). The primary focus of the magazine has consistently been on contemporary children's trends in fashion and the home. The high fashion editorials star kids as young as infancy and are paired with articles including topics on haute French children's clothing, bedroom decor, et al. Ads in the magazine concern children and include companies such as Ralph Lauren, Burberry, D&G, Roberto Cavalli, Dior, as well as local (European only) high-end designers such as Wafflish Waffle and Mini Rodini. Milk Magazine is published four times a year, without the inclusion of the sister publications.

MilK Magazine has two additional, related publications that target specific themes.

=== MilK Deco ===
Milk Deco is an annually published addendum of MilK, an entire issue dedicated to items and contemporary decor for the home. This publication features offbeat, French style home interiors for the contemporary family, from children's decor to living rooms.

=== Kids Collections ===
MilK's Kids Collections is a bi-annual publication that previews about 150 designers for clothing and accessories for the child; these designers are the theoretical crème de la crème of children's fashion.

== Distribution ==
MilK is sold throughout Europe and abroad; the company also distributes and sells digital subscriptions and individual issues online as well through third parties such as Barnes & Noble Online and Zinio, a company which specialises in digital content.
