= Julia Sarr-Jamois =

French model (born 1987)

- Born: November 1987 (age 38–39); Brixton, London, England
- Known for: youngest and first black Fashion Director in Vogue's history

Julia Sarr-Jamois is an English-born French model who is currently the fashion director at British Vogue.

== Early life ==
Sarr-Jamois was born November 1987 and raised in Brixton, South London to a French mother and Senagelese father. She suffered racial abuse as a child; while at a French Lycée school in London, other students would leave bananas on her desk and say her mother was not really her mother because she was white. Sarr-Jamois subsequently left the Lycée at age 6 and switched to a local Brixton state school.

== Career ==
Sarr-Jamois started modeling at the age of 17 for companies such as Fred Perry and Diesel. At the age of 19, Sarr-Jamois joined i-D magazine and went on to become its senior fashion editor.

In 2018, Sarr-Jamois joined Vogue as fashion editor. She is the youngest women to receive the position, and the first Black woman in the role.
