= Kate Betts =

American fashion journalist and former magazine editor

Katherine Hadley Betts (born March 8, 1964) is an American fashion journalist. As of 2010, she was a contributing editor at Time and The Daily Beast, among other freelance writing positions, and reporting on fashion for CNN.

She began her career at Fairchild Publications' European office in Paris. During the 1990s, she became a senior editor at American Vogue, where she was considered the likely successor to Anna Wintour as editor-in-chief. She later became the editor of Harper's Bazaar instead, for two years. In 2011, her book Everyday Icon: Michelle Obama and the Power of Style was published by Clarkson Potter.

== Life and career ==
=== 1980s ===
Betts was born and raised in New York City. Her father, Hobart Betts, was a prominent architect; her mother Glynne was a photographer and socialite. She attended Choate Rosemary Hall and Princeton University. At Princeton she wrote for The Daily Princetonian and graduated with an A.B. in history in 1986 after completing an 127-page-long senior thesis titled "Beauty in the Streets: The Impact of Student-Worker Action on French Political Consciousness in the Events of May, 1968." After graduating, she went to work in France as a freelance journalist for Metropolitan Home, European Travel & Life and the International Herald Tribune. An article she wrote for one of these publications about boar hunting in Brittany caught the attention of publishing mogul John Fairchild. He hired her as a features writer for Fairchild Publications' Paris bureau, overseeing fashion coverage for Women's Wear Daily, W and M magazines.

She has recalled this period of her career as essential to her development as a fashion journalist.

I was a reporter. I was reporting on the lingerie business and perfume launches — what everybody at Women's Wear Daily has to start off with. That's where you learn about the industry; that's the baptism by fire. You learn about fabrics, you have to cover Premiere Vision, which is the big fabric fair in Paris, and you have to figure out who the perfume nose is at Christian Dior and the difference between the fragrances. You have to learn a lot about the people and processes of each industry within the fashion industry. And that's the best way to learn about fashion.

She wrote stories about the Sénanque Abbey's lavender fields, interviewed Jeane Kirkpatrick and penetrated closed fashion shows. In that capacity she also helped to launch W Europe.

=== 1990s ===
After two years, she became the bureau chief. The following year, 1991, she left Fairchild and Paris for New York and Condé Nast, where she took over as fashion news director at Vogue. After a difficult initial adjustment, she beefed up the magazine's news coverage. In 1995, she created its Index section, an aggregate of beauty, health and style briefs that soon became one of the magazine's most popular sections. "Kate felt you should be able to tear out pages and have information you really need," said Vogue's arts editor Michael Boodro.

This earned her the favor of the magazine's editor-in-chief, Anna Wintour. She was the only person willing to publicly disagree with "Nuclear Wintour" around the offices, further impressing her boss. In time, Betts came to be seen as the likely successor to Wintour whenever she decided to step down from one of fashion's most prestigious posts.

In the late 1990s, disagreements between the two over the magazine's direction became more entrenched. Betts felt the magazine was losing its focus on fashion, while Wintour thought the popular culture angles Betts wanted were beneath Vogue's readers. "I think Anna views her ideal reader as an Anne Bass type," said a Vogue staffer later. "She thinks the Vogue reader doesn't give a shit about hip hop". Wintour began pairing Betts with other, more junior Vogue editors, whose journalistic credentials Betts had found lacking in comparison to her own. She especially disliked Plum Sykes, whom she reportedly described as "a pretentious airhead".

Eventually, her discontent with the magazine's direction became known outside it, and Condé Nast offered her the editorship of Details. She turned it down and quietly began to look outside the company. In 1999, Hearst offered her the chance to take over Harper's Bazaar, filling the vacancy left by Liz Tilberis, another former likely successor to Wintour, who had died earlier that year of ovarian cancer. Company president Cathie Black was impressed with her demo issue.

After first denying to Wintour reports that she had accepted the position, she came in shortly after starting maternity leave and told her boss the truth, then left, after reportedly declining the company's last offer, the editorship of since-defunct Mademoiselle. Betts complained to the New York Times that Wintour hadn't even sent her a baby gift, but Wintour later wrote an editor's letter bidding her farewell and wishing her success. Three days after starting at Bazaar, she gave birth to her first child.

=== 2000s ===
==== Harper's Bazaar editorship ====
Her transition, as the youngest editor ever at America's oldest fashion magazine, was rough. Page Six reported that she had demanded that her nanny and child be allowed to accompany her on the Concorde to Paris for the shows there. She also denied another report that staffers, who had supposedly starting calling her "Anna Junior", had been forbidden to have pictures of their families at their desks. As editor, she devoted her first four months to completely redesigning the magazine, most notably its logo. She let go two-thirds of the staff and hired new, established writers like Lynn Hirschberg and Bret Easton Ellis to cover topics like politics and art. During this time she was also the subject of a Lifetime documentary, Putting Baby to Bed: Wife, Mother, and Editor in Chief.

Her goal was to remake the magazine along the lines she would have developed Vogue. "I always wanted a magazine that's avant-garde and up-to-the-minute," she said. "The whole point of fashion is to showcase what's happening and what's new". The fashion world was eager to see the result but saw pitfalls. ""I think it's exciting to have new blood in a magazine which hasn't been doing well for a very long time", said Oscar de la Renta. Others warned that "the danger in turning a high-end fashion magazine into this young, pop-culture thing is that she'll come up with Jane. And there already is a Jane. Her challenge is to make Harper's young and hip without making it cheap."

Early circulation figures showed a modest increase. An audit later on showed, in fact, that readership, already declining in the later years of Tilberis's tenure, had dropped even more. The magazine was redesigned again. Betts' staff shakeup continued. "Nobody seemed able to please her", lamented one writer. One Bazaar employee who had worked for Wintour as well noted that she had "adopted every Anna Wintourism under the sun" in her management style, without being as decisive.

It soon became apparent that it wasn't working out. Not quite two years later, in May 2001, she was replaced by Glenda Bailey of Marie Claire. Looking back on her tenure, one of her former deputies said "She was a control freak, and she wasn't good with people. It makes me think that there was truth to [the notion] that she was too young".

When asked about it later, Betts was philosophical about the experience:

It was one of those things where it was a job you can't say no to, even though I was nine months pregnant. ... It's weird, all the criticism and all the tough calls at Bazaar, and getting fired ultimately, those were all hard things to experience, but with hindsight, which is always 20/20, they were great experiences. I don't regret any of it at all. It was an amazing opportunity to learn how to edit a magazine in two years, and get it over with. There are a lot of lessons there, but the thing I always come back to is, if you're doing something you really believe in, you never regret anything you do.

==== After Bazaar ====
After Bazaar, Betts began doing freelance work for The New York Times Style section, and elsewhere in the paper. One piece in the latter category, a highly negative 2003 review in the Book Review of Lauren Weisberger's debut novel The Devil Wears Prada, the basis for the film of that name, attracted some criticism of its own. Weisberger had worked as one of Wintour's personal assistants a few years earlier, and reportedly based her main character, Miranda Priestly, a tyrannical fashion magazine editor, on Wintour. At the end, Betts belittled Weisberger for "seem[ing] to have understood almost nothing about the isolation and pressure of the job her boss was doing, or what it might cost a person like Miranda Priestly to become a character like Miranda Priestly" despite her time at Wintour's side.

Her review, it was noted, "alternates between sniping at the author and sucking up to former Vogue cronies." "As far as book reviews go, Betts' review isn't an actual review", said Gawker.com. "It's really just an ethical analysis of Weisberger's decision to trash her ex-boss in print". "What more can I say? I can't speak to anyone's agenda", Weisberger, who admitted she was curious as to why Betts had been assigned the first of two harsh reviews that ran in the Times' pages, responded in a Salon.com interview. "I don't know her. I can't presume to know." In her second novel, Everyone Worth Knowing, Weisberger had a character suggest that a pseudonymous online gossip columnist was "that ex-fashion editor—oh, what is her name? The one who keeps busy penning nasty book reviews". It was read as a reference to Betts.

In 2004, she returned to the editorial ranks when Time hired her as the editor of its Style & Design section. It was a special supplement focusing on fashion and related stories published six times a year with the U.S., Europe, and Asian editions of the magazine. "She brings the savviest sense in terms of the role that fashion plays in our lives -- and the business of fashion", said editor Jim Kelly. Betts again said she planned for the supplement to cover fashion within a broader social context as she had tried to do at Vogue and Harper's Bazaar. The supplement was discontinued in late 2009 when the luxury goods market declined due to the 2008 financial crisis. Time has retained Betts as a contributing editor, and hopes it could bring the supplement back when the economy recovers.

Media offices
Preceded by Liz Tilberis	Editor of Harper's Bazaar; 1999–2001	Succeeded by Glenda Bailey
