= Emmeline Raymond =

Emmeline Suzanne Raymond (1828-1902) was a French journalist and editor. She was the founder and managing editor of the internationally successful fashion magazine La Mode Illustrée between 1860 and 1902.

She was a pioneer within French fashion journalism, since the French fashion press had until then been dominated by male editors and journalists. She founded an unusually successful magazine in the fashion press, where the majority of publications lasted only a few years. She wrote chronicles in the magazine, where she commented contemporary events, such as the Paris Commune (1870-71). She also wrote a popular question column. She left the magazine to Aline Raymond.
