= La Mode Illustrée =

Defunct fashion magazine in France published between 1860 and 1937

La Mode Illustrée, was a French fashion magazine, published between 1860 and 1937. Its subtitle was Journal de la famille. The magazine was founded by Emmeline Raymond, headquartered in Paris and published by the Didot brothers. It was known for its high quality illustrations by Adele-Anaïs Colin Toudouze and Héloïse Leloir.

It was one of the biggest fashion magazines in the world as well as in the French fashion history during the second half of the 19th century. It has been called the first weekly fashion magazine. It was the French equivalent of the British The Englishwoman's Domestic Magazine (1852–1879). Alongside its main rival Le Follet (1829–1892), La Mode Illustrée was particularly successful internationally, with many foreign subscribers in Britain and the United States.

A reason for its success was that it was directed toward the middle and working class and offered patterns to the clothes it illustrated, as well as other subjects such as music reviews, household tips and recipes.

In 1937, the magazine merged and was absorbed into rival magazine La Mode Pratique, which continued to be published until 1951.

== Gallery ==
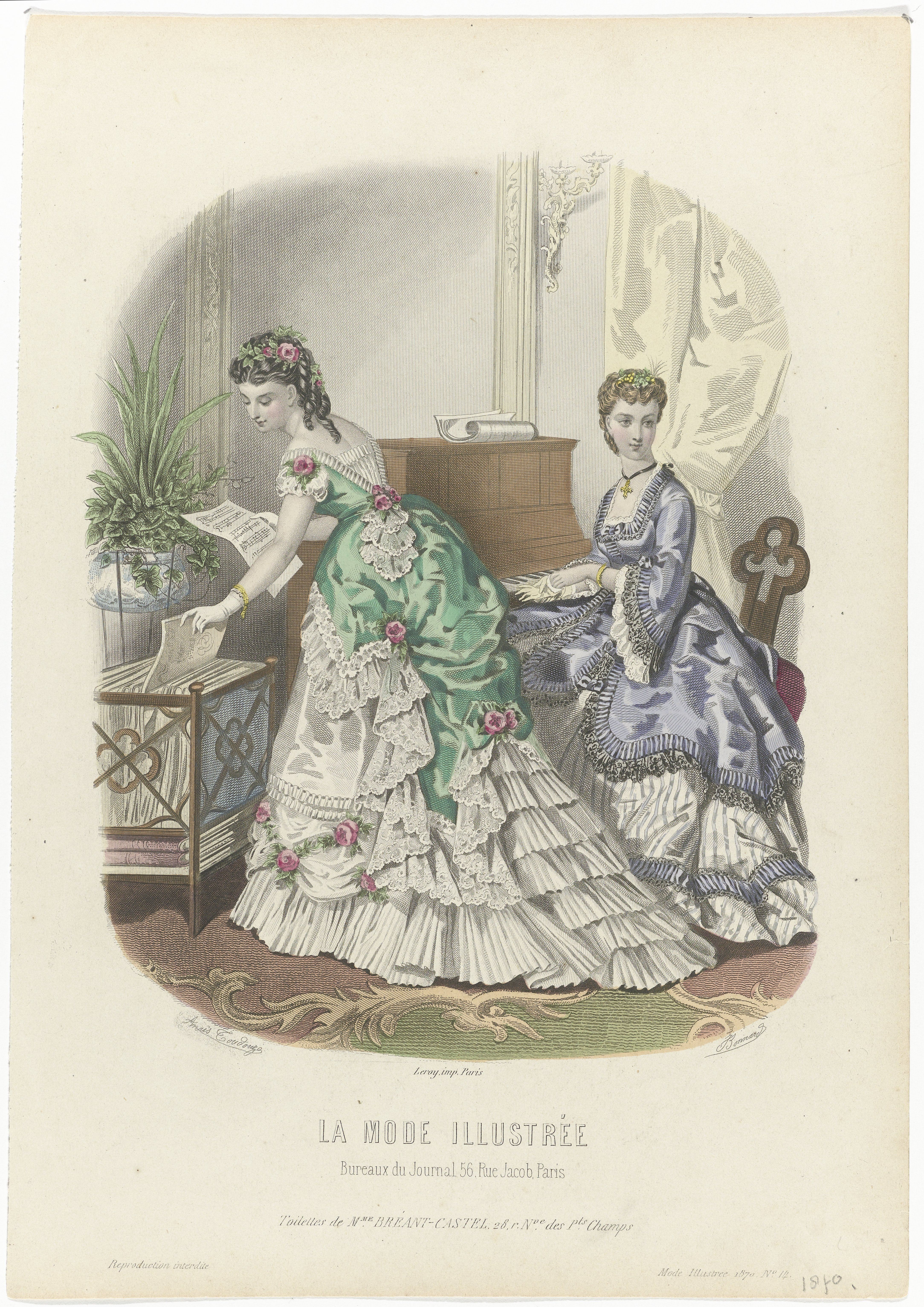
La Mode Illustrée, 1870.

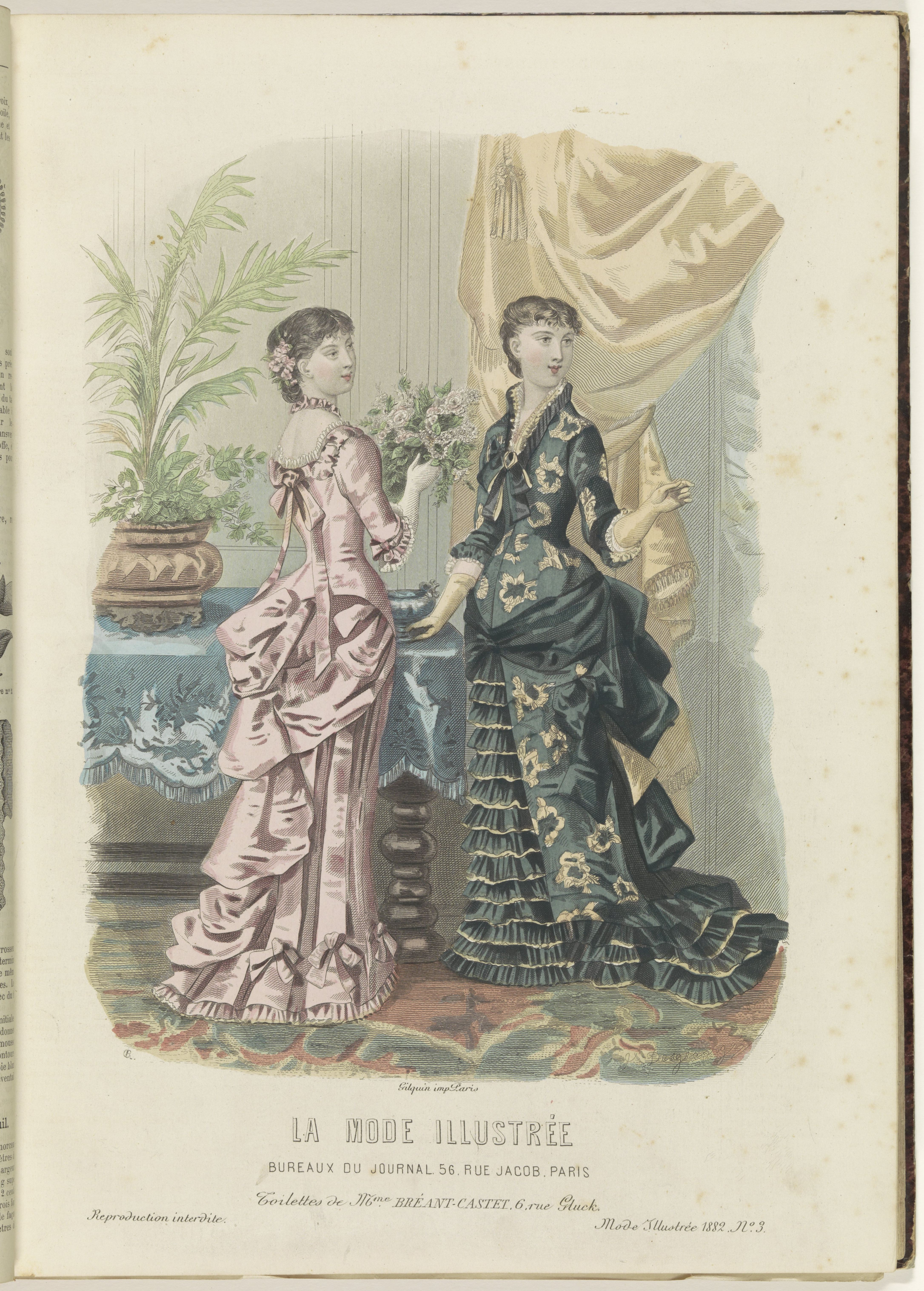
La Mode Illustrée, Journal de la Famille, 1882.

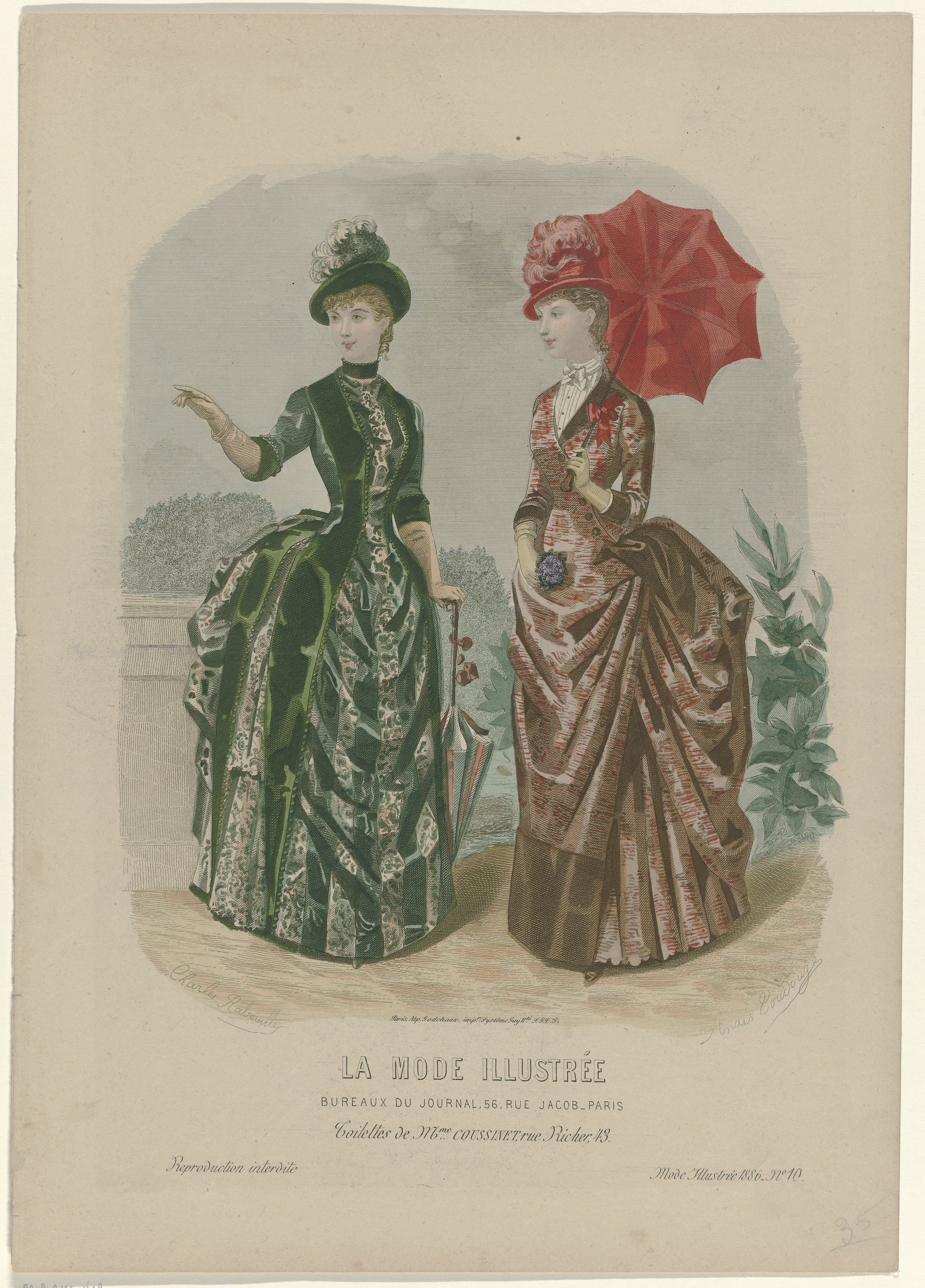
La Mode Illustrée, 1886.

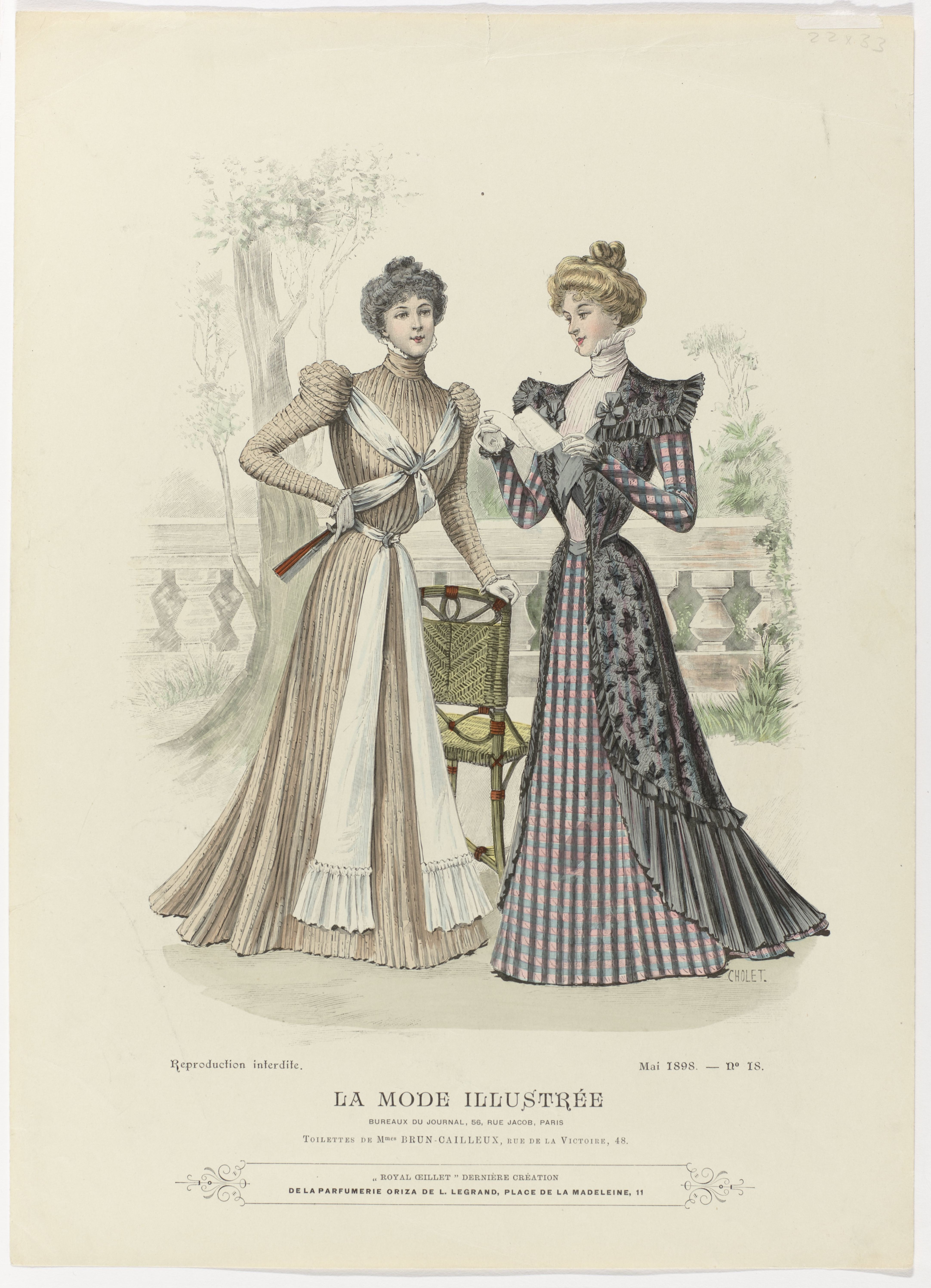
La Mode Illustrée, Mai 1898.

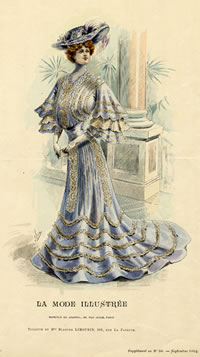
Fashion Plate 1904
