= Liz Tilberis =

British magazine editor

Elizabeth Jane Tilberis (née Kelly; 7 September 1947 – 21 April 1999) was a British fashion magazine editor of Manx and English ancestry.

Tilberis was born in Shirehampton, Bristol in 1947 and attended Malvern Girls College. She then went to Leicester Polytechnic to study fashion where she was expelled for having a man in her room. She then tried to go to Jacob Kramer Art College in Leeds. Andrew Tilberis was an art tutor and looked over her portfolio for admission. He was unimpressed with her work, but Liz gave him a speech about why she wanted to attend and won him over (and later married him).

In 1967, British Vogue held a contest requiring three essays. Liz was the runner-up and began an internship there, making tea, picking up dress pins, and ironing for fashion shoots for 25 pounds per week. Beatrix Miller, then editor-in-chief, noticed how pleasant and enthusiastic Liz was and promoted her to fashion assistant in 1970. In 1971 she married Andrew Tilberis, whom her father forbade her to marry because "he was a foreigner". They remained married for almost 30 years until her death.

During the 1970s and early 1980s, Liz began fertility treatments to try to conceive. They were not successful and she adopted sons Robert in 1981 and Christopher in 1985. After 20 years at British Vogue, she was offered a lucrative job in New York City as part of Ralph Lauren's design team in 1987. She sold her house, packed up, and was about to leave for the United States. Anna Wintour, the then-editor, suddenly called Liz into her office, and informed her that she was moving to New York to become the new editor of House & Garden. Wintour offered her job to Tilberis, who accepted. Its circulation began to rise under her leadership and she said, "My staff are respectful rather than frightened."

== New York ==
In 1992, Tilberis moved to New York City and took the helm of fashion institution Harper's Bazaar. In December 1993, she was diagnosed with ovarian cancer at age 46. She strongly believed that her use of fertility drugs caused the disease. She spent the next seven years at Bazaar balancing chemotherapy and revitalizing the 125-year-old magazine.

In January 1995, at the CFDA Awards, Tilberis received a special award for her achievements at Harper’s Bazaar from her friend Diana, Princess of Wales.

Tilberis served as President of the Ovarian Cancer Research Fund from 1997 until her death in 1999. She escorted Diana, the Princess of Wales, on one of her last visits to New York City, even though Tilberis herself was undergoing chemotherapy treatments for her cancer. Diana would telephone and write to Tilberis to give her words of comfort and encouragement, until her own death in a car accident on 31 August 1997.

== Death ==
Tilberis died on 21 April 1999 in New York City from ovarian cancer. Tributes to her were in the June and July 1999 issues of Bazaar. She was survived by her husband, Andrew Tilberis, and their two adopted sons.

Media offices
Preceded by Anna Wintour	Editor of British Vogue; 1988–1992	Succeeded by Alexandra Shulman
Preceded by Anthony Mazzola	Editor of Harper's Bazaar; 1992–1999	Succeeded by Kate Betts
