= Glenda Bailey =

British magazine editor

Dame Glenda Bailey DBE
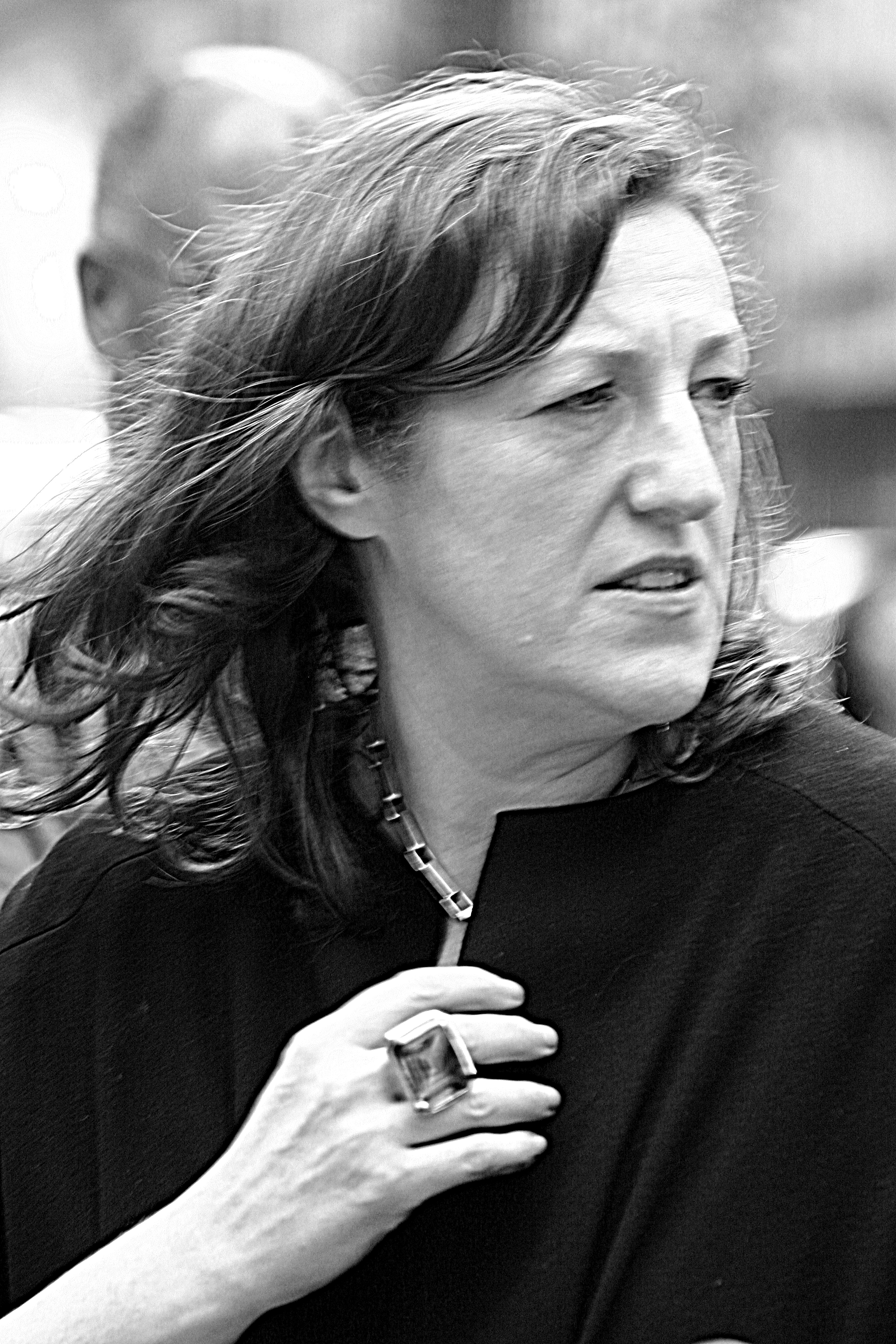
- Bailey in 2007
- Born: 16 November 1958 (age 67); Alvaston, Derby, England
- Citizenship: United Kingdom
- Education: Noel-Baker School; Kingston University
- Occupation: Magazine editor
- Years active: 1975–present
- Notable credit(s): Editor-in-chief, Marie Claire (1996–2001); Editor-in-chief, Harper's Bazaar (2001–2020)
- Spouse: Stephen Sumner

Dame Glenda Adrianne Bailey (born 16 November 1958) is a former editor-in-chief of Harper’s Bazaar, a monthly fashion magazine published by the Hearst Corporation. She was in this position from May 2001 to 2020.

== Early life ==
Bailey was born in the Alvaston area of Derby, England, on 16 November 1958. Aged two, she suffered from meningitis. She grew up in nearby Allenton and was educated at Noel-Baker School. She earned a degree in fashion design from Kingston University. Before establishing herself in publishing, she produced a collection for Guisi Slaverio in Italy in 1983.

== Career ==
Bailey served as the final editor of Honey magazine in 1986. She also launched FOLIO, a quarterly fashion magazine.

In 1988, she was appointed launch editor of the British edition of Marie Claire. Marie Claire earned her three Magazine Editor of the Year Awards, five Magazine of the Year Awards and two Amnesty International Awards, for her coverage of human rights affairs. In August 1995, she was named as International Editorial Consultant for all 26 editions of Marie Claire. From June 1996, she served as editor-in-chief of the U.S. edition of Marie Claire, before joining Harper's Bazaar as editor-in-chief in May 2001.

In January 2020, Bailey announced her plans to leave the editorial position but continue on as a consultant.

Some of Bailey's notable works during her time at Harper's Bazaar magazine were renowned for their memorable imagery.

== Personal life ==
Glenda Bailey met her long-time companion, Stephen Sumner, in 1977, and they have been together ever since. They live in New York.

== Honours ==
She was appointed Officer of the Order of the British Empire (OBE) for services to journalism and fashion in the 2008 New Year Honours. She was advanced to Dame Commander (DBE) in the 2019 New Year Honours.

She was awarded the Chevalier des Arts et des Lettres from the government of France in 2012.

Media offices
Preceded by Kate Betts	Editor of Harper's Bazaar; 2001-2020	Succeeded by Samira Nasr
