= Kai Schreiber =

British-American actress and model (born 2008)

- Born: December 13, 2008 (age 17); New York, U.S.
- Occupations: Model; actress
- Height: 1.8 m (5 ft 11 in)
- Parents: Liev Schreiber (father); Naomi Watts (mother)

Kai Schreiber (born December 13, 2008) is a British-American model and actress.

== Early life and education ==
Kai Schreiber was born on 13 December 2008. Her father is American actor Liev Schreiber, and her mother is British actress Naomi Watts. She is transgender. In a 2019 interview, Watts said that both her children developed an interest in acting after enrolling at a summer camp for the performing arts.

== Career ==
Schreiber made her film acting debut voicing a young wolf character in the 2016 film The Jungle Book alongside her older brother Sasha Schreiber, who also voiced a young wolf in the film. In March 2025, she had her modeling and runway premiere on Alessandro Michele's Valentino fall catwalk at Paris Fashion Week. She has been signed to the IMG Models agency. On September 11, 2026, Schreiber was awarded Breakthrough Model of the Year at the Daily Front Row’s Fashion Media Awards, she became the first transgender woman to win the award.
