= Paolo Ventura (photographer) =

Italian artist (born 1968)

- Born: 1968 (age 57–58); Milan, Italy
- Occupations: photographer, artist and set designer

Paolo Ventura (born 1968) is an Italian photographer, artist and set designer based in Milan.

== Life and work ==
Ventura grew up in Milan with summers spent in the hilltops of Eastern Tuscany. His father, Piero Ventura, was a children's book author during the 1970s and 1980s. At the end of the 1980s, Ventura attended the Academy of Fine Arts of Brera.

At the beginning of the 1990s he started working as a fashion photographer. In a few years he was working with fashion magazines such as Elle, MarieClaire, Amica, Vogue Gioiello, among others.

Toward the end of the 1990s, ten years into his career, Ventura gradually stepped out of the world of fashion photography and he moved to New York to pursue his personal artistic path. In his studio in Brooklyn he began to build and photograph small dioramas about World War II in Italy, based on memories and tales from his grandmother.

In 2006 Contrasto published “War Souvenirs", a collection of this work, with a foreword by the American writer Francine Prose.

The work was followed by a number of exhibitions worldwide.

The BBC included Ventura's works in the documentary about photography: “The Genius of Photography” (2007).

Three years later, he began his second major project: “Winter Stories” (2009), which became a book published by Aperture with a foreword by Eugenia Perry.

In that same period he began to work with different galleries in NY and in Europe followed by exhibitions and acquisitions from Museums and Photographic Institutions from around the world. In 2010 the Library of Congress of the U.S. acquired a collection of 142 Polaroids from his "War Souvenirs" series and the Museum of Fine Arts of Boston acquired in its permanent collection a print from his "Winter Stories".

In the following years he created other projects like “The Automaton”, published by Dewi Lewis in 2012 and “Behind The Walls” by Danilo Montanari Editore.

In 2010 he moved back to Italy, to Anghiari, a small town in Tuscany. There, in an old studio in the countryside, he began work on his project “Short Stories” using his family as his photographic subjects. In 2016 Aperture published a collection of this work in a book titled “Short Stories”.

In 2012 the Museum of Contemporary Art in Rome (MACRO) presented a solo exhibition of Ventura's work titled "Lo Zuavo Scomparso". A book by the same name is published by Punctum.

Canadian filmmaker Helen Doyle included the work of Ventura in her 2013 movie “An Ocean of Images” In the same year the Swiss Television dedicated a short documentary to Ventura's work that was transmitted on Swiss National Television.

In 2015, the Dutch documentary film-maker, Erik Van Empel, directed a full-length documentary on Ventura titled “Paolo Ventura: The Vanishing Man” which won The Prix Italia in 2016 as the best movie in the TV Performing Arts category.

In the same year, Ventura began his first collaboration in theater. Working with director Rob Ashford, he realized the scenography for Rodgers and Hammerstein’s “Carousel” at the Lyric Opera of Chicago.

In 2018, Ventura continued his work in theater, collaborating with director Gabriele Lavia, to create the set design and costumes for Ruggero Leoncavallo’s opera “Pagliacci” at the Teatro Regio in Turin.

== Bibliography ==
- "Autobiografia di un Impostore" narrata da Laura Leonelli, Johan & Levi editore, 2021
- "Paolo Ventura, Photographs and Drawings", Silvana Editoriale, 2020
- "Short Stories", Aperture, 2016
- "The Automaton", Dewi Lewis, 2012
- "Lo Zuavo Scomparso", Punctum Press, 2012
- "War Souvenirs", Contrasto Editore, 2006
- "Winter Stories", Aperture, 2009

== Exhibitions ==
=== Main solo exhibitions ===
- 2021 L'arte al tempo del Covid, MAC Museum of Contemporary Art, São Paulo, Brasil
- 2021 The Families of Man, Museo Archeologico Regionale, Aosta, Italy
- 2020 "Carousel", Camera Centro Italiano per la Fotografia, Torino, Italy
- 2020 "The Automaton", Műcsarnok Kunsthalle, Budapest, Hungary
- 2019 New 20th Anniversary Exhibition, The Margulies Collection at the Warehouse, Miami, US
- 2019 Make Believe: Fantasy, fairy tales and Magic from five contemporary photographers. Museum of Fine Arts Boston, US
- 2019 Commissione Roma 2003-2017 e le acquisizioni al patrimonio fotografico di Roma Capitale, Palazzo Braschi, Rome, Italy
- 2018 "Racconti Immaginari", Silos Armani, Milan, Italy
- 2018 "Racconti di Guerra", MAG Museo Alto Garda, Riva del Garda, Italy
- 2017 Pagliacci, Camera, Italian Center for Photography, Turin, Italy
- 2016 Mystique Narratives II, Flatland Gallery, Amsterdam, the Netherlands
- 2016 “Paolo Ventura. Obras de la Colecciòn Cotroneo”, Sala Municipales de Exposiciones, Valladolid, Spain
- 2016 Mystique Narratives, Flatland Gallery, Amsterdam, the Netherlands
- 2015 Un Mondo Infinito, Museum Het Valkhof, Nijmagen, The Netherlands
- 2015 La Città Infinita, Weinstein Gallery, Minneapolis, US
- 2015 Short Stories, Gallery Baton, Seoul, South Korea
- 2014 L’Homme à la Valise, Fotokino, Marseille, France
- 2014 Träume, Die Galerie, Munich, Germany
- 2014 L’archivio Ritrovato di V.P., Palazzo dei Pio, Carpi, Italy
- 2013 The Infinite City, Atlas Gallery, London, UK
- 2013 Il Mago Futurista, MART Casa d’Arte Futurista Depero, Rovereto, Italy
- 2013 The Infinite City, Hasted Kraeutler Gallery, New York, US
- 2013 Lo Zuavo Scomparso, Gallery Baton, Seoul, South Korea
- 2013 il Teatro della Memoria, FAR Fabbrica Arte Rimini, Rimini, Italy
- 2013 La collezione di Kim e Paolo Ventura, Museo della Citta, Rimini, Italy
- 2012 Recent Works, Italian Academy at Columbia University, New York, US
- 2012 Lo Zuavo Scomparso, MACRO Museum of Contemporary Art of Roma, Rome, Italy
- 2012 Behind the Walls, Forma Gallery, Milan, Italy
- 2012 The Funeral of the Anarchist, Obsolete, Los Angeles, US
- 2011 The Automaton of Venice, Hasted Kraeutler Gallery, New York, US
- 2011 Behind the Walls, Photographica Fine Art Gallery, Lugano, Switzerland
- 2011 L’Automa, Museo Fortuny, Venice, Italy
- 2011 Selected Works, Gallery Baton, Seoul, South Korea
- 2011 Winter Stories, Halsey Institute of Contemporary Art, Charleston, South Carolina, US
- 2009 Winter stories, Hasted Hunt Kraeutler Gallery, New York, US
- 2009 Winter Stories, Galerie Camera Obscura, Paris, France
- 2009 Winter Stories, Studio la Citta’, Verona, Italy
- 2009 Fabulous Fictions, The Hague Museum of Photography, The Hague, The Netherlands
- 2009 Winter Stories, Central Exhibition Hall, Moscow, Russia
- 2008 Storie D’Inverno, Forma International Center of Photography, Milano, Italy
- 2008 Winter Stories, Hasted Hunt Gallery, New York, United States
- 2007 Souvenir de Guerre, Maison de la Photographie Npdc, Lille, France
- 2007 Viaggio nella Memoria, Galleria Nazionale d’Arte Moderna, Rome, Italy
- 2006 In Tempo di Guerra, Forma International Center of Photography, Milan, Italy
- 2006 Souvenir de Guerre, Rencontres de la Photographie, Arles, France
- 2006 War Souvenir, Hasted Hunt Gallery, New York
- 2006 War Souvenir, Lazia Nowa, Kraków, Poland
- 2006 War Souvenir, A-3 Gallery, Moscow, Russia

=== Group exhibitions ===
- 2016 20 Years, Weinstein Gallery, Minneapolis, United States
- 2016 Photomed, Festival of Mediterranean Photography, Sanary-sur-Mer, France
- 2016 Fotografia Europea, La Via Emilia. Strade, viaggi e confini, Reggio Emilia, Italy
- 2015 Festival Photo La Gacilly, Bretagne, France
- 2015 Bienal Internacional Fotografica Bogota’, Fotomuseo, Museo National de la Fotografia de Colombia
- 2015 Italia Inside Out, I Fotografi Italiani, Palazzo della Ragione, Milan, Italy
- 2015 Questa è guerra, Palazzo del Monte di Pietà, Padova, Italy
- 2014 La Guerra che Verrà Non è la Prima 1914–2014, MART Museum of Modern and Contemporary Art, Rovereto, Italy
- 2014 Turning Point, Hungarian National Gallery, Budapest, Hungary
- 2014 La Mémoire Traversée, Eléphant Paname/Mois de la Photo, Paris, France
- 2014 Festival Internazionale di Fotografia di Roma, MACRO Museum of Contemporary Art, Rome, Italy
- 2014 Historia, Miradas de Artistas, Marco, Museo de Arte Contemporanea de Vigo, Spain
- 2014 Histoire, Regards d’Artistes, Hotel des Arts, Centre du Conseil General du Var, Toulon, France
- 2013 Next Stop Italy, The Phillips Collection, Washington D.C., US
- 2012 Do You Remember the First Time?, Atlas Gallery, London, UK
- 2012 New Acquisitions from the MACRO Collection, MACRO Museum of Contemporary Art, Rome, Italy
- 2012 La Collezione di Italo Zannier, PARCO Galleria D’Arte Moderno e Contemporanea, Pordenone, Italy
- 2012 La Fotografia della Collezione Trevisan, MART Museum of Modern and Contemporary Art, Rovereto, Italy
- 2012 The Silent Village, DOX Centre for Contemporary Art, Prague, Czech Republic
- 2011 Sembianze, Galleria D’Arte Moderna e Contemporanea, Repubblica di San Marino
- 2011 54th Venice Biennial, Italian Pavilion, Venice, Italy
- 2011 Otherworldly, Museum of Art and Design, New York, US
- 2011 New Yorker Fiction/Real Photography, Steven Kasher Gallery, New York, US
- 2009 Manipulating Reality, Centro di Cultura Contemporanea Strozzina, Palazzo Strozzi, Florence, Italy
- 2009 Collection from Maison Europeenne de la Photographie, Italian Cultural Institute, São Paulo, Brazil
- 2009 La Photographie Italiens des Annees 50 a Nos Jours, Centre National de l’Audiovisuel, Luxembourg
- 2009 Photography From the Permanent Collection, Lowe Art Museum, Miami, US
- 2009 New York Photographs, Hasted Hunt Gallery, New York, US
- 2008 Contemporary Photographic Views, Weinstein Gallery, Minneapolis, US
- 2008 Inside the Human Space, Isola di San Servolo, Venice, Italy
- 2008 The New Original Photo, Interalla Gallery, Seoul, South Korea
- 2008 Una Historia Privada, Theatro Circo Price, Madrid, Spain
- 2008 Ellis Island and Beyond, Aperture Gallery, New York, US
- 2008 Roma, Palazzo Delle Esposizioni, Rome, Italy
- 2008 Una Storia Privata, Museo Bilotti, Rome, Italy
- 2007 NYC, Phillips De Pury Gallery, New York, US
- 2007 Hunter and Hanted, Sara Tecchia Gallery, New York, US
- 2007 On the Wall, Aperture Gallery, New York, US
- 2007 Luci su Milano, New art acquisitions of Unicredit Bank, Milan, Italy
- 2006 Une Histoire Privee, Maison Europeenne de la Photographie, Paris, France
- 2026 Die verlorene Elster und andere Angelegenheiten, Jaeger Art, Berlin, Germany
