= Lizzette Kattan =

Honduran journalist and fashion editor

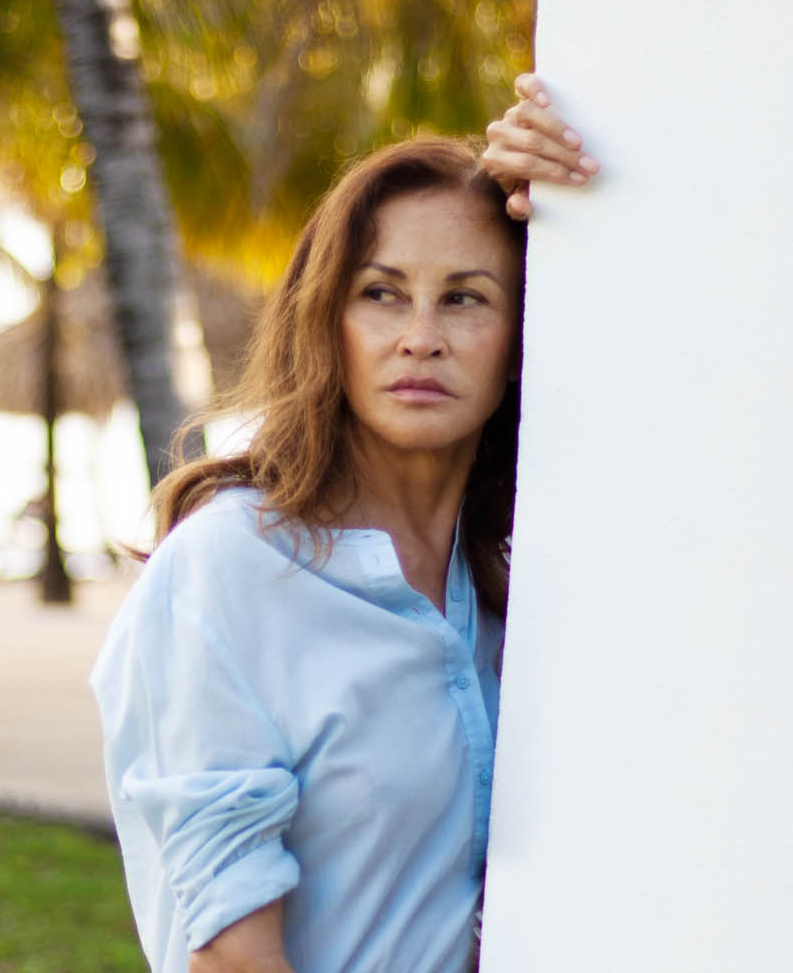
- Born: December 18, 1951 (age 74); San Pedro Sula, Honduras
- Occupations: Fashion editor, Model
- Employers: Harper's Bazaar France (Editor-in-Chief); Harper's Bazaar Italia (Fashion Director); Harper's Bazaar Italia Uomo (Fashion Director); Cosmopolitan Italia (Fashion Director)
- Website: lizzettekattan.com

Lizzette Kattan is a Honduras-born fashion editor who worked between Milan and New York in the 1970s and 1980s. She previously worked as Editor-in-Chief of Harper's Bazaar France and for a number of Italian publications (Harper's Bazaar Italia, Uomo Bazaar Italia, Cosmopolitan Italia). She is most known for helping to launch the career of one of the first supermodels Gia Carangi. She later worked as Consulate General of Honduras in Milan.

== Early life ==
Kattan was born in San Pedro Sula, Honduras. However, she moved to New York City with her family. She pursued a degree in anthropology at Hunter College and was discovered by Eileen Ford and signed to Ford Models.

== Career ==
=== Fashion career ===
Kattan signed with Ford Models and started work in New York City. She was featured on the cover of GQ in 1975. She also was featured in Elle, Vogue Italia and Harper's Bazaar Italia.

She then started organising photoshoots for Italian Cosmopolitan before became fashion director of Cosmopolitan Italia in 1976. In 1978, she became fashion director of Harper's Bazaar Italia and launched Men's Harper's Bazaar (later Uomo Harper's Bazaar) in 1979. She also shared a house with Calvin Klein in the 1970s.

She helped to discover Herb Ritts and Steven Meisel. During this time she also helped to launch Gia Carangi's career by booking her back-to-back shoots for Italian Bazaar with photographer Chris von Wangenheim.

Harper's Bazaar France was launched in 1983 with Kattan as Editor-in-Chief. Kattan retired from her positions at Harper's Bazaar France, Italia and Cosmopolitan Italia in 1986.

=== Diplomatic career ===
In 1990 Kattan became the commercial attaché of the Honduran Embassy in Rome. She was responsible for various publications attracting foreign investment from Italy. In 2002 Kattan became the Consul general of Honduras in Milan, which serviced the region of Lombardy and Venice. This post was held until 2007.

In effort to promote the country of Honduras, Kattan created a quarterly publication called "Honduran Highlights" The publication existed from 1990 to 2007.

Kattan helped to create two museum exhibits in Europe. "Les Mayas au pays de Copan" was held at the Abbaye de Daoulas from 5 April and 7 September 1997. "I Maya di Copan – L'atene del Centro America" was exhibited at the Palazzo Reale in Milan from 3 October 1997 to 1 March 1998.
