= Harper's Bazaar =

American women's fashion magazine

- Cover of the May 2024 issue, featuring Christy Turlington
- Editor-in-Chief: Samira Nasr
- Creative Director: Laura Genninger
- Categories: Fashion
- Frequency: Monthly
- Total circulation: 740,613 (2024)
- First issue: November 2, 1867; 159 years ago, New York City
- Company: Harper & Brothers (1867–1913); Hearst (1913–present)
- Country: United States
- Based in: New York City
- Language: English
- Website: harpersbazaar.com
- ISSN: 0017-7873

Harper's Bazaar is an American monthly women's fashion magazine that covers fashion, beauty, shopping, celebrity, culture, and bridal. Under the control of Hearst since 1913, it was originally published by Harper & Brothers. Since 2020, Samira Nasr has served as editor-in-chief, Glenda Bailey served as editor-in-chief from 2001 to 2020, previous editors include Liz Tilberis, Carmel Snow, and Mary Louise Booth among others.

Based at Hearst Tower in Midtown Manhattan, New York City. It is the oldest operating women's fashion magazine in the world, published since November 2, 1867. It was published as Harper's Bazar until 1929.

Harper's Bazaar UK, launched in 1929, as the first international edition. As of 2026, there are thirty-two international editions. Six of these editions are published by Hearst (Harper's Bazaar España, Harper's Bazaar Italia, Harper's Bazaar Japan, Harper's Bazaar Nederland, Harper's Bazaar Taiwan). The other twenty-six editions are published under license or in co-operation with Hearst.

== Background ==
Harper's Bazaar is an American fashion magazine. The magazine was founded in 1867 by Harper & Brothers as Harper's Bazar (and has since been operating as Harper's Bazaar since 1929); it is the oldest fashion magazine still in operation and was based on and originally was the American version of the German publication Der Bazar.

According to the publication's current editor-in-chief, Samira Nasr, "Harper's BAZAAR uses fashion as a way to explore the forces shaping culture today and to tell the most urgent stories of the moment." While the publisher and owner, Hearst, describes it as "the style resource for women at every age, showcasing visionary stylists, photographers, and designers with authority and insider insight."

The magazine has achieved notability for its innovative art direction under art director Alexey Brodovitch (who worked with the publication from 1934 to 1958). Norman Norell called it "a photographer's magazine" in reference to its innovative photography. Along with this achievement, the reinvention of the magazine under editor-in-chief Liz Tilberis and art director Fabien Baron, who wanted to make it into "the most beautiful fashion magazine in the world," is regarded as turning it back into a fashion publishing industry powerhouse. The magazine is considered the long-time rival to Vogue.

=== Circulation ===
Total circulation
Year	2016	2017	2018	2019	2020	2021	2022	2023	2024
Circulation	767,297	761,891	768,121	762,088	739,338	730,257	741,653	740,242	740,613

=== Editors ===
Editor-in-Chief	Start year	End year	Ref.
Mary Louise Booth	1867	1889	
Margaret Elizabeth Sangster	1889	1899	
Elizabeth Jordan	1900	1913	
William Martin Johnson	1913	1914	
Hartford Powell	1914	1916	
John Chapman Hilder	1916	1920	
Henry Blackman Sell	1920	1926	
Charles Hanson Towne	1926	1929	
Arthur H. Samuels	1929	1934	
Carmel Snow	1934	1957	
Nancy White	1958	1971	
James Brady	1971	1973	
Anthony Mazzola	1973	1992	
Liz Tilberis	1992	1999	
Kate Betts	1999	2001	
Glenda Bailey	2001	2020	
Samira Nasr	2020	present	

== History ==
=== The beginnings of Bazar (1867–1913) ===
The journal had been inspired by the German Der Bazar (meaning "The Bazaar"), which was a weekly fashion journal published in Berlin, Germany. Fletcher Harper suggested the idea of an American edition of the publication, in partnership with the German original. However, his brothers (James and Joseph Harper) believed that they were already too busy with their other publications (Harper's Monthly and Harper's Weekly) and that they would not be able to launch a new publication. Fletcher then decided to publish the magazine himself; however, upon hearing this, the brothers changed their minds and decided to publish it together.

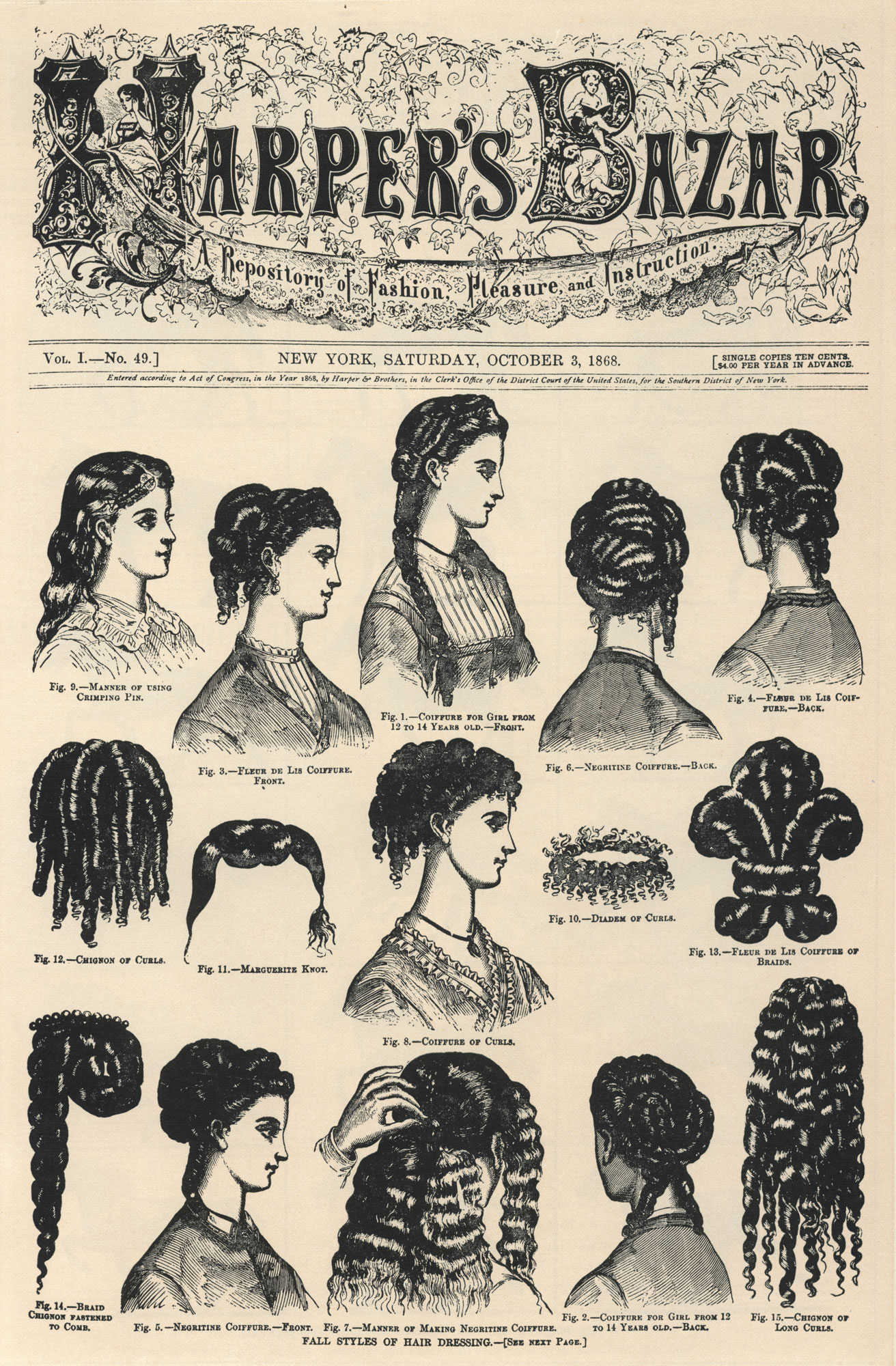
Front cover illustrating hairstyles, Vol. I, No. 49 (October 3, 1868)

The publication debuted on November 2, 1867, and was published by Harper & Brothers, based in New York City and edited by Mary Louise Booth. The magazine was published in a folio tabloid-size format and published weekly, with the subtitle of "A Repository of Fashion, Pleasure, and Instruction." During this time Harper's Bazar was able to stay ahead of other American publications like Godey's Lady's Book and Peterson's, which had to copy their illustrations from French magazines and re-engrave the printing plates of the latest fashions; however, due to the partnership with Der Bazar, the magazine would be sent the electrotypes of the original printing plates, which led to Harper's Bazar publishing the latest illustrations at the same time as the European journals, which was months ahead of the other American publications. This gave Harper's Bazar an edge above the other American publications for many years.

Bazar's circulation was estimated at reaching between 70,000 and 100,000 within the first six weeks of circulation.

Bazar under Mary L. Booth (who stayed as the editor of the publication until her death in 1889) has been described as a "covert" voice for women's rights, with articles about women's suffrage and equal rights. However, Booth herself denied that the magazine had any political agenda or attempted influence. Booth was succeeded by Margaret Elizabeth Sangster, who stayed as editor-in-chief until 1899; she left and was replaced by Elizabeth Jordan when the publication was reorganized.

Early contributors include George William Curtis (who authored Manners Upon the Road), Thomas Wentworth Higginson (who authored Women and Men), James Payn (writing articles under "Robert Kemble, of London"), Wilkie Collins, F. W. Robinson, Virginia Woolf, George Eliot, and Emmeline Raymond (the Paris correspondent).

In 1901 the magazine's format made the transition from a weekly to a monthly magazine and changed its format/size, partly because of the publisher's financial struggles.

=== Sale to Hearst and rebranding to Harper's Bazaar (1913–1934) ===
William Randolph Hearst purchased the magazine from Harper & Brothers in 1913; before Hearst's purchase, the magazine had steadily been losing money for many years. Under Hearst ownership, the magazine was turned into a thick glossy magazine and had a distinct editorial change from a Harper's publication to a Hearst publication.

Sell left the magazine in 1926, and Charles Hanson Towne became editor-in-chief; under his tenure, a second "a" was added to "Bazar," and the publication was renamed Harper's Bazaar with the November 1929 issue. Arthur Samuels then replaced Towne in 1929.

=== Under Carmel Snow and Nancy White (1934–1971) ===
Carmel Snow became fashion editor in 1932, joining Harper's Bazaar from its rival Vogue, which caused a stir in the fashion industry. Snow felt like she was constrained at Vogue, with Edna Woolman Chase (editor-in-chief of Vogue) having no intentions to leave her position. Edna Woolman Chase and Condé Nast (publisher of Vogue) believed her exit was "the ultimate betrayal," and Nast never spoke to Snow again.

One of Snow's first influential editorials was published in 1933. Snow and the Hungarian photojournalist Martin Munkácsi went to a windswept and cold Long Island beach for a swimwear fashion shoot, which was Munkácsi's first fashion story. A photo was taken featuring model Lucile Brokaw, who ran towards the camera, which became part of fashion magazine history, with most fashion photoshoots previously featuring still, mannequin-like models shot in a studio; the photo became a turning point for fashion photography.

Snow became the magazine's editor-in-chief in 1934, and Samuels joined House Beautiful. Snow's approach was more hands-on than Samuels', who was more distant to his employees, preferring a "closed-door" approach. Following a design exhibition at the Art Directors Club, Snow was introduced to the work of Russian artist Alexey Brodovitch, to whom she offered the art director role that evening. Brodovitch revolutionized magazine design and became "virtually the model for the modern magazine art director." He also introduced the Didot typeface to the magazine, which then became the logo font and would be copied by notable publications including Vogue, L'Officiel, and Elle using Didot as their logo typeface. Brodovitch is also remembered for his use of white space and cropped layouts. Truman Capote said about Brodovitch, "What Dom Pérignon was to champagne ... so [Brodovitch] has been to ... photographic design and editorial layout."

One of his assistants at Bazaar was Tony Lane, who later became the art director of Rolling Stone.

Brodovitch also introduced photographers. Richard Avedon, Louise Dahl-Wolfe, Irving Penn, and more were at the magazine along with the artists Man Ray, Jean Cocteau, and Andy Warhol. Avedon had fourteen interviews with the magazine before being hired.

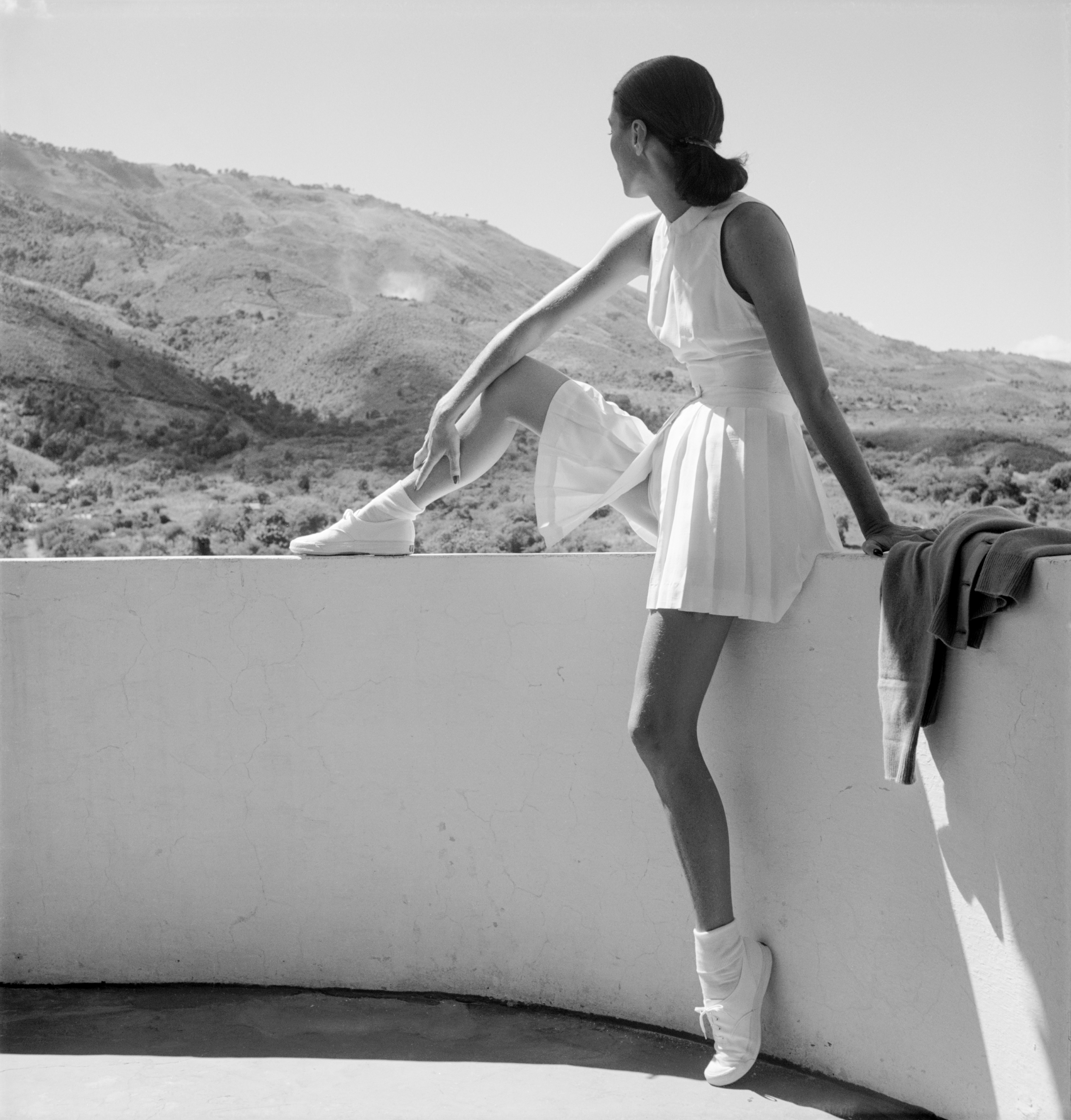
Toni Frissell, published in Harper's Bazaar, February 1947

In late 1935, Snow saw a young Diana Vreeland dancing at the St. Regis Hotel bar in a lace dress by Chanel, and the day after, commissioned her to write a column called "Why Don't You... ?" for the magazine. A typical suggestion: "Why don't you... wear, like the Duchess of Kent, three enormous diamond stars arranged in your hair in front?" She was immortalized in Funny Face, where she inspired the character Maggie Prescott (played by Kay Thompson). Richard Avedon was also immortalized in the film, inspiring the character Dick Avery (played by Fred Astaire). Avedon shot many iconic photographs for the magazine (working from 1945 as a staff photographer), including models roller skating in the Place de la Concorde, Dovima with circus elephants, and more glamorous editorials with large sets.

Guadeloupean model and dancer Ady Fidelin became the first Black model to be featured in a major American fashion magazine when she was featured in Harper's Bazaar in September 1937.

Following the Second World War, Junior Bazaar was launched, aiming to be a competitor to Mademoiselle and Seventeen. However, in 1948 it was merged into Harper's Bazaar, with Snow believing that she was diverting too much of her energy to the publication.

Gleb Derujinsky joined the magazine in 1950 (working with the magazine until 1968) and produced some of the magazine's most iconic images. Derujinsky was a pioneer juxtaposing haute couture dresses with deserts, junkyards, fairgrounds, and airports, with the comparison between Avedon and Derujinsky being "Avedon shot dresses and clothes; Gleb shot women living in them."

In 1957 Derujinsky traveled across the world with Nena von Schlebrügge and Ruth Neumann in cooperation with Pan Am for the inauguration of the Boeing 707. They shot in eleven countries in 28 days.

Brodovitch (who struggled with alcoholism) was fired in 1958, and his wife died the following year, all of which led to a severe depression, and following a 1967 hip injury, he moved to the south of France, where he died in 1971.

The February 1959 issue featured an editorial with Chinese-American model China Machado (often erroneously reported as the cover, which is actually the December 1959 issue with Dovima); she was one of the first people of color to be featured in a major American fashion magazine. The publisher (Hearst) was against the inclusion of Machado, believing that Southern subscribers would quit their subscriptions. She later became the magazine's senior fashion editor and then fashion director.

The Nancy White era circulation peaked in 1969 with 442,220 copies circulated.

=== Under James Brady; Politics and American Reality (1971–1973) ===
Following an advertising and circulation decline, James Brady of Women's Wear Daily was hired as publisher and editorial director. Under Brady the magazine was rebranded into a "fashionable news monthly", features on elegance, poetry, and fiction were replaced in favor of pithy journalistic features and for the first time political discussion. Notable contributions during his tenure include a Tennessee Williams article on the movement opposing the United States involvement in the Vietnam War, a profile on Gloria Steinem, and a photo of Faye Dunaway in bed with an unshaven armpit. Fashion models were replaced with "real" people and famous personalities. After three months, Nancy White resigned from her position as editor-in-chief and Brady had total control over the magazine. After failing to "connect" with readers and advertisers Brady was fired and replaced by Anthony Mazzola. His final issue was January 1973, Mazzola's first issue was February 1973.

=== Under Anthony Mazzola (1973–1992) ===
Nonnie Moore was hired as fashion editor in 1980, having served in the same post at Mademoiselle. The New York Times noticed the changes she made at Harper's Bazaar, highlighting how the magazine had been "looking a little dowdy" but that Moore had "noticeably sharpened the magazine's fashion [perspective]" by showing "brighter, younger, and more stylish" looks, complimenting her use of "young and exciting fashion photographers," such as Oliviero Toscani.

=== Under Liz Tilberis and Kate Betts; Era of Elegance (1992–2001) ===
Liz Tilberis was appointed editor-in-chief in 1992; she was previously the editor-in-chief of British Vogue, replacing Anna Wintour in 1987.

=== Under Samira Nasr (2020–present) ===
In June 2020, Samira Nasr was appointed to the role of editor-in-chief. Nasr became the black editor-in-chief of the title, she previously worked for Vanity Fair, Elle USA, and InStyle. In October 2020, Leah Chernikoff was appointed executive editor, Laura Genninger was appointed creative director, and Kaitlyn Greenidge was appointed features director. The first issue under Nasr was published for November 2020, featuring Liya Kebede photographed by Christopher Anderson on the cover.

At the 2022 National Magazine Awards, Harper's Bazaar was awarded for general excellence for service and lifestyle.

In December 2025, Harper's Bazaar's parent company, Hearst Magazines, announced a company-wide ban on the promotion of fur in all its editorial content and advertising. This policy applies to Harper's Bazaar and its international editions.

== Harper's Bazaar worldwide ==
Harper's Bazaar operates 33 editions around the world, as of 2026:

- Harper's Bazaar Arabia (in Arabic and English, since 2007 | Edited by Olivia Philips)
- Harper's Bazaar Australia/New Zealand (in English, from 1984 to 1990 and then from 1998 to 2020, since 2021)
- Harper's Bazaar Brasil (in Portuguese, since 2011 | Edited by Patricia Carta)
- 时尚芭莎 Harper's Bazaar China (in Simplified Chinese, since 2002 | Edited by Simona Sha)
- Harper's Bazaar Česká Republika (in Czech, since 1997 | Edited by Nora Grundová)
- Harper's Bazaar Colombia (in Spanish, since 2026 | Edited by Helena Fadul)
- Harper's Bazaar Ecuador (in Spanish, since 2025 | Edited by Daniela Segovia Velasteguí)
- Harper's Bazaar en Español (in Spanish, from 1967 to 1967; since 1980 | Edited by María José Guzmán)
- Harper's Bazaar France (in French, from 1983 to 1991; since 2023 | Edited by Olivier Lalanne)
- Harper's Bazaar Germany (in Germany, from 1963 to 1970 and then from 1985 to 1992; since 2013 | Edited by Kerstin Schneider)
- Harper's Bazaar Greece (in Greek, since 1996 | Edited by Eleni Pateraki)
- Harper's Bazaar Hong Kong (in Traditional Chinese, since 1988 | Edited by Vincent Choi)
- Harper's Bazaar India (in English, since 2009 | Edited by Rasna Bhasin)
- Harper's Bazaar Indonesia (in Indonesian, since 2000 | Edited by Ria Lirungan)
- Harper's Bazaar Italia (in Italian, from 1966 to 1997; since 2022 | Edited by Massimo Russo)
- Harper's Bazaar Japan (in Japanese, since 2000 | Edited by Maiko Matsuda)
- Harper's Bazaar Kazakhstan (in Russian, since 2004 | Edited by Larissa Azanova)
- Harper's Bazaar Korea (in Korean, since 1996 | Edited by In-Ae Hwang)
- Harper's Bazaar Malaysia (in English, since 2003 | Edited by Aziz Draim)
- Harper's Bazaar Nederland (in Dutch, from 1986 to 1990; since 2014 | Edited by Miluska Van 't Lam)
- Harper's Bazaar Polska (in Polish, from 2013 to 2019; since 2026 | Edited by Zuzanna Krzątała)
- Harper's Bazaar Qatar (in English, since 2022 | Edited by Bianca Bonomi)
- Harper's Bazaar Saudi (in Arabic and English, since 2021 | Edited by Olivia Philips)
- Harper's Bazaar Srbija (in Serbian, since 2014 | Edited by Petar Janošević)
- Harper's Bazaar Singapore (in English and Malay, since 2001 | Edited by Kenneth Goh)
- Harper's Bazaar España (in Spanish, since 2010 | Edited by Inmaculada Jiménez Mateos)
- Harper's Bazaar Taiwan (in Traditional Chinese, since 1989 | Edited by Kora Hsieh)
- Harper's Bazaar Thailand (in Thai, since 2005 | Edited by Chanin Faikhun)
- Harper's Bazaar Türkiye (in Turkish, since 1993 | edited by Inan Kirdemir)
- Harper's Bazaar Ukraine (in Ukrainian, since 2008 | Edited by Iryna Tatarenko)
- Harper's Bazaar United Kingdom (in English, since 1929 | Edited by Lydia Slater)
- Harper's Bazaar United States (in English, since 1867 | Edited by Samira Nasr)
- Harper's Bazaar Viet Nam (in Vietnamese, since 2011 | Edited by Tran-Nguyen Thien-Huong (Venus Tran))

=== Future editions ===
- Harper's Bazaar Philippines (in English, launching in November 2027)

=== Defunct ===
- Harper's Bazaar Argentina (in Spanish, from 2011 to 2017 and from 2018 to 2019)
- Harper's Bazaar Bulgaria (in Bulgarian, from 2008 to 2017 and from 2023 to 2025)
- Harper's Bazaar Chile (in Spanish, from 2015 to 2019)
- Harper's Bazaar Romania (in Romanian, from 2007 to 2021)
- Harper's Bazaar Russia (in Russian, from 1996 to 2022)

=== Harper's Bazaar UK ===
The Harper's Bazaar UK edition was first published in London in 1929. In November 1970, New York City-based Hearst Communications amalgamated it with Queen magazine (which dated from 1862) to form Harpers & Queen. The magazine was widely perceived to be focused on British "high society" and the lives of socialites and the British aristocracy. In March 2006, it was renamed Harper's Bazaar, bringing it in line with its international sister titles, and repositioning it as a more celebrity-oriented fashion magazine. Harper's Bazaar UK has a long history of literary contributions from leading writers, including Evelyn Waugh, Henry James, Thomas Hardy, and Virginia Woolf. It maintains that connection today, with recent articles written by Ali Smith, Jeanette Winterson, and Margaret Atwood, and runs its own Literary Salon.

== Harper's Bazaar worldwide editors ==
Country/region	Circulation dates	Editor-in-chief	Start year	End year
United Kingdom (Harper's Bazaar UK)	1929–present	Joyce Reynolds	1929	1945
United Kingdom (Harper's Bazaar UK)	1929–present	Anne Scott-James	1945	1951
United Kingdom (Harper's Bazaar UK)	1929–present	Eileen Dickson	1951	1964/1965
United Kingdom (Harper's Bazaar UK)	1929–present	Ruth Lynam	1965	1968
United Kingdom (Harper's Bazaar UK)	1929–present	Nancy White	1965	1967
United Kingdom (Harper's Bazaar UK)	1929–present	Pamela Carmichael	1968	1969
United Kingdom (Harper's Bazaar UK)	1929–present	Michael Griffiths	1968	1969
United Kingdom (Harper's Bazaar UK)	1929–present	Willie Landels	1970	1986
United Kingdom (Harper's Bazaar UK)	1929–present	Nicholas Coleridge	1986	1989
United Kingdom (Harper's Bazaar UK)	1929–present	Sally O'Sullivan	1989	1990
United Kingdom (Harper's Bazaar UK)	1929–present	Vicki Woods	1990	1993
United Kingdom (Harper's Bazaar UK)	1929–present	Fiona Macpherson	1993	2000
United Kingdom (Harper's Bazaar UK)	1929–present	Lucy Yeomans	2000	2012
United Kingdom (Harper's Bazaar UK)	1929–present	Justine Picardie	2012	2019
United Kingdom (Harper's Bazaar UK)	1929–present	Lydia Slater	2020	present
Germany (Harper's Bazaar Deutsch)	1963–1970 (Note: for Switzerland)	Merlene Zollikofer-Wylie		
Germany (Harper's Bazaar Deutsch)	1985–1992	Helene-Maria Kurbjeweit-Rose	1985	1986
Germany (Harper's Bazaar Deutsch)	1985–1992	Leo Pesch	1986	1987
Germany (Harper's Bazaar Deutsch)	1985–1992	Brigitte Franke	1987	1989
Germany (Harper's Bazaar Deutsch)	1985–1992	Manuela Müller	1989	1990
Germany (Harper's Bazaar Deutsch)	1985–1992	Peter Gimm	1991	1992
Germany (Harper's Bazaar Deutsch)	2013–present	Margit J. Mayer	2013	2014
Germany (Harper's Bazaar Deutsch)	2013–present	Kerstin Schneider	2015	present
Latin America (Harper's Bazaar En Español)	1967–1967 (Note: for Spain)	José Antonio Plaza	1967	1967
Latin America (Harper's Bazaar En Español)	1980–present	Sara Barcelo de Castany	1980	
Latin America (Harper's Bazaar En Español)	1980–present	Victoria Puig de Lange	1984	
Latin America (Harper's Bazaar En Español)	1980–present	Laura Díez Barroso de Laviada		
Latin America (Harper's Bazaar En Español)	1980–present	Lucía Alarcón de Zamacona		
Latin America (Harper's Bazaar En Español)	1980–present	María José Guzmán	2021	present
Italy (Harper's Bazaar Italia)	1968–1997	Cesare E. Beltrami	1968	
Italy (Harper's Bazaar Italia)	1968–1997	Maria Pia Chiodoni Beltrami		1974
Italy (Harper's Bazaar Italia)	1968–1997	Catherine Murray di Montezemolo		
Italy (Harper's Bazaar Italia)	1968–1997	Giuseppe Della Schiava		1997
Italy (Harper's Bazaar Italia)	2022–present	Daria Veledeeva	2022	2024
Italy (Harper's Bazaar Italia)	2022–present	Massimo Russo	2024	present
France (Harper's Bazaar France)	1983–1991	Lizzette Katan	1983	1986
France (Harper's Bazaar France)	1983–1991	Giuseppe Della Schiava	1986	1991
France (Harper's Bazaar France)	2023–present	Olivier Lalanne	2023	present
Australia, New Zealand (Harper's Bazaar Australia/New Zealand)	1984–1990 (Note: as Harper's Bazaar Australia; for Australia)	Lee Tulloch	1984	1985
Australia, New Zealand (Harper's Bazaar Australia/New Zealand)	1984–1990	Sylvia Rayner		1988
Australia, New Zealand (Harper's Bazaar Australia/New Zealand)	1984–1990	Alexandra Joel	1988	1989
Australia, New Zealand (Harper's Bazaar Australia/New Zealand)	1984–1990	Suzy Baldwin	1989	1990
Australia, New Zealand (Harper's Bazaar Australia/New Zealand)	1998–2020 (Note: as Harper's Bazaar Australia; for Australia)	Karin Upton Baker	1998	2001
Australia, New Zealand (Harper's Bazaar Australia/New Zealand)	1998–2020	Alison Veness	2001	2008
Australia, New Zealand (Harper's Bazaar Australia/New Zealand)	1998–2020	Jamie Huckbody	2008	2009
Australia, New Zealand (Harper's Bazaar Australia/New Zealand)	1998–2020	Edwina McCann	2009	2012
Australia, New Zealand (Harper's Bazaar Australia/New Zealand)	1998–2020	Kellie Hush	2012	2018
Australia, New Zealand (Harper's Bazaar Australia/New Zealand)	1998–2020	Eugenie Kelly	2018	2020
Australia, New Zealand (Harper's Bazaar Australia/New Zealand)	2021–present	Eugenie Kelly	2021	2021
Australia, New Zealand (Harper's Bazaar Australia/New Zealand)	2021–present	Jillian Davison	2021	2025
The Netherlands (Harper's Bazaar Nederland)	1986–1990	Gerda Zwartjes		1989
The Netherlands (Harper's Bazaar Nederland)	1986–1990	Manuela Müller	1989	1990
The Netherlands (Harper's Bazaar Nederland)	1986–1990	Gemma Naninck	1989	1990
The Netherlands (Harper's Bazaar Nederland)	2014–present	Cécile Narinx	2014	2018
The Netherlands (Harper's Bazaar Nederland)	2014–present	Miluska van 't Lam	2018	present
Hong Kong (Harper's Bazaar Hong Kong)	1988–present	Josephine Chan	1988	
Hong Kong (Harper's Bazaar Hong Kong)	1988–present	Crystal Wong	2022	2024
Hong Kong (Harper's Bazaar Hong Kong)	1988–present	Vincent Choi	2024	present
Taiwan (Harper's Bazaar Taiwan)	1989–present	Josephine Chan		
Russia (Harper's Bazaar)	1996–2022	Arina Rozova	1996	2000
Russia (Harper's Bazaar)	1996–2022	Shahri Amirkhanova		
Russia (Harper's Bazaar)	1996–2022	Daria Veledeeva	2009	2022
China (Harper's Bazaar China)	2002–present	Su Mang	2002	2018
China (Harper's Bazaar China)	2002–present	Simona Sha	2018	present
Malaysia (Harper's Bazaar Malaysia)	2003–2020	Natasha Kraal	2003	2020
Malaysia (Harper's Bazaar Malaysia)	2021–present	Abdul Aziz Draim	2021	present
Kuwait, Oman, Qatar, United Arab Emirates (Harper's Bazaar Arabia)	2007–present	Rachel Sharp	2007	2009
Kuwait, Oman, Qatar, United Arab Emirates (Harper's Bazaar Arabia)	2007–present	Louise Nichol	2009	2018
Kuwait, Oman, Qatar, United Arab Emirates (Harper's Bazaar Arabia)	2007–present	Salma Awwad	2019	2020
Kuwait, Oman, Qatar, United Arab Emirates (Harper's Bazaar Arabia)	2007–present	Olivia Philips	2020	present
India (Harper's Bazaar India)	2008–present	Sujata Assomull Sippy	2008	2012
India (Harper's Bazaar India)	2008–present	Nishat Fatima	2012	2016
India (Harper's Bazaar India)	2008–present	Nonita Kalra	2016	2020
India (Harper's Bazaar India)	2008–present	Nandini Bhalla	2020	2023
India (Harper's Bazaar India)	2008–present	Rasna Bhasin	2023	present
Ukraine (Harper's Bazaar Ukraine)	2008–2021	Natalia Guzenko	2008	2014
Ukraine (Harper's Bazaar Ukraine)	2008–2021	Anna Zemskova	2014	2021
Ukraine (Harper's Bazaar Ukraine)	2023–present	Kateryna Popova	2023	present
Argentina (Harper's Bazaar Argentina)	2011–2017	Ana Torrejón	2011	2017
Brazil (Harper's Bazaar Brasil)	2011–present	Patricia Carta	2011	present
Poland (Harper's Bazaar Polska)	2013–2019	Joanna Góra	2013	2018
Poland (Harper's Bazaar Polska)	2013–2019	Anna Zaleska	2018	2019
Poland (Harper's Bazaar Polska)	2026–present	Zuzanna Krzątała	2026	present
Saudi Arabia (Harper's Bazaar سعودي)	2021–present	Olivia Philips	2021	present
Ecuador (Harper's Bazaar Ecuador)	2025–present	Daniela Segovia Velasteguí	2025	present
Colombia (Harper's Bazaar Colombia)	2026–present	Helena Fadul	2026	present

== See also ==
- Lists of Harper's Bazaar cover models
