= Harper's Bazaar Italia =

Italian fashion magazine

- Cover of the November 2025 issue, Kai Schreiber by Inez and Vinoodh
- Editor-in-Chief: Massimo Russo
- Editorial Director: Stefano Tonchi
- Executive Creative Directors: M/M Paris
- Categories: Fashion
- Frequency: Monthly
- First issue: October 1966; 60 years ago December 2022; 3 years ago
- Company: Derby Società Editrice (1966–1968); Edizioni Syds (1969–1997); Hearst Italia (2020–present)
- Country: Italy
- Based in: Milan
- Language: Italian
- Website: harpersbazaar.com/it
- ISSN: 2974-6388

Harper's Bazaar Italia is an Italian monthly fashion magazine; the magazine serves as the Italian edition of Harper's Bazaar. It has been published in Milan since 2022 and was previously published between 1966 and 1997.

== Background ==
Harper's Bazaar Italia is the Italian edition of the American fashion magazine Harper's Bazaar. Founded in 1966 as Derby Bazaar, in 1969 it was renamed Harper's Bazaar Italia and ceased publication in 1997. In 2020, the magazine returned to digital platforms and from 2022 in print.

The magazine is a monthly publication published 10 times per year.

=== Editors ===
Editor	Start year	End year	Ref.
Original version (1966–1997)
Maria Pia Chiodoni Beltrami		1974	
Catherine Murray di Montezemolo			
Giuseppe della Schiava		1997	
Revival (2020–present)
Alan Prada	2020	2021	
Massimo Russo	2021	2022	
Daria Veledeeva	2022	2024	
Massimo Russo	2024	present	

== History ==
Harper's Bazaar entered Italy in October 1966 when the horse-racing magazine Derby was rebranded to Derby Harper's Bazaar. Following the December 1968 issue Derby and Harper's Bazaar were split into separate publications. Derby (founded in 1946) would merge with Esquire in 1974, ceasing publication in 1987.

Bob Krieger served as Art Director from 1970 to 1975. In 1977, Lizzette Kattan was appointed to the role of fashion director. During Kattan's tenure the magazine would launch the career of supermodel Gia Carangi following the production of back-to-back shoots for the magazine with photographer Chris von Wangenheim.

In December 1997, Hearst revoked the license for the magazine held by Giuseppe della Schiava reporting that royalties had not been paid for several years.

Harper's Bazaar returned to the Italian market in February 2020 with a digital-only presence, based around 'BAZAAR TV' a content-based platform that featured videos on fashion and lifestyle. The platform was modelled after a range of TV formats and genres and distributed on third-party networks such as the Agenzia Nazionale Stampa Associata, Di Lei magazine, and on Huawei Video.

Alan Prada served as the editor-in-chief (formerly of Elle Italia, L'Uomo Vogue, and Vogue Italia) of the publication and the magazine was set to enter print in the second half of 2020. However, the print debut never eventuated and Prada exited his position in 2021.

In September 2022 Daria Veledeeva (formerly editor-in-chief of Russian Harper's Bazaar from 2009 to 2022) was appointed editor-in-chief of the magazine, Marc Ascoli (formerly of AnOther and Yohji Yamamoto) was appointed as executive creative director, and Sissy Vian (formerly of Vogue Italia and Vogue Japan) was appointed to the role of creative fashion director. Harper's Bazaar Italia returned to print in December 2022, six print issues were published in 2023 and ten print issues a year from 2024.

Lee Swillingham and Stuart Spalding were appointed to the position of executive creative directors in 2024, replacing Marc Ascoli. Stefano Tonchi (formerly of W and L'Officiel) was then appointed to the role of editorial director in May 2024. Followed by the resignation of Veledeeva in July, she was replaced by Massimo Russo, Veledeeva moved into the role of editor-at-large.

M/M Paris (Michael Amzalag and Mathias Augustyniak) were appointed executive creative directors in April 2025, the first issue under their direction was September 2025.

In November 2026 it was announced that Giovanni Audiffredi would replace Massimo Russo as editor-in-chief from January 2027.

== See also ==
- List of Harper's Bazaar Italia cover models
- Harper's Bazaar, American edition in publication since 1867
