= List of Vogue Russia cover models =

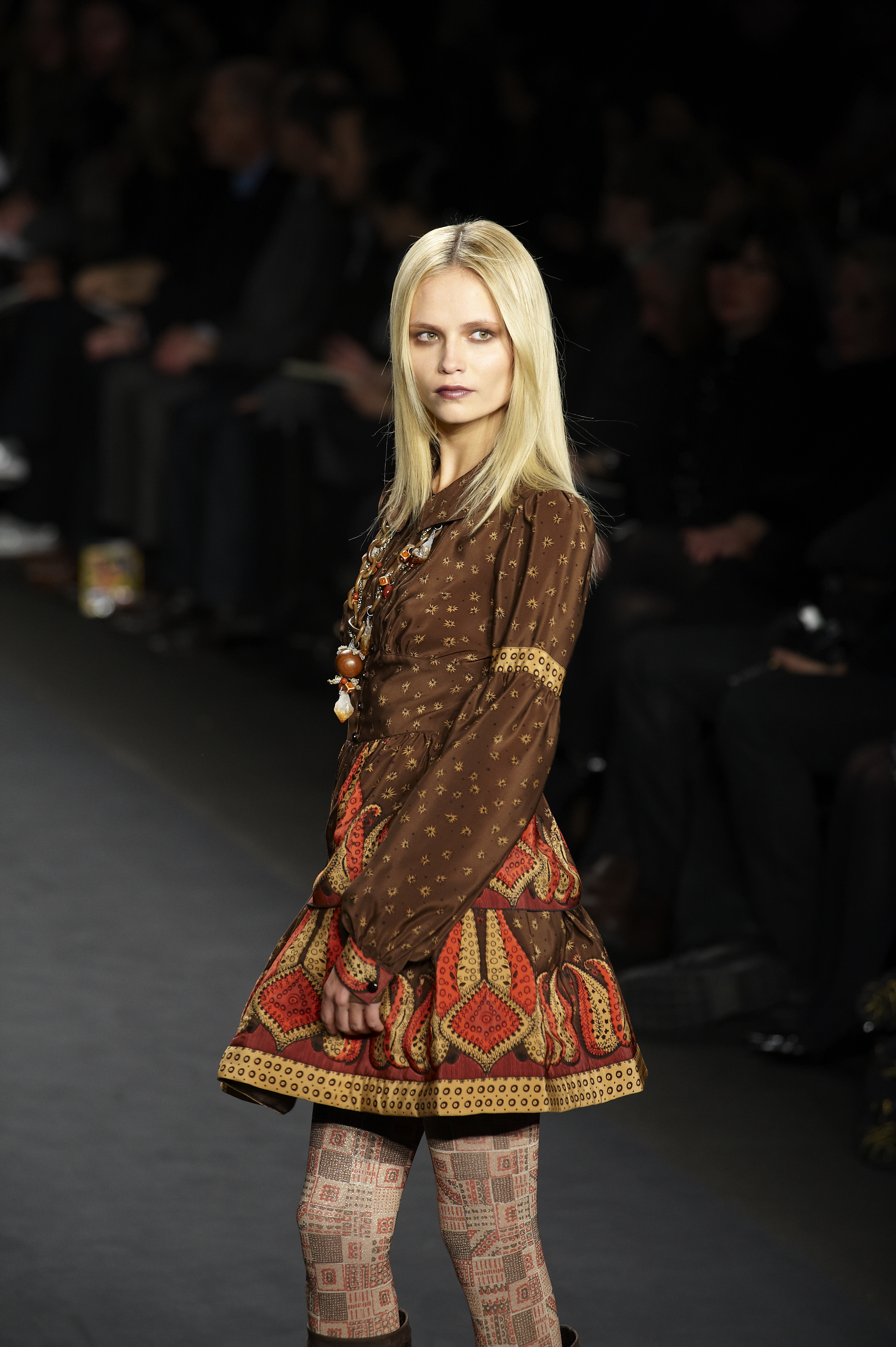
Natasha Poly is the most covered model of Vogue Russia with 15 covers (2004–2020)

This list of Vogue Russia cover models is a catalog of cover models who have appeared on the cover of Vogue Russia, the Russian edition of Vogue magazine, starting with the magazine's first issue in September 1998.

== 1990s ==
=== 1998 ===
Issue	Cover model	Photographer
September	Amber Valletta & Kate Moss	Mario Testino
October	Jaime King	Neil Kirk
November	Kristina Semenovskaya	Axel Bernstorff
December/January 1999	Hanli van Heerden & Hedvig Maria Maigre	Kelly Klein

=== 1999 ===
Issue	Cover model	Photographer
February	Elizabeth Hurley	Michael Thompson
March	Lida Egorova	Arthur Elgort
April	Alla Pugacheva	Robin Derrick
May	Natalia Semanova	Pascal Chevallier
June	Onega Ponomarenko; Olga Otrohova; Irina Bondarenko; Natalia Boykova; Tatiana Zavjalova; Alexandra Egorova	Kelly Klein
July/August	Georgina Grenville	Steven Meisel
September	Natalia Semanova	Arthur Elgort
October	Liv Tyler	Regan Cameron
November	Stella Tennant	Thomas Schenk
December/January 2000	–	–

== 2000s ==
=== 2000 ===
Issue	Cover model	Photographer
February	Gisele Bündchen	Mario Testino
March	Raquel Zimmermann & Jessica Miller	Duc Liao
April	Erin O'Connor	Thomas Schenk
May	Milla Jovovich	Warwick Saint
June	Anna Kournikova	Bill Ling
July/August	Adi Neumann	Enrique Badulescu
September	Naomi Campbell	Robin Derrick
October	Kristina Tsirekidze	Duc Liao
November	Mariana Weickert	Blaise Reuersward
December/January 2001	Liberty Ross	Robin Derrick

=== 2001 ===
Issue	Cover model	Photographer
February	Aynur Rustambekova	Vladimir Fridkes
March	Catherine Hurley	Rasmus Morgensen
April	Danita Angell	Phillippe Cometti
May	Aynur Rustambekova	Vladimir Fridkes
June	Kate Moss	Mario Testino
July/August	Katarina Scola	Arthur Elgort
September	Mariacarla Boscono	Lee Jenkins
October	Carmen Kass	Nicolas Moore
November	Linda Evangelista	Steven Meisel
December	Karolína Kurková	Blaise Reutersward

=== 2002 ===
Issue	Cover model	Photographer
January	Sarah McNeilly	Christophe Meimoon
February	Karolína Kurková	Steven Klein
March	Clara Veiga Gazinelli	Blaise Reutersward
April	Irina Bondarenko	Max Vadukul
May	Karolína Kurková; Liya Kebede; Carmen Kass	Mario Testino
June	Karolína Kurková	Mario Testino
July	Jake Rachal & Kate Davis	Pablo Alfaro
August	Eugenia Volodina	Ewa-Marie Rundqvist
September	Jeísa Chiminazzo	Max Vadukul
October	Alzbeta O'Connor	Pablo Alfaro
November	Tetyana Brazhnyk	Ewa-Marie Rundqvist
December	Dewi Driegen	John Akehurst

=== 2003 ===
Issue	Cover model	Photographer
January	Liberty Ross	Todd Barry
February	Natalia Vodianova	Sean Cunningham
March	Diána Mészáros	Alexei Hay
April	Natalia Vodianova & Tetyana Brazhnyk	Robert Fairer
May	Anne Vyalitsyna	Robert Fairer
June	Katarina Scola	Ewa-Marie Rundqvist
July	Brigitte Swidrak	Alexei Hay
August	Brigitte Swidrak	Harri Peccinotti
September	Alyssa Sutherland & Kirsten Varley	Harri Peccinotti & Vadim Piskarev
October	Caroline Winberg	John Akehurst
November	Renata Litvinova	Peter Farago
December	Deanna Miller	Oliviero Toscani

=== 2004 ===
Issue	Cover model	Photographer
January	Polina Kouklina	John Akehurst
February	Aiste Miseviciute	Stratis & Beva
March	Jenny Harper	Matthias Vriens-McGrath
April	Eugenia Volodina	Karl Lagerfeld
May	Caroline Trentini	Marco La Conte
June	Polina Kouklina	Oliviero Toscani
July	Micki Olin	Koto Bolofo
August	Susan Eldridge	Alexei Hay
September	Natasha Poly	Karl Lagerfeld
October	Lina Salomonsson & Laura Kepshire	Koto Bolofo
November	Hana Soukupová	Karl Lagerfeld
December	Ingeborga Dapkūnaitė	Koto Bolofo

=== 2005 ===
Issue	Cover model	Photographer
January	Polina Kouklina	Nicolas Moore
February	Kim Noorda	Satoshi Saïkusa
March	Anne Vyalitsyna	James Macari
April	Julia Stegner	Satoshi Saïkusa
May	Elizabeth Hurley	Sofia Sanchez & Mauro Mongiello
June	Magdelay Bellon	Greg Lotus
July	Jeísa Chiminazzo	Lee Broomfield
August	Morgane Dubled	Jeff Bark
September	Hannelore Knuts	Jason Schmidt
October	Anne-Marie van Dijk	Richard Bush
November	Ilona Kuodiene	Greg Lotus
December	Tasha Tilberg	Jeff Bark

=== 2006 ===
Issue	Cover model	Photographer
January	Lindsay Ellingson	David Slijper
February	Nastia Gorshkova	Alex Cayley
March	Elena Baguci	Sofia Sanchez & Mauro Mongiello
April	Cameron Russell	Lee Broomfield
May	Jorgelina Airaldi	Liz Collins
June	Tanya Dziahileva	Lee Broomfield
July	Cameron Russell	Anthony Ward
August	Anne-Marie van Dijk	James Macari
September	Tanya Dziahileva	Lee Broomfield
October	Franziska Frank	Anthony Ward
November	Claudia Merikula	Liz Collins
December	Querelle Jansen	Sofia Sanchez & Mauro Mongiello

=== 2007 ===
Issue	Cover model	Photographer
January	Valentina Zelyaeva	Lee Broomfield
February	Behati Prinsloo	Liz Collins
March	Claudia Schiffer	Lee Broomfield
April	Naomi Campbell	Miguel Reveriego
May	Edita Vilkevičiūtė	Miguel Reveriego
June	Eugenia Mandzhieva	KT Auleta
July	Eugenia Volodina	Chad Pitman
August	Sasha Pivovarova	Miguel Reveriego
September	Natasha Poly	Miguel Reveriego
October	Devon Aoki	Miguel Reveriego
November	Cindy Crawford	Miguel Reveriego
December	Valentina Zelyaeva	Miguel Reveriego

=== 2008 ===
Issue	Cover model	Photographer
January	Meghan Collison	Terry Tsiolis
February	Tanya Dziahileva	Miguel Reveriego
March	Natalia Vodianova	Steven Meisel
April	Sasha Pivovarova	Terry Tsiolis
May	Masha Novoselova	Miguel Reveriego
June	Maryna Linchuk	Terry Tsiolis
July	Natasha Poly	Mario Sorrenti
August	Natasha Poly	Terry Richardson
September	Anna Selezneva	Mario Testino
October	Raquel Zimmermann	Terry Tsiolis
November	Alana Zimmer	Tom Munro
December	Naomi Campbell	Mert & Marcus

=== 2009 ===
Issue	Cover model	Photographer
January	Toni Garrn	Tom Munro
February	Victoria Beckham	Sølve Sundsbø
March	Natasha Poly	Alasdair McLellan
April	Carmen Kass & Lenny Kravitz	Terry Tsiolis
May	Magdalena Frackowiak	Tom Munro
June	Natalia Vodianova	Alasdair McLellan
July	Snejana Onopka	Terry Tsiolis
August	Dree Hemingway	Alasdair McLellan
September	Kate Moss	Sølve Sundsbø
October	Tori Praver	Matt Irwin
November	Daria Werbowy	Terry Richardson
December	Claudia Schiffer	Sølve Sundsbø

== 2010s ==
=== 2010 ===
Issue	Cover model	Photographer
January	Natasha Poly	Sølve Sundsbø
February	Magdalena Frackowiak	Tom Munro
March	Abbey Lee Kershaw	Josh Olins
April	Naomi Campbell	Steven Meisel
May	Anabela Belikova	Tom Munro
June	Doutzen Kroes	Terry Richardson
July	Mariacarla Boscono	Sharif Hamza
August	Laetitia Casta	Matt Irwin
September	Natalia Vodianova	Mert & Marcus
October	Natasha Poly	Terry Richardson
November	Anja Rubik	Sølve Sundsbø
December	Jessica Stam	Greg Kadel

=== 2011 ===
Issue	Cover model	Photographer
January	Alina Kabaeva	Vladimir Glynin
February	Anja Rubik & Sasha Knezevic	Alexi Lubomirski
March	Constance Jablonski	Alexi Lubomirski
April	Abbey Lee Kershaw	Hedi Slimane
May	Maryna Linchuk	Patrick Demarchelier
June	Anna Selezneva	Mariano Vivanco
July	Lara Stone	Mark Seliger
August	Daria Strokous	Mariano Vivanco
September	Natasha Poly	Hedi Slimane
October	Daria Werbowy	Terry Richardson
November	Adam Levine & Anne Vyalitsyna	Alix Malka
December	Arizona Muse	Hedi Slimane

=== 2012 ===
Issue	Cover model	Photographer
January	Lily Cole	Anthony Maule
February	Anais Pouliot; Kate King; Ming Xi	Patrick Demarchelier
March	Iselin Steiro	Hedi Slimane
April	Daphne Groeneveld	Hedi Slimane
May	Maryna Linchuk	Alexi Lubomirski
June	Natalia Vodianova	Cüneyt Akeroğlu
July	Lily Donaldson	Richard Bush
August	Natasha Poly	Ellen von Unwerth
September	Natalia Vodianova	Mario Testino
October	Scarlett Johansson	Victor Demarchelier
November	Arizona Muse	Richard Bush
December	Linda Evangelista	Karl Lagerfeld

=== 2013 ===
Issue	Cover model	Photographer
January	Lara Stone	Hedi Slimane
February	Saskia de Brauw	Paolo Roversi
March	Suvi Koponen	Hedi Slimane
April	Joan Smalls	Richard Bush
May	Natasha Poly	Patrick Demarchelier
June	Dasha Zhukova	Patrick Demarchelier
July	Anja Rubik	Richard Bush
August	Karmen Pedaru	Knoepfel & Indlekofer
September	Sasha Pivovarova	Mert & Marcus
October	Daria Werbowy	Willy Vanderperre
November	Daria Strokous	Patrick Demarchelier
December	Maryna Linchuk	Vincent Peters

=== 2014 ===
Issue	Cover model	Photographer
January	Sasha Luss	Patrick Demarchelier
February	Anna Selezneva	Hans Feurer
March	Anja Rubik	Patrick Demarchelier
April	Nadja Bender	Mariano Vivanco
May	Catherine McNeil	Mariano Vivanco
June	Arizona Muse	Richard Bush
July	Sam Rollinson	Jason Kibbler
August	Isabeli Fontana	Terry Tsiolis
September	Lindsey Wixson	Alexi Lubomirski
October	Karlie Kloss	Patrick Demarchelier
November	Dasha Gold; Kate Grigorieva; Anya Lyagoshina	Patrick Demarchelier
December	Natalia Vodianova	Paolo Roversi

=== 2015 ===
Issue	Cover model	Photographer
January	Georgia May Jagger	Ellen von Unwerth
February	Saskia de Brauw	Patrick Demarchelier
March	Valery Kaufman	Patrick Demarchelier
April	Natasha Poly	Txema Yeste
May	Emily DiDonato	Mariano Vivanco
June	Catherine McNeil	Alexi Lubomirski
July	Lindsey Wixson	Ellen von Unwerth
August	Daphne Groeneveld	Jason Kibbler
September	Natasha Poly	Patrick Demarchelier
October	Nastya Sten & Sasha Luss	Txema Yeste
November	Ondria Hardin	Mariano Vivanco
December	Sasha Luss	Alexi Lubomirski

=== 2016 ===
Issue	Cover model	Photographer
January	Cuba Tornado Scott	Michel Comte
February	Suvi Koponen	Sebastian Kim
March	Grace Hartzel	Patrick Demarchelier
April	Maartje Verhoef	Txema Yeste
May	Karlie Kloss	Mariano Vivanco
June	Adèle Exarchopoulos	Patrick Demarchelier
July	Valery Kaufman	Sebastian Kim
August	Willow Hand	Mariano Vivanco
September	Irina Shayk	Mert & Marcus
October	Rianne van Rompaey	Patrick Demarchelier
November	Odette & Lia Pavlova	Patrick Demarchelier
December	Ellie Bamber	Patrick Demarchelier

=== 2017 ===
Issue	Cover model	Photographer
January	Doutzen Kroes	Patrick Demarchelier
February	Haley Bennett	Patrick Demarchelier
March	Irina Shayk	Luigi & Iango
April	Grace Elizabeth	Paola Kudacki
May	Kris Grikaite	Ben Weller
June	Natasha Poly	Txema Yeste
July	Yasmin Wijnaldum	Peter Ash Lee
August	Birgit Kos	Olivier Zahm
September	Natalia Vodianova	Giampaolo Sgura
October	Kris Grikaite & Kirill Sokolovski	Patrick Demarchelier
November	Marine Vacth	Emma Tempest
December	Mica Argañaraz	Patrick Demarchelier

=== 2018 ===
Issue	Cover model	Photographer
January	Lady Jean Campbell	Matteo Montanari
February	Grace Hartzel	Patrick Demarchelier
March	Luna Bijl	Luigi & Iango
April	Grace Elizabeth	Giampaolo Sgura
May	Frederikke Sofie	Txema Yeste
June	Fyodor Smolov; Julian Draxler; Natalia Vodianova; Dani Alves	Luigi & Iango
July	Lily-Rose Depp	Boo George
August	Faretta	Olivier Zahm
September	Natasha Poly; Natalia Vodianova; Irina Shayk	Giampaolo Sgura
October	Sasha Luss	Olivier Zahm
November	Sasha Pivovarova	Emma Summerton
December	Renata Litvinova	Gosha Rubchinskiy

=== 2019 ===
Issue	Cover model	Photographer
January	Kris Grikaite	Chris Colls
February	Birgit Kos	Giampaolo Sgura
March	Bella Hadid	Giampaolo Sgura
April	Grace Elizabeth	Yelena Yemchuk
May	Kendall Jenner	Luigi & Iango
June	Imaan Hammam	Chris Colls
July	Stella Lucia	Carlijn Jacobs
August	Cara Taylor	Giampaolo Sgura
September	Sara Grace Wallerstedt	Emma Tempest
September	Karen Elson	Alexander Saladrigas
September	Kiki Willems	Quentin de Briey
October	Veronika Kunz	Giampaolo Sgura
November	Abbey Lee Kershaw	Chris Colls
December	Irina Shayk; Stella Maxwell	Zoey Grossman

== 2020s ==
=== 2020 ===
Issue	Cover model	Photographer
January	Claudia Schiffer	Cüneyt Akeroğlu
February	Gigi Hadid	Zoey Grossman
March	Kris Grikaite	Giampaolo Sgura
March	Maike Inga	Giampaolo Sgura
April	Natasha Poly	Claudia Knoepfel
May	Hiandra Martinez	Txema Yeste
June	Sasha Pivovarova (Illustration)	Sasha Pivovarova (self-portrait)
June	Steinberg (Illustration)	Steinberg (self-portrait)
July	Lou Doillon	Pierre-Ange Carlotti
August	Vilma Sjöberg	Camilla Åkrans
September	—	Erik Bulatov (Illustration)
September	Irina Shayk	Paola Kudacki
October	Grace Elizabeth	Carin Backoff
November	Lulu Tenney	Giampaolo Sgura
December	Simona Kust	Vito Fernicola
December	Steinberg	Vito Fernicola

=== 2021 ===
Issue	Cover model	Photographer
January	Edie Campbell	Louie Banks
February	Lola Nicon & Freek Iven	Giampaolo Sgura
March	Irina Shayk	Arseny Jabiev
March	Natalia Vodianova	Elizaveta Porodina
March	Tanya Churbanova	Yan Yugay
April	Lady Jean Campbell	Camilla Akrans
May	Simona Kust	Emmie America
June	Carolyn Murphy	Alexander Saldarigas
July	Natasja Madsen	Henrik Purienne
August	Mariacarla Boscono	Camilla Akrans
September	Anouck Lepère & Daria Rodionva	Joan Braun Yan Yguay
October	Abby Champion, Cara Taylor, Hiandra Martinez, Selena Forrest & Ugbad Abdi	Christian MacDonald
November	Jill Kortleve	Sonia Szóstak
December	Kate Moss	Luigi & Iango

=== 2022 ===
Issue	Cover model	Photographer
January	Vilma Sjöberg	Txema Yeste
February	Daria Koshkina	Arsney Jabiev
March	Michaela Stark	Lea Colombo
