= List of Russian fashion models =

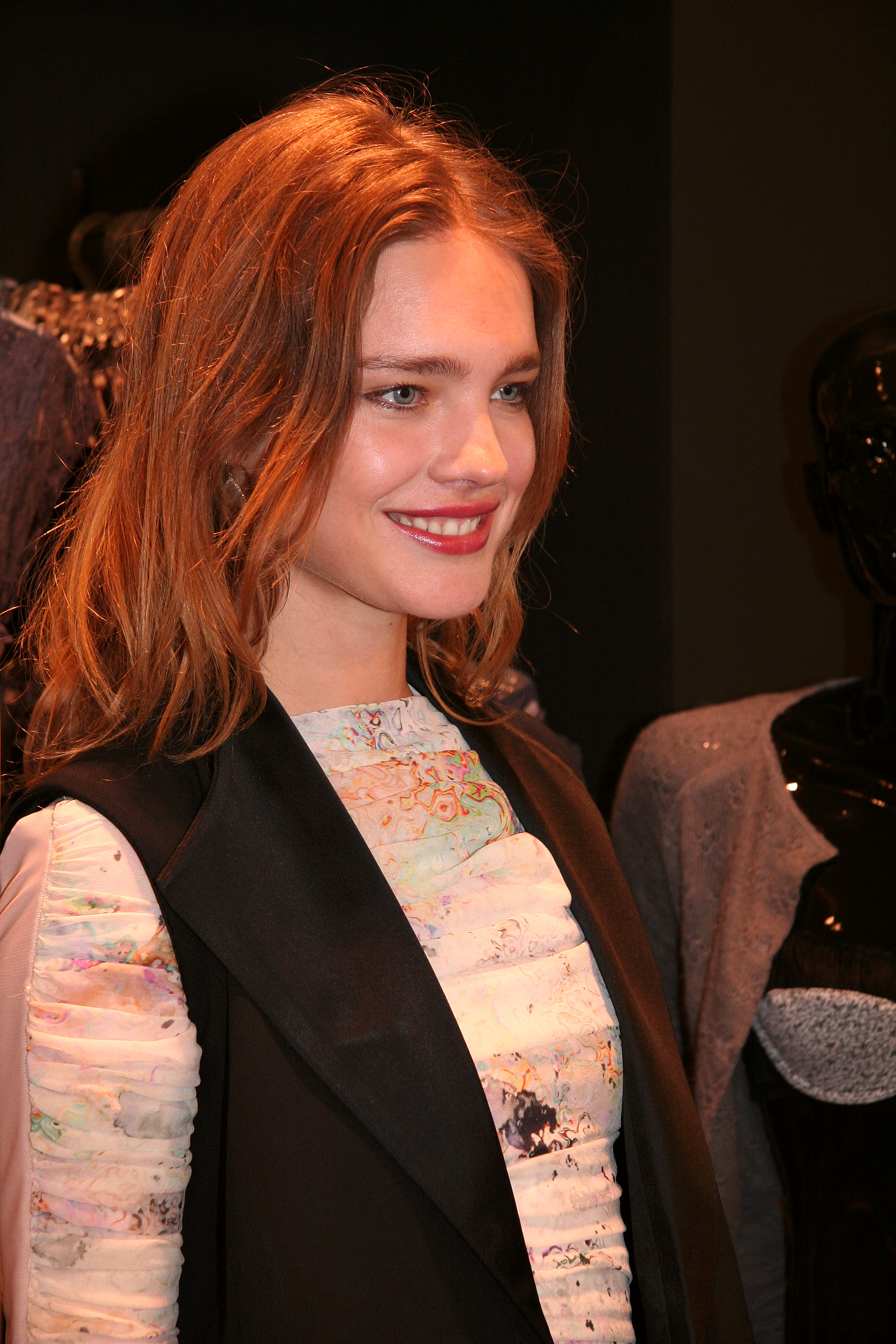
Natalia Vodianova

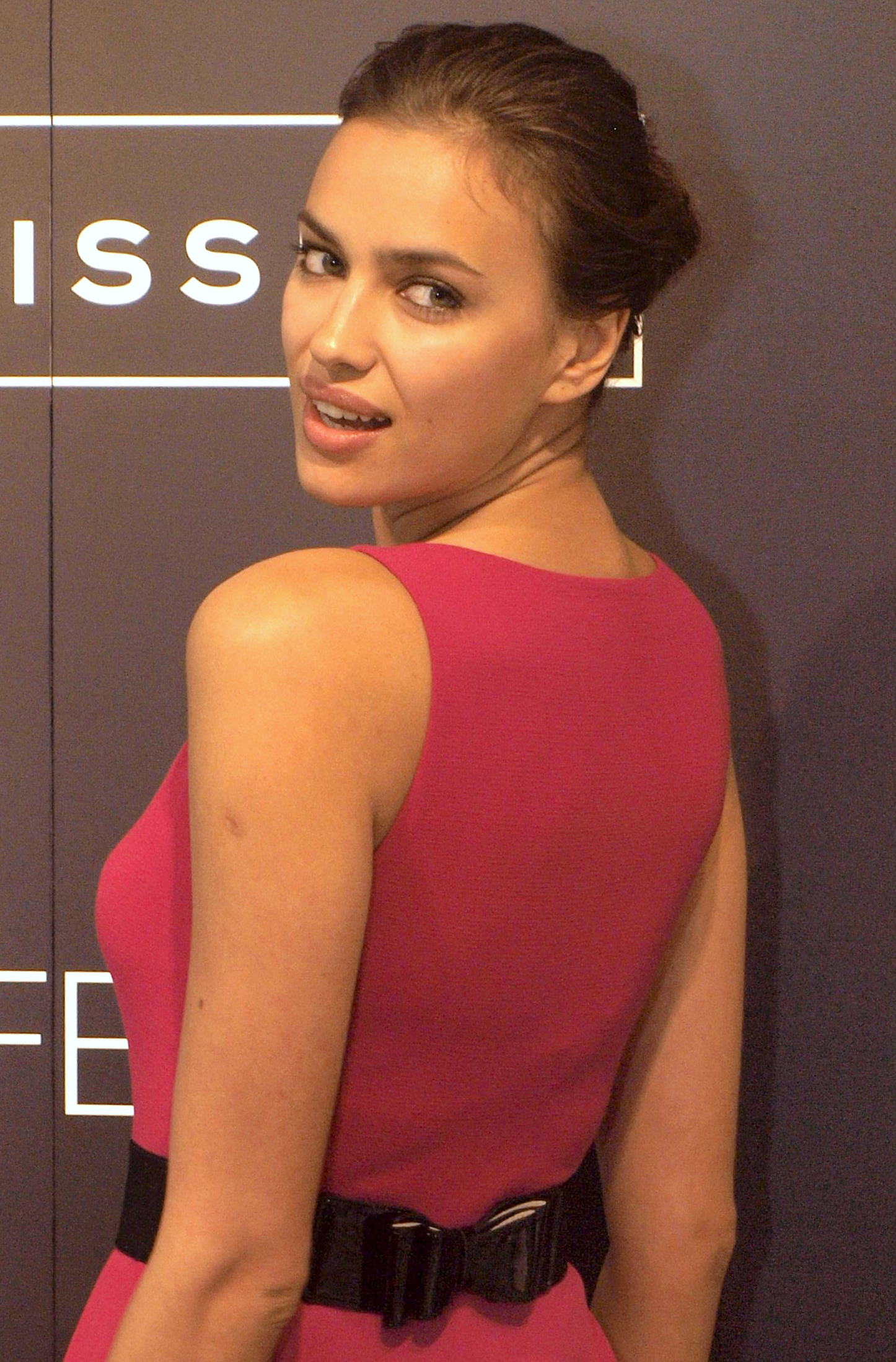
Irina Shayk

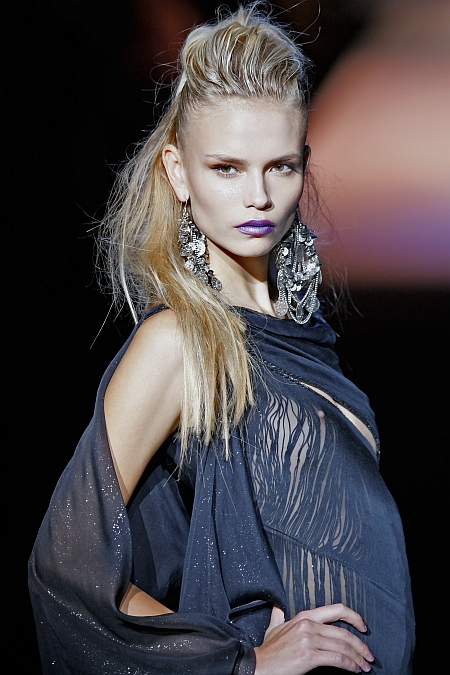
Natasha Poly

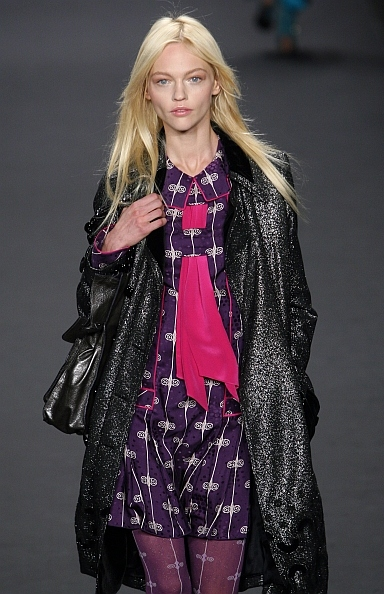
Sasha Pivovarova

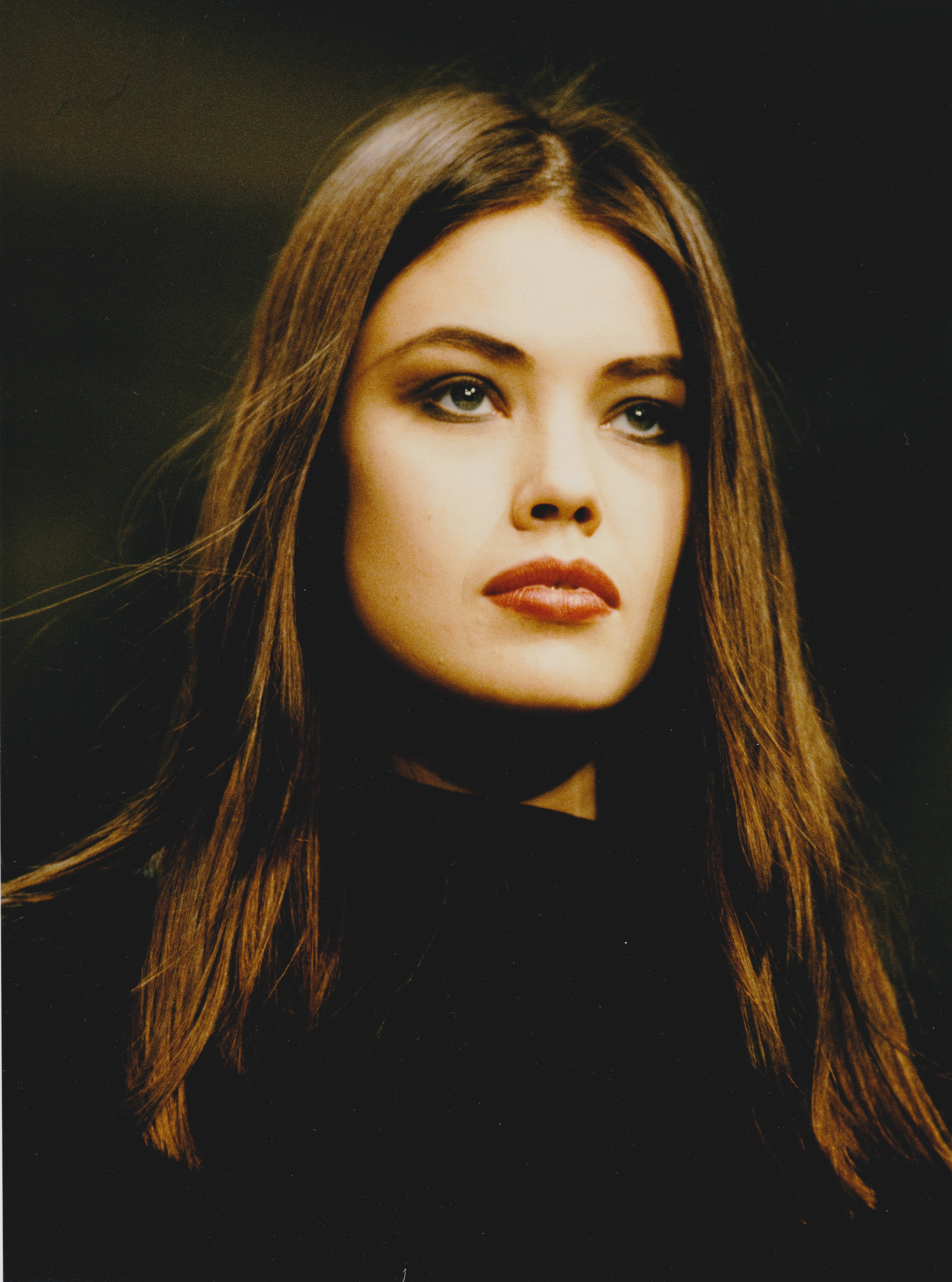
Tatiana Sorokko

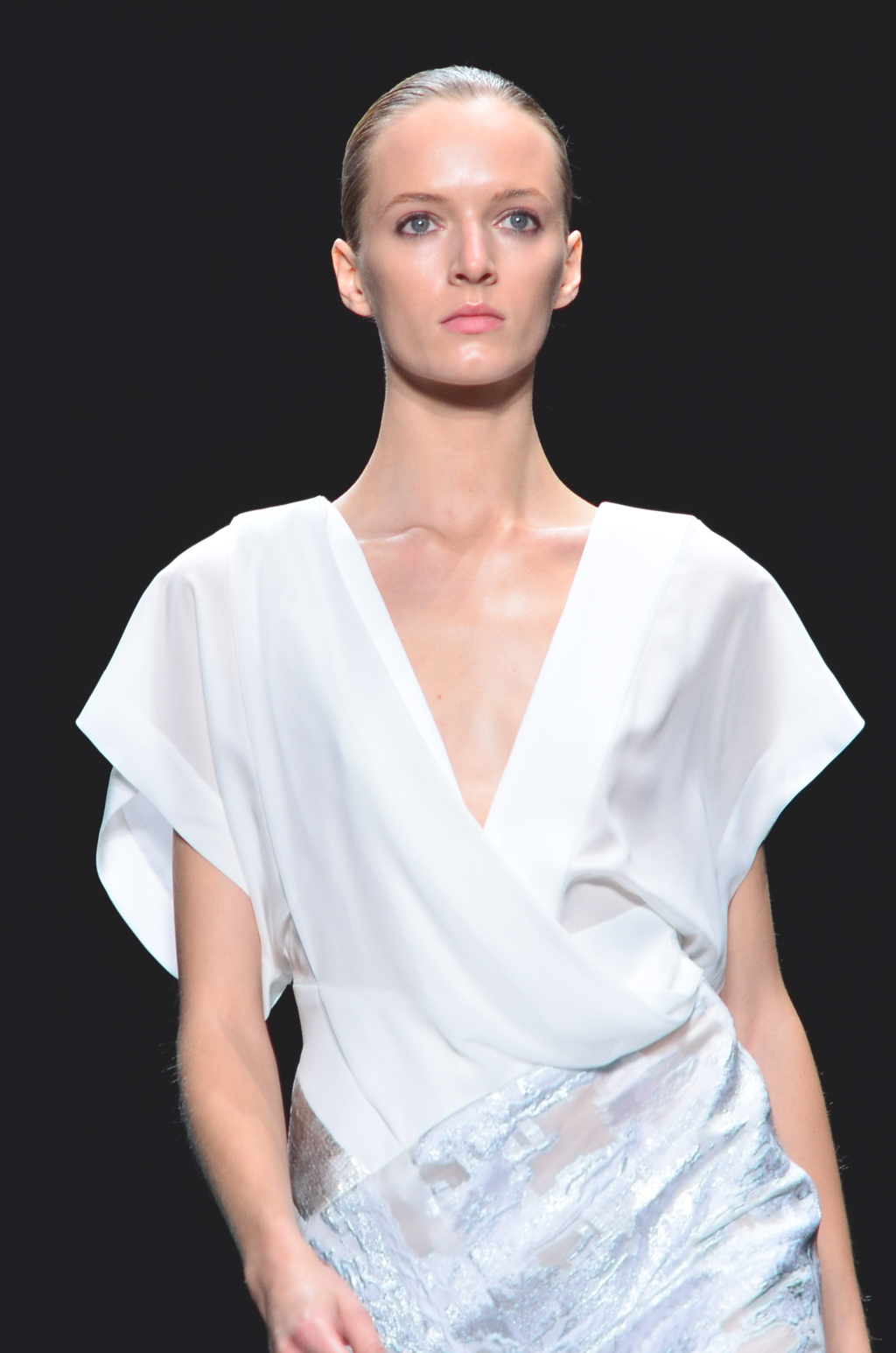
Daria Strokous

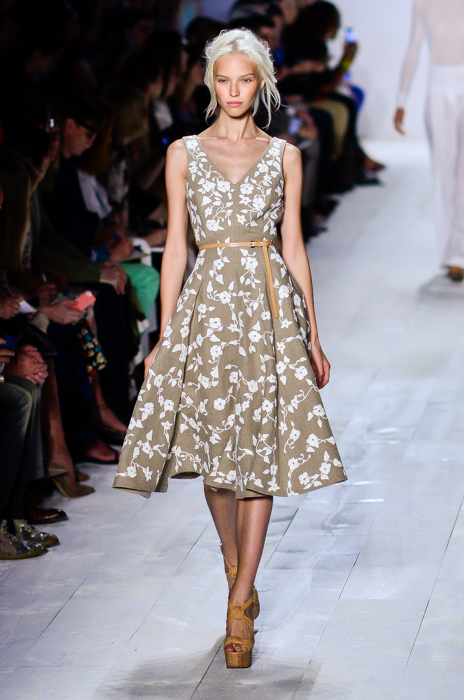
Sasha Luss

This is a list of the most successful Russian fashion models.

== 1990s ==
Models who started their modeling careers in the 1990s:

- Anastasia Khozisova
- Irina Pantaeva
- Tatiana Sorokko
- Inna Zobova

== 2000s ==
Models who started their modeling careers in the 2000s:

- Anna Barsukova
- Natalie Glebova
- Ksenia Kahnovich
- Tatiana Kovylina
- Irina Kulikova
- Eugenia Mandzhieva
- Elena Melnik
- Ranya Mordanova
- Masha Novoselova
- Colette Pechekhonova
- Sasha Pivovarova
- Natasha Poly
- Vlada Roslyakova
- Anna Selezneva
- Irina Shayk
- Katya Shchekina
- Daria Strokous
- Tatiana Usova
- Natalia Vodianova
- Eugenia Volodina
- Anne Vyalitsyna

== 2010s ==
Models who started their modeling careers in the 2010s:

- Kate Grigorieva
- Tatiana Kotova
- Sasha Luss
- Lia Pavlova
- Odette Pavlova
- Kristina Romanova
- Vita Sidorkina
- Nastya Sten
