= List of Vogue Thailand cover models =

This list of Vogue Thailand cover models (2013–present) is a catalog of cover models who have appeared on the cover of Vogue Thailand, the Thai edition of American fashion magazine Vogue.

== 2010s ==
=== 2013 ===
Issue	Cover model	Photographer
February	Si Phitsinee Tanwiboon Bee Namthip	Hans Feurer
March	Małgosia Bela	David Bellemere
April	Coco Rocha	David Bellemere
May	Anais Pouliot	David Bellemere
June	Carolyn Murphy	Lincoln Pilcher
July	Karlie Kloss	David Bellemere
August	Kasia Struss	David Bellemere
September	Aum Patcharapa	Tada Varich
October	Liu Wen	Marcin Tyszka
November	Naomi Campbell	Marcin Tyszka
December	Isabeli Fontana	Marcin Tyszka

=== 2014 ===
Issue	Cover model	Photographer
January	Eva Herzigová	Marcin Tyszka
February	Aline Weber	Nat Prakobsantisuk
March	Davika Hoorne	Nat Prakobsantisuk
April	Iris Strubegger	Simon Cave
May	Kendra Spears	Marcin Tyszka
June	Zuzanna Bijoch	Marcin Tyszka
July	Metinee Kingpayom	Tada Varich
August	Martha Hunt	David Bellemere
September	Hana Jiříčková	David Bellemere
October	Yaya Urassaya	Marcin Tyszka
November	Meghan Collison	Marcus Ohlsson
December	Georgia May Jagger	Marcin Tyszka

=== 2015 ===
Issue	Cover model	Photographer
January	Khemanit Jamikorn	Tada Varich
February	Zuzanna Bijoch	Nat Prakobsantisuk
March	Karen Elson	Marcin Tyszka
April	Praya Lundberg	Tada Varich
May	Sui He	Stockton Johnson
June	Gisele Bündchen	Mario Testino
July	Janjira Jujang; Chermarn Boonyasak; Yada Villaret	Nat Prakobsantisuk
August	Devon Windsor	Yu Tsai
September	Suki Waterhouse	Marcin Tyszka
October	Davika Hoorne	Marcin Tyszka
November	Amanda Wellsh	Yu Tsai
December	Miranda Kerr	Russell James

=== 2016 ===
Issue	Cover model	Photographer
January	Chrissy Teigen	Yu Tsai
February	Anna Selezneva	Nat Prakobsantisuk
March	Daphne Groeneveld	Natth Jaturapahu
April	Behati Prinsloo	Russell James
May	Weir Sukollawat & Luping Wang	Tada Varich
June	Princess Sirivannavari	Nat Prakobsantisuk
July	Rosie Huntington-Whiteley	Russell James
August	Karmen Pedaru	Marcin Tyszka
September	Alisa Ahmann; Annika Krijt; Julia van Os	Natth Jaturapahu
October	Hollie-May Saker	John-Paul Pietrus
November	Woranut Bhirombhakdi	Wasan Puengprasert
December	Mia Stass	Marco Bertani

=== 2017 ===
Issue	Cover model	Photographer
January	Bee Namthip	Tada Varich
February	Daphne Groeneveld	Nat Prakobsantisuk
March	Lily Aldridge	Russell James
April	Kate Upton	Yu Tsai
May	Lexi Boling	Natth Jaturapahu
June	Tata Young	Nat Prakobsantisuk
July	Issa Lish	Natth Jaturapahu
August	Yaya Urassaya	Mark Vassallo
September	Martha Hunt; Jacquelyn Jablonski; Hannah Ferguson; Hilary Rhoda; Maria Borges	Russell James
October	Lorena Maraschi & Lina Hoss	John-Paul Pietrus
November	Bee Namthip	Tada Varich
December	Emily DiDonato	Natth Jaturapahu

=== 2018 ===
Issue	Cover model	Photographer
January	Stella Maxwell	Yu Tsai
February	Princess Sirivannavari	Wasan Pruengprasert
March	Vanessa Moody	Nat Prakobsantisuk
April	Karlie Kloss	Russell James
May	Grace Hartzel	Natth Jaturapahu
June	Ranee Campen	Tada Varich
July	Sara Sampaio; Toni Garrn	Yu Tsai
August	Cameron Russell	Yu Tsai
September	Sasha Pivovarova	Natth Jaturapahu
October	Gemma Ward	Wasan Puengprasert
November	Natapohn Tameeruks	Joseph Degbadjo
December	Amanda Googe; HoYeon Jung; Eliza Kallmann; Sara Dijkink; Jan Baiboon	Nat Prakobsantisuk

=== 2019 ===
Issue	Cover model	Photographer
January	Yaya Urassaya	Joseph Degbadjo
February	Amanda Murphy	Tada Varich
March	Ruth Bell	Natth Jaturapahu
April	Madison Headrick	Sofia Sanchez & Mauro Mongiello
May	Davika Hoorne	Tada Varich
June	Princess Sirivannavari	Nat Prakobsantisuk
July	Kimberley Anne Woltemas	Elina Kechicheva
August	Liu Wen	Russell James
September	Gisele Fox & Sohyun Jung	Natth Jaturapahu
October	Opal Panisara Arayasakul	Nat Prakobsantisuk
November	Adesuwa Aighewi	Natth Jaturapahu
December	Sophie Koella	Natth Jaturapahu

== 2020s ==
=== 2020 ===
Issue	Cover model	Photographer
January	Urassaya Sperbund; BamBam; Mark Tuan	Tada Verich
February	Ansley Gulielmi	Nat Prakobsantisuk
March	Nyarach Abouch Ayuel; Jamily Wernke Meurer; Aaliyah Hydes; Qin Lei	Natth Jaturapahu
April	Davika Hoorne	Sootket Jiwpanit
May	Binx Walton	Angelo Pennetta
June	Meghan Collison	Natth Jaturapahu
July	Lauren Ernwein	Sofia Sanchez & Mauro Mongiello
August	Doutzen Kroes	Sunnery James
September	Nathalie Ducheine	Aekarat Ubonsri
October	Nittha Jirayungyurn	Aekarat Ubonsri
November	Àstrid Bergès-Frisbey	Leïla Smara
December	Jana Julius	Boo George

=== 2021 ===
Issue	Cover model	Photographer
January	Kimberley Anne Woltemas	Tada Verich
February	Abby Champion	Greg Swales
March	Irina Shayk	Morelli Brothers
April	Lily McMenamy	Boo George
May	Chrissy Teigen	Yu Tsai
June	Blossom Chananchida; Jiratchaya Sirimongkolnawin; Tawanwad Petchruenthong	Nat Prakobsantisuk
July	Lisa	Kim Hee June
August	Yasmin Wijnaldum	Morelli Brothers
September	Sara Grace Wallerstedt	Natth Jaturapahu
October	Nuttanicha Dungwattanawanich	Aekarat Ubonsri
November	Kimberley Anne Woltemas	Wasan Puengprasert
December	Mai Davika Hoorne	Sootket Jiwpanit

=== 2022 ===
Issue	Cover model	Photographer
January	Lily Collins	Alvaro Beamud Cortes
February	Yagal Nenna; Yada Villaret; Palmy Thitinan; Montra Rasa	Nat Prakobsantisuk
March	Urassaya Sperbund	Tada Varich
April	Praya Lundberg	Yu Tsai
May	Kimberly Ann Voltemas	Sukhet Jiwpanich
June	BamBam	Kim HeeJune
July	Baifern Pimchanok	Aekarat Ubonsri
August	Krating Khunnarong Pratesrat; Miriam Sornprommas; Tawan Kedkong	Wasan Puengprasert
September	Zoey Deutch; Jackson Wang	Thomas Whiteside; Nat Prakobsantisuk
October	Mai Davika Hoorne	Sootket Jiwpanit
November	Estelle Chen; Kanon Hirata; Maryel Uchida	Paul Scala
December	Grace Valentine	Natth Jaturapahu

=== 2023 ===
Issue	Cover model	Photographer
January	Kimberley Anne Woltemas	Sootket Jiwpanit
February	Jan Baiboon; Amrit; Kayako Higuchi	Luka Booth
March	Urassaya Sperbund; Nadech Kugimiya	Aekarat Ubonsri
April	Ranee Campen	Nat Prakobsantisuk
May	Jade Nguyen	Sofia Sanchez & Mauro Mongiello
June	Madelaine Petsch	Sofia Sanchez & Mauro Mongiello
July	Davika Hoorne	Sootket Jiwpanit
August	Bright Vachirawit Chivaaree	Sootket Jiwpanit
September	Alia Bhatt	Thomas Whiteside
October	Valentina Sampaio	Ricardo Abrahao
November	Whitney Peak	Amie Milne
December	Bow Maylada	Tada Varich

=== 2024 ===
Issue	Cover model	Photographer
January	Sarocha Chankimha; Rebecca Patricia Armstrong	Sootket Jiwpanit
February	Kimberley Anne Woltemas	Nat Prakobsantisuk
February	Thanapob Leeratanakachorn	Nat Prakobsantisuk
February	Jeff Satur	Nat Prakobsantisuk
March	Tilda Swinton	Harit Srikhao
April	Davika Hoorne	Aekarat Ubonsri
May	Ranee Campen	Sootket Jiwpanit
June	Baifern Pimchanok	Aekarat Ubonsri
June	Metawin Opas-iamkajorn	Aekarat Ubonsri
July	Anika Chatikavanij; Arthit Mikhail Romanyk; Est Supha Sangaworawong	Tada Varich
August	Daniel Lee; Vachirawit Chivaaree	Brianna Capozzi
September	Jan Baiboon	Aekarat Ubonsri
October	Nayeon	Mok Jungwook
November	Orm Kornnaphat, Lingling Sirilak	Nat Prakobsantisuk
December	Lisa	Jiyong Yoon

=== 2025 ===
Issue	Cover model	Photographer
January	Toei Supicha, Brea Umali, Kaci Beh, Suganya, Nguyễn Quỳnh Anh	Wasan Phungpraset
February	Sara Grace Wallerstedt	Aekarat Ubonsri
March	Marjan Jonkman	Damian Foxe
April	Jorin Khumpiraphan	Tada Varich
April	Milli	Tada Varich
May	Milk Vosbein, Love Pattranite	Nat Prakobsantisuk
June	Jan Baiboon	Aekarat Ubonsri
July	Chutimon Chuengcharoensukying	Sootket Jiwpanit
August	Sarocha Chankimha	Aekarat Ubonsri
September	Apo Nattawin Wattanagitiphat	Nat Prakobsantisuk
October	Plearnpichaya 'Juné' Komalarajun	Tada 'George' Varich
October	Tipnaree Weerawatnodom	Aekarat Ubonsri
October	Urassaya 'Yaya' Sperbund	Nat Prakobsantisuk
November	Jarinporn Joonkiat	Wasan Puengprasert
December	Sirilak Kwong	Tada Varich

=== 2026 ===
Issue	Cover model	Photographer
January	Liz Kennedy	Natth Jaturapahu
February	Kris Grikaite	Nat Prakobsantisuk
March	Urassaya Sperbund	Tada Varich
April	Faye Peraya	Sootket Jiwpanit
April	Emi Thasorn	Parkpuvin Thanachaibunyasilp
May	Namtan Tipnaree	Sootket Jiwpanit
June	Krit Amnuaydechkorn	Nat Prakobsantisuk
July	Kornnaphat Sethratanapong	Aekarat Ubonsri
August	Jeon Somi	Sinae Kim
September	Jan Baiboon	Sootket Jiwpanit
September	Toei Supicha	Sootket Jiwpanit
October	Tontawan Tantivejakul	Parkpuvin Thanachaibunyasilp
November	Lena Lalina Schuett, Miu Natsha Taechamongkalapiwat	Sootket Jiwpanit
