= Diana Galimullina =

Tatar fashion model

- Born: Aygul Galimullina
- Education: Kazan National Research Technical University
- Occupation: Fashion model
- Modeling information
- Height: 177 cm (5 ft 9.5 in)
- Hair color: Dark brown
- Eye color: Green

Aygul Galimullina, professionally known as Diana Galimullina, is a fashion model from Kazan, Republic of Tatarstan, Russia. Galimullina has made appearances at shows for brands including Genny, Elisabetta Franchi, Cushnie et Ochs, Elie Saab, Blumarine, Chanel, Versace, Vivienne Westwood, Givenchy, Giorgio Armani, Brandon Maxwell, Prabal Gurung, Philipp Plein, Scotch & Soda.

== Early life ==
At 16, she was booked to shoot for Vogue Russia as her first gig. When Vogue Russia came out, she signed with Next model agency worldwide (New York, Milan, and Paris).>

== Modeling career ==
Galimullina made her debut for fashion shows including Vivienne Westwood, Kenzo, and Calzedonia in 2013. Then in 2015, she began to work only for Christopher Kane and also closed the finale of his fashion show in London. After that, she signed with Women Management Worldwide (New York, Milan, and Paris).

After that, she worked with Donatella Versace for her Couture collection and archived to walk the Couture Versace show and ready-to-wear show.

Galimullina did a campaign for Versus Versace by Anthony Vaccarello. In addition, she also did the Versace Medusa bag campaign and Versace Home campaign. She was exclusive to the Givenchy by Ricardo Ticchi fashion show in Paris and other well-known models, including Bella Hadid, Irina Shayk, Mariacarla Boscono, and Natasha Poly. With that, she appeared in an Ermanno Scervino lingerie photoshoot. Then in 2019, Galimulina appeared in the Roberto Cavalli Sport campaign.

Galimullina has made appearances for fashion brands at several fashion shows that include Dolce & Gabbana, Genny, Elisabetta Franchi, Cushnie et Ochs, Elie Saab, Blumarine, Francesco Scognamiglio, Chanel, Versace, Givenchy, Giorgio Armani, Brandon Maxwell, Prabal Gurung, J. Mendel, Philipp Plein, Scotch & Soda, Christopher Kane, Moncler, John Richmond, Calzedonia, Y-3 by Yohji Yamamoto.

In 2019 she signed with Photogenics model agency in Los Angeles. As of 2022, she is working and living in Los Angeles, and also travels often to Europe for work and photoshoots.
