= Galimullin =

Galimullin (feminine:Galimullina) is a Tatar surname. It is an East Slavic-style patronymic surname derived from the given name Galimulla, a Tatar-language variant of Kaleemullah. Notable people with the surname include:

- Diana Galimullina (born 1994), Russian model
- Foat Galimullin (born 1941), a Soviet and Russian literary critic, professor
- Gulnaz Galimullina (born 1988), Tatar actress
- Iuliia Galimullina (born 2001), Russian racing cyclist
- Raisa Galimullina (1931–2000), Soviet, Kyrgyz, and Russian opera singer, professor
