= The Lions (agency) =

American modeling agency

The Lions Management
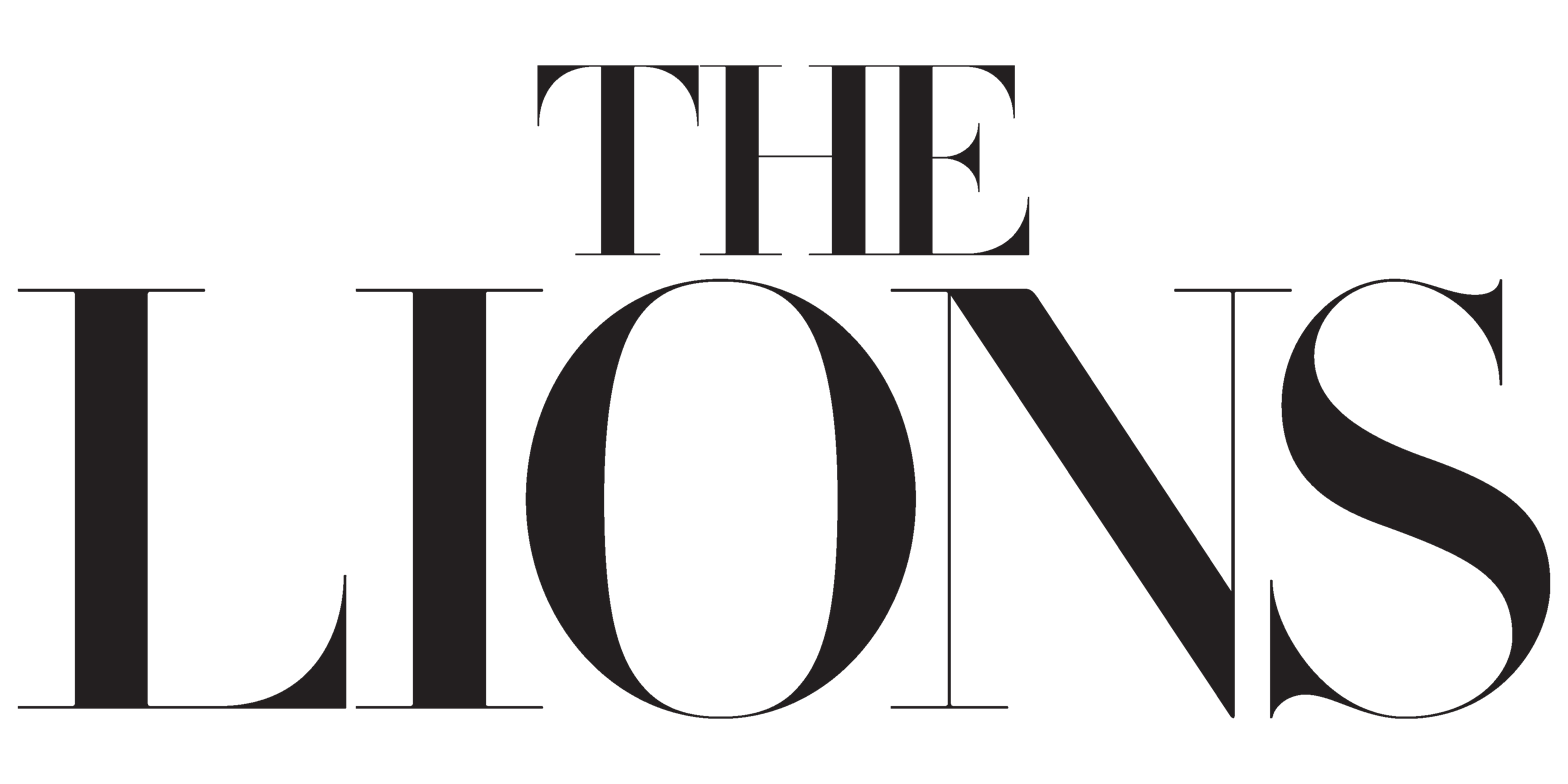
- Industry: Modeling agency
- Founded: 2014
- Headquarters: New York City, U.S.
- Key people: Julia Kisla (CEO); Ali Kavoussi (Managing Partner)
- Website: thelionsmanagement.com

The Lions Management (The Lions Model Management, LLC) is an American modeling agency based in New York City. The company was founded in 2014.

== Company history ==
In 2014, several models quit their agencies to form The Lions including Agyness Deyn, Karen Elson, and Cameron Russell from Elite Model Management; Jessica Hart, Anne Vyalitsyna and Angela Lindvall from Women Management; and Frankie Rayder from IMG Models. The transfers were mostly due to models following their agents to the new agency.

The Lions later restructured under the leadership of new managing partners Ali Kavoussi, Louie Chaban, and Christiana Tran with Julia Kisla serving as the agency's CEO.

A few years later, The Lions opened a division in Los Angeles in 2017. The office was headed by Charlotte Reiss, formerly of Wilhelmina Models, who served as its director. As a result of the COVID-19 pandemic, the company closed its Los Angeles branch and remains primarily based out of New York City. In 2020, the company tapped Julie O'Donnell, former director of Ford Models, to be one of its co-directors alongside Nancy Ortiz. The next year, in 2021, the agency began to shift from its primary strategy away from model management to include creative strategy and brand development. The agency was involved in producing advertising campaigns with Tamara Mellon and DHL.

== Talent ==
As of October 2026, The Lions represents these models:

- Frida Aasen
- Michelle Alves
- Alessandra Ambrósio
- Mariacarla Boscono
- Gracie Carvalho
- Sora Choi
- Anna Ewers
- Isabeli Fontana
- Magdalena Frąckowiak
- Toni Garrn
- Amelia Gray
- Kris Grikaite
- Daphne Groeneveld
- Elina Gunawardena
- Madison Headrick
- Eva Herzigová
- Jill Kortleve
- Tali Lennox
- Maryna Linchuk
- Stella Maxwell
- Kristen McMenamy
- Mayowa Nicholas
- Felice Noordhoff
- Soo Joo Park
- Natasha Poly
- Behati Prinsloo
- Frankie Rayder
- Coco Rocha
- Sara Sampaio
- Valentina Sampaio
- Daiane Sodre
- Iselin Steiro
- Lara Stone
- Candice Swanepoel
- Kate Upton
- Nataša Vojnović
- Anne Vyalitsyna
- Ming Xi

== See also ==
- List of modeling agencies
