= Tanya Diagileva =

Belarusian model (born 1991)

- Таня Дягилева; Таня Дзягілева
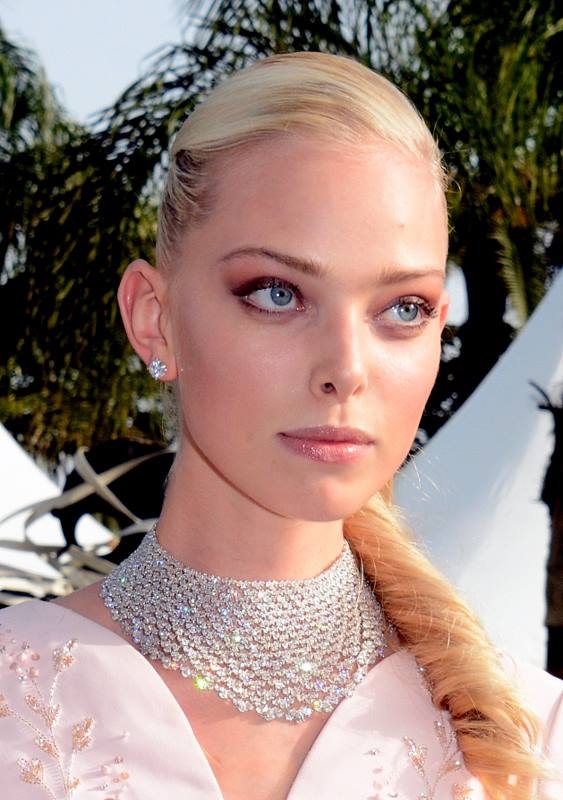
- Diagileva at the 2015 Cannes Film Festival
- Born: Tatiana Vladimirovna Diagileva; 4 June 1991 (age 35); Vitebsk, Byelorussian SSR, Soviet Union
- Other name: Tanya Dziahileva
- Occupation: Model
- Modeling information
- Height: 1.83 m (6 ft 0 in)
- Hair color: Blonde
- Eye color: Blue
- Agency: Monster Management (Milan, Madrid); Metro Models (Zurich)
- Website: tanyad.me

Tatiana "Tanya" Vladimirovna Diagileva (Note: Belarusian: Таццяна «Таня» Уладзіміраўна Дзягілева, romanized: Tatsiana "Tanya" Uladzimiraŭna Dziahileva; Russian: Татьяна «Таня» Владимировна Дягилева, romanized: Tatyana "Tanya" Vladimirovna Dyagileva.) (born 4 June 1991) is a Belarusian model.

== Career ==
=== Runway ===
Diagileva was discovered in 2002 at age 11 by Tigran Khachatrian of Noah Models. Khachatrian later sent Diagileva to Saint Petersburg to meet with scouts Jeni Rose and David Cunningham from IMG Models, who signed her to the agency in 2004. Their meeting was depicted in the French documentary film Searching Siberia (2006) by Emma Baus. Diagileva debuted in September 2005, during the Paris Fashion Week and Milan Fashion Week, landing an exclusive with Prada in Milan and booking top shows in Paris including Alexander McQueen, Chanel, and Chloé.

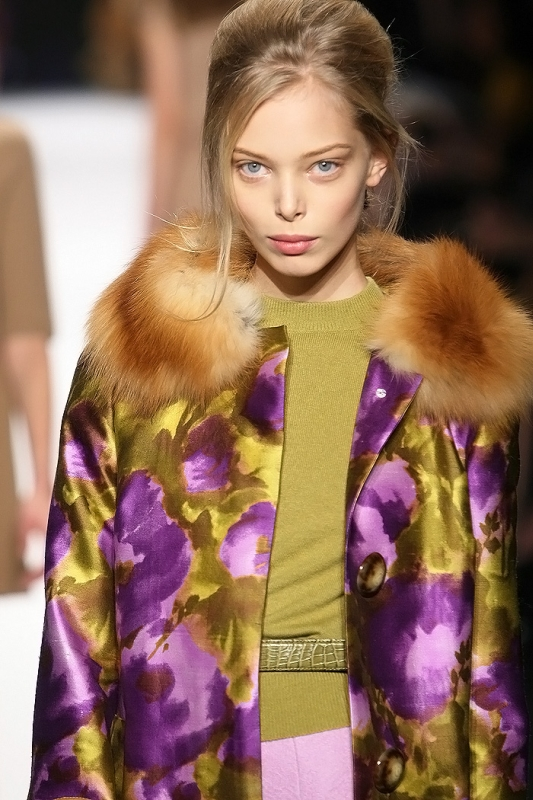
Diagileva for Michael Kors in February 2008

Shortly after, Diagileva was announced as one of the season's most wanted models. She was selected as one of the top newcomers of the season by models.com. During the spring 2008 season, she walked in 74 fashion shows opening the Versace show and closing four shows including Phillip Lim, Celine, and Valentino. In September 2008, Diagileva was featured in Women's Wear Daily (WWD) as an up-and-coming model to become a supermodel. Also known as Tanya D, she was named one of the most popular top models by Fashion TV. In 2007, she participated in nearly 150 fashion shows across the world. Since her first major season (spring 2006), Diagileva has walked the runway in ready-to-wear fashion shows and featured on the haute-couture catwalks for numerous world's top designers, including Chanel, Oscar de la Renta, Dior, Hermès, Alexander McQueen, Jean Paul Gaultier, Missoni, Versace, Prada, Donna Karan, and Calvin Klein.

=== Fashion magazine covers and editorials ===
Diagileva has appeared on the covers of Russian, Japanese, and Latin American Vogue, Russian and Spanish Harper's Bazaar, Korean and Swedish Elle, Japanese and Korean Numéro, Ukrainian L'Officiel, French Revue de Modes, Flair, Deutsch, and Tank. In September 2008, Vogue Russia featured Diagileva as a top model. She has featured in editorials for V, Numéro, i-D, Deutsch, Tank, Dansk, Harper's Bazaar, and American, Spanish, Chinese, Italian, German, British, Latin American, and Japanese Vogue magazines.

=== Ad campaigns ===
In spring 2006, Diagileva and Agyness Deyn have featured in a campaign for Hugo by Hugo Boss that proved to be one of the brand's most popular campaigns. Later, Diagileva landed a major solo campaign when she became the face of Yves Saint Laurent, photographed by Jürgen Teller. Following the two successful campaigns, she became the face for the fashion house of Jean-Paul Gaultier. In 2007, Steven Meisel photographed Diagileva for the campaign for Lanvin, and the next year Patrick Demarchelier photographed her for the BCBG Max Azria ad campaign. She has also landed many campaigns for brands such as Lacoste, Michael Kors, Christian Dior, DSquared², Hussein Chalayan, Celine, Nina Ricci, Escada Sport, Mango, Ralph Lauren, and Calvin Klein.
