= Frida Aasen =

Norwegian model

- Born: 5 December 1994 (age 30); Kristiansand, Norway
- Occupation: Model
- Years active: 2011–present
- Spouse: Tommy Chiabra (m. 2022)
- Modeling information
- Height: 1.78 m (5 ft 10 in)
- Hair color: Blonde
- Eye color: Blue
- Agency: The Lions (New York); Women Management (Paris); Monster Management (Milan); Select Model Management (London); View Management (Barcelona); Le Management (Copenhagen); Modellink (Gothenburg); Modelwerk (Hamburg)

Frida Aasen (born 5 December 1994) is a Norwegian model. She is best known for walking in the Victoria's Secret Fashion Show in 2017 and 2018.

== Early life ==
Aasen is from Kristiansand, a seaside city in Norway.

Aasen has won several ribbons in horseback riding competitions.

At the age of 14, Aasen was discovered by Donna Ioanna, a model agent, while she was shopping at a mall for Christmas presents. Her parents did not allow her to model until two years later.

== Career ==
In 2012, she was featured on the first edition of Carine Roitfeld's magazine CR Fashion Book.

In 2013, she was referred to as a face to watch by Vogue, alongside Martha Hunt and Kelly Gale.

She has appeared in adverts and catalogues for Tory Burch, Victoria's Secret, H&M, Nasty Gal, Dsquared² and Saks Fifth Avenue. She walked the runways of Prada, Loewe, Louis Vuitton, Fendi, Blumarine, Just Cavalli, Salvatore Ferragamo, DKNY, Derek Lam, Carolina Herrera, Anna Sui, Cushnie et Ochs, Tory Burch and Jeremy Scott.

She has been featured on the cover of fashion magazines, including Dazed and Confused, Elle and Madame Figaro, as well as editorials for Numéro, Vogue Deutschland, Vogue.com, V, LOVE, Marie Claire, Flair, CR Fashion Book, Exit, 10 Magazine and Russh.

She often poses for Victoria's Secret, and has walked for the Victoria's Secret Fashion Show in both 2017 and 2018.

== Personal life ==
In August 2021, Aasen became engaged to Italian businessman Tommaso "Tommy" Chiabra, chairman and co-founder of Neat Burger, as well as founder and chairman of Royal Yacht Brokers. The couple married in Portofino, Italy, on 14 July 2022. The couple resides in Monaco. Aasen is a pescetarian.
