= Lara Mullen =

British fashion model (born 1994)

- Born: Lara Stanisława Mullen; 6 July 1994 (age 32); Northamptonshire, England
- Occupation: Fashion model
- Modeling information
- Height: 1.80 m (5 ft 11 in)
- Hair color: Brown
- Eye color: Blue
- Agency: DNA Models (New York); Oui Management (Paris); Women Management (Milan); View Management (Barcelona); Seeds Management (Berlin); IMM Bruxelles (Brussels); Scoop Models (Copenhagen); Modelwerk (Hamburg); Freedom Models (Los Angeles); The Syndical (Miami); Priscilla's Model Management (Sydney); Elite Model Management (Toronto); Premier Model Management (London) (mother agency)

Lara Stanisława Mullen is a British fashion model.

== Early life ==
Mullen is of maternal Polish descent. She is Catholic.

== Career ==
Mullen was discovered at Underage Festival in Victoria Park, London; weeks later she debuted at Alexander Wang and walked for designers including Vera Wang, Topshop, Acne Studios, Jonathan Saunders, Dries van Noten, and Prada as an exclusive (considered the highest feat for a model). In Paris, she walked for Givenchy, Céline, and Chloé. In her career, she has also walked for Rag & Bone, Prabal Gurung, Tommy Hilfiger, Marc Jacobs, Rodarte, Calvin Klein, Marchesa, Oscar de la Renta, Mulberry, Versace, Roland Mouret, Roberto Cavalli, Fendi, Balmain, Gareth Pugh, Louis Vuitton, Valentino, Dior, Hermès, Sonia Rykiel, DKNY, John Galliano, Dolce & Gabbana, Kenzo, Missoni, Rick Owens, Burberry, Giorgio Armani, Nina Ricci, Proenza Schouler, Giambattista Valli, Joseph, Lacoste, Burberry, Erdem, and Mary Katrantzou among others.

Mullen has been on the cover of Dazed, i-D, and Vogue China.

In 2019, she was nominated for models.com's "Comeback of the Year" award, and is currently ranked as an "Industry Icon".
