= Amanda Googe =

American fashion model and artist

- Born: 1993 (age 32–33)
- Education: Brown University
- Modeling information
- Height: 1.77 m (5 ft 9 1/2 in)
- Hair color: Blonde
- Eye color: Blue
- Agency: Women Management (New York, Paris, Milan) (mother agency); Elite Model Management (London)

Amanda Rae Googe is an American fashion model and artist.

== Career ==
Googe was scouted in high school. After graduating from Brown University, she began modeling professionally, debuting as a Prada exclusive; it is considered the highest feat for a new model. In addition to a Steven Meisel-photographed Prada campaign, she walked for the likes of Dries van Noten, Chanel, Azzedine Alaïa, Isabel Marant, Dolce & Gabbana, Victoria Beckham, Tommy Hilfiger, Jason Wu, Narciso Rodriguez, Hugo Boss, Erdem, 3.1 Phillip Lim, Loewe, Sacai (which she opened), and Acne Studios (which she closed). She also opened and closed for Valentino couture.

She has appeared in Chinese, German, Russian, Spanish, Japanese and Thai editions of Vogue, as well as Vanity Fair France, Russh, WSJ, L'Officiel USA, and T.

As an artist, Googe has featured her works in Los Angeles.
