= Mathilde Henning =

Danish fashion model

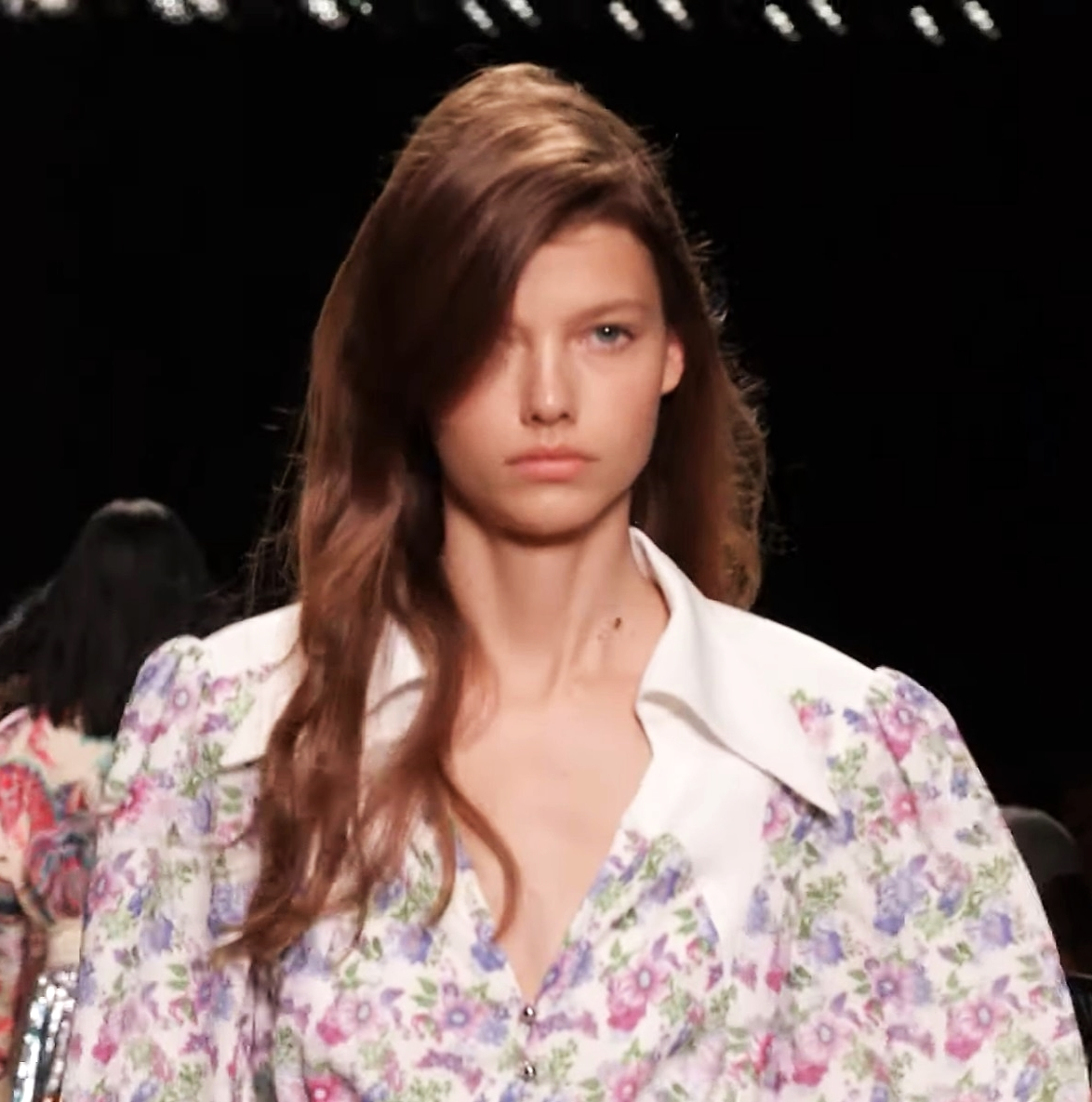
- Henning walking for Paco Rabanne in 2019
- Born: Mathilde Sofie Hess Henning; 20 January 2002 (age 24); Vejle, Denmark
- Modeling information
- Height: 5 ft 10 in (178 cm)
- Hair color: Brown
- Eye color: Blue-green
- Agency: Women Management (Milan, New York, and Paris); Premier Model Management (London); Scoop Models (Copenhagen) (mother agency)

Mathilde Sofie Hess Henning is a Danish fashion model. Models.com described Henning as a "Danish dream."

== Career ==
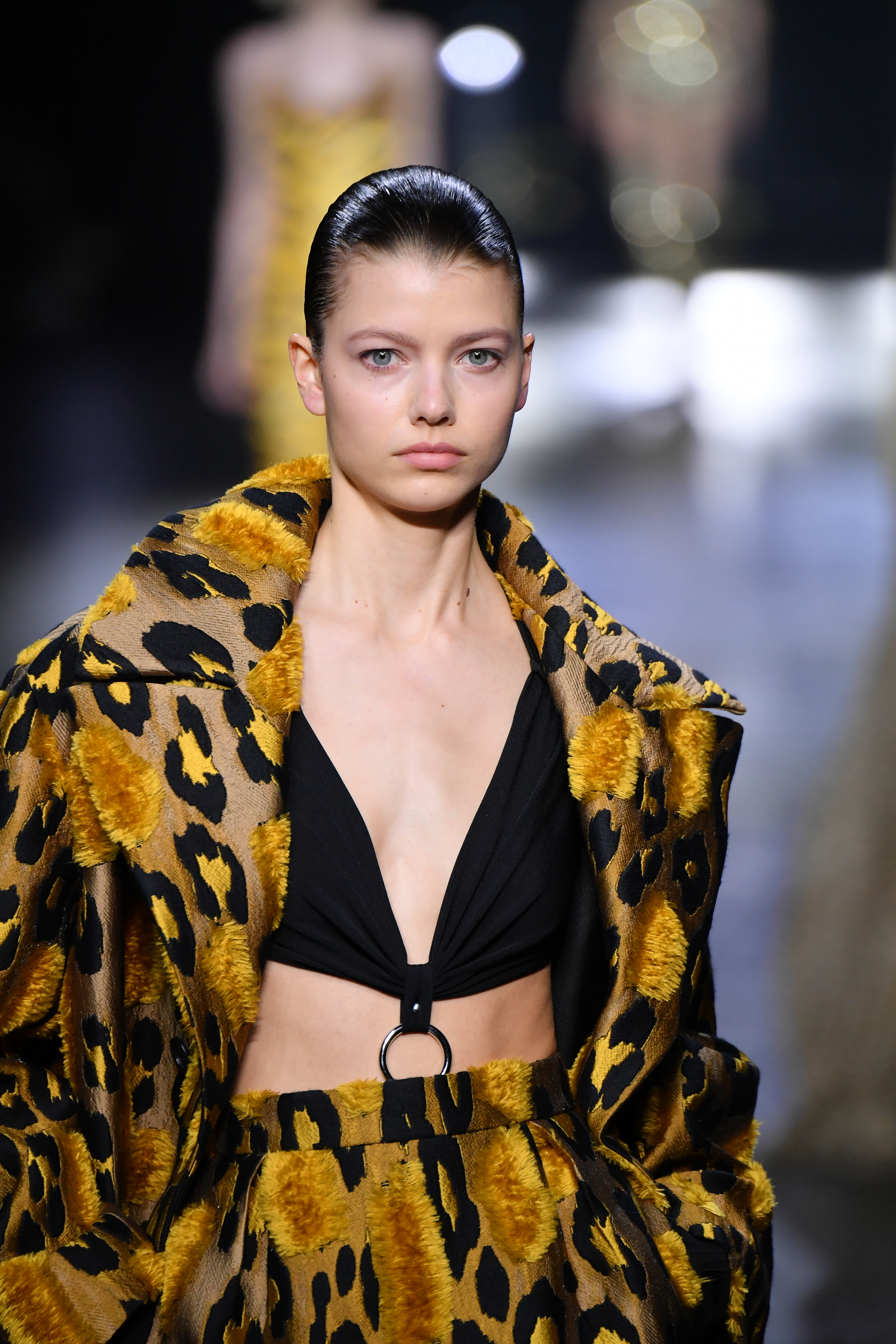
Mathilde Henning walking for Roberto Cavalli in 2022

Henning began modelling in Copenhagen, for Danish brands like Ganni, and appeared on the cover of the British fashion magazine i-D, photographed by David Sims. On the runway, she opened for Saint Laurent as an exclusive during Paris Fashion Week and appeared in an editorial for Vogue Paris, photographed by Christian MacDonald. She appeared on the decennial cover of Elle Denmark. Models.com selected her as having one of the best "breakout seasons" on the runway for 2019, having walked for designers including: Tom Ford, Versace, Saint Laurent, and Chanel.
