= Aliona Doletskaya =

Russian fashion journalist and editor

- Алёна Долецкая
- Born: 10 January 1955 (age 71); Moscow, Russian SFSR, Soviet Union
- Education: Moscow State University
- Occupation: Fashion journalist
- Known for: Editor in chief of Vogue Russia (1998–2010)

Aliona Stanislavovna Doletskaya (Russian: Алёна Станиславовна Долецкая; born 10 January 1955) is a Russian journalist and translator, the former editor in chief of Vogue Russia (1998–2010) and Interview Russia (2010–2017).

== Career ==
After graduating from the Faculty of Philology of Moscow State University, she defended her dissertation on contemporary rhetoric and published several translations of books by authors such as Ray Bradbury and William Faulkner. She did her doctoral work at Oxford University, but did not graduate.

In the early 1990s, Doletskaya changed her field of activity from the educational sphere to that of media and PR. After working as a reporter and producer of various European television channels, as well as media consultant for jewelry company DeBeers, Aliona Doletskaya was appointed Director of Public Relations at the British Council in Russia. In this role, she has successfully managed several cultural projects, including mounting an exhibition of The Royal Academy's "Living Bridges" in the Tretyakov Gallery and a joint exhibition in the Kremlin and the Tower of London "Treasures of the Tower".

In 1998, she was asked to lead the magazine Vogue Russia, at the time the first edition of this level in the country. Under the guidance of Aliona Doletskaya magazine Vogue Russia continues to be the most authoritative edition of fashion in Russia, whose content is characterized by a high degree of creativity and absolute quality.

Aliona left Vogue in 2010 to work on the launch of Andy Warhol’s Interview Magazine in 2011 both in Russia and in Germany.

In 2012 she also began to host her morning programs on TV Rain. Shortly afterwards in 2013, she published her books "Morning. 50 Breakfasts", and "Sunday Dinners".

In 2013, Aliona also hosted on TV Rain «Evening With Doletskaya» - a talk show aimed at challenging her male high-profile guests.
