= Anna Selezneva =

Russian fashion model (born 1990)

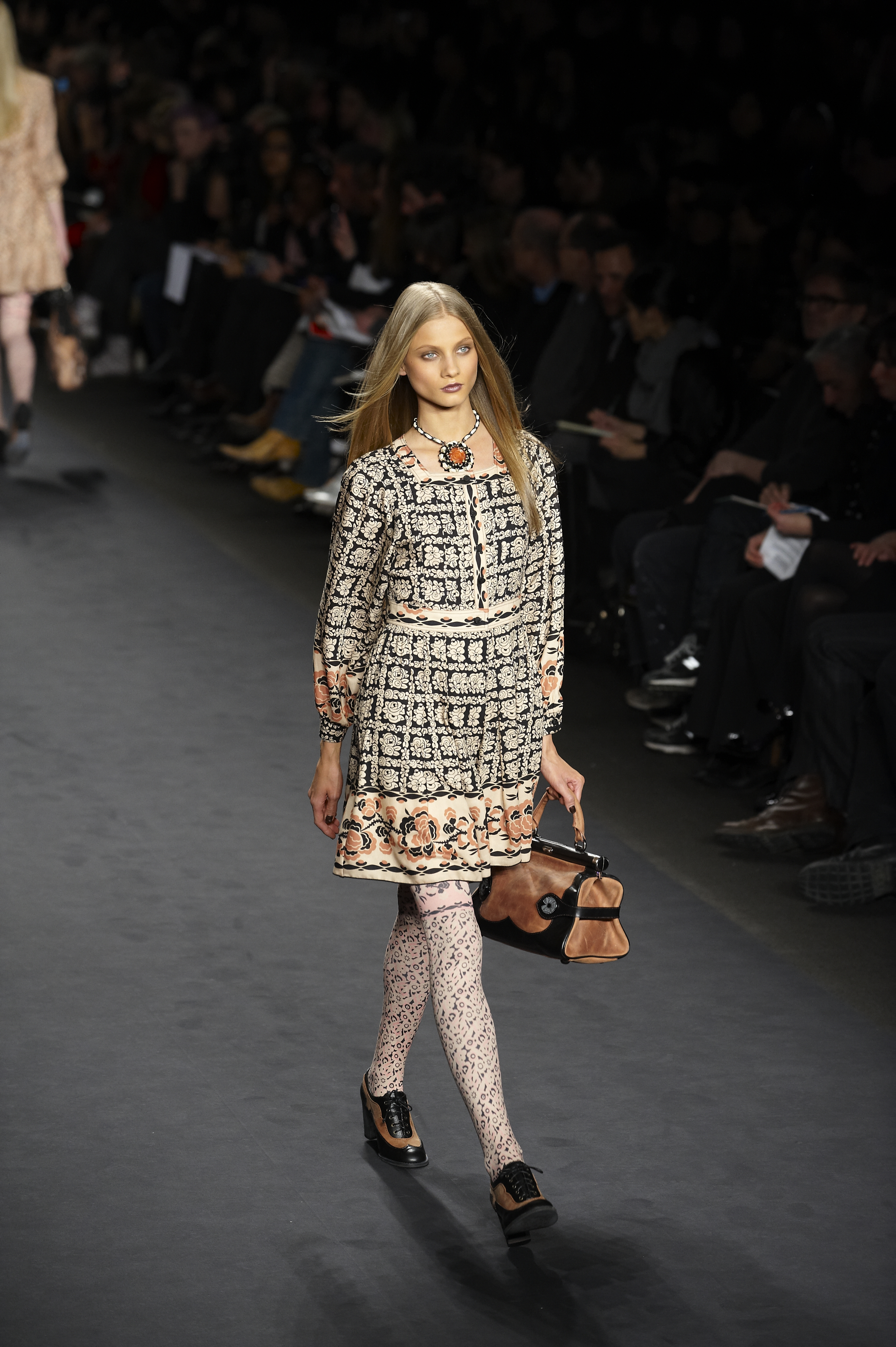
- Selezneva on the runway at Anna Sui in 2010
- Born: Anna Selezneva; 29 July 1990 (age 36); Moscow, Russian SFSR, Soviet Union (now Russia)
- Modeling information
- Height: 1.77 m (5 ft 9 1/2 in)
- Hair color: Dark Blonde
- Eye color: Blue / Green
- Agency: Silent (Mother Agency; Paris); Elite New York City (New York); Women Management Milan (Milan); Select Model Management (London); Mega Model Agency (Hamburg)

Anna Selezneva (Russian: Анна Селезнёва; born 29 July 1990) is a Russian fashion model who started her career in 2007. Selezneva became known for her high cheekbones and was discovered in 2007 at a McDonald's in Moscow. Selezneva has appeared in campaigns for Blumarine, Ralph Lauren, Versace.

== Early life ==
Anna was born in Moscow to a Russian father and a Russian-born Armenian mother. She was discovered in 2007 at a McDonald's. Later that year, she began her international modeling career after signing with a top agency in Paris.

== Career ==
Selezneva debuted on the runways of Dries van Noten, Céline, and Akris. Then she walked for all major brands and designers, including Alexander Wang, Balmain, Chanel, Christian Dior, Diane von Furstenberg, Dolce & Gabbana, Elie Saab, Emanuel Ungaro, Fendi, Giambattista Valli, Gianfranco Ferre, Giorgio Armani, Gucci, Hermès, Jean Paul Gaultier, Lanvin, Louis Vuitton, Marc Jacobs, Oscar de la Renta, Ralph Lauren, Roberto Cavalli, Valentino, Versace, Yves Saint Laurent and many others during the Spring Paris Fashion Week.

Selezneva was featured on the covers of many international fashion magazines, including Vogue Paris, Vogue Italia, Vogue Spain, Vogue Russia, Vogue Australia, Vogue Japan, Vogue China, Vogue Mexico, Vogue Thailand, Numéro, Numéro TOKYO, Allure (Russia), Harper's Bazaar (Germany, Korea), Elle (Spain, Argentina), Interview (Germany), Tatler (Russia), Magazine Antidote, MIXT(E), S Moda, V Magazine. She has also appeared in editorials in American Vogue, British Vogue, Vogue Germany, i-D, Harper's Bazaar, Muse Magazine, Self Service, The Last Magazine, Glamour (Russia), Porter Magazine.

Selezneva has appeared in advertising campaigns for Beymen Club, Massimo Dutti, Blumarine, Calvin Klein Collection, Cesare Paciotti, Emporio Armani, Fay, Guerlain «Aqua Allegoria» fragrance, Hogan, Hunkydory, John Galliano, Joop! Jeans, Juicy Couture, Mango, Marc O'Polo, Massimo Dutti, Moussy, Phi, Pierre Balmain, Pinko, Ralph Lauren, Replay, Santa Lolla, Santoni, System, Tory Burch, Trussardi, Vera Wang «Look» fragrance, Versace, Yves Saint Laurent «Elle Shocking» fragrance.

Vogue Paris declared Selezneva one of the top 30 models of the 2000s. Selezneva is ranked as one of the highest paid models by models.com.

== Personal life ==
Selezneva has an undergraduate degree in Psychology. She also studied at the Marangoni Fashion Institute in Paris and, as of 2008, planned to further her studies when her modeling career slowed down. She married Christopher Wynne (II) married 6th Jul 2017
