= Odette Pavlova =

Russian fashion model (born 1994)

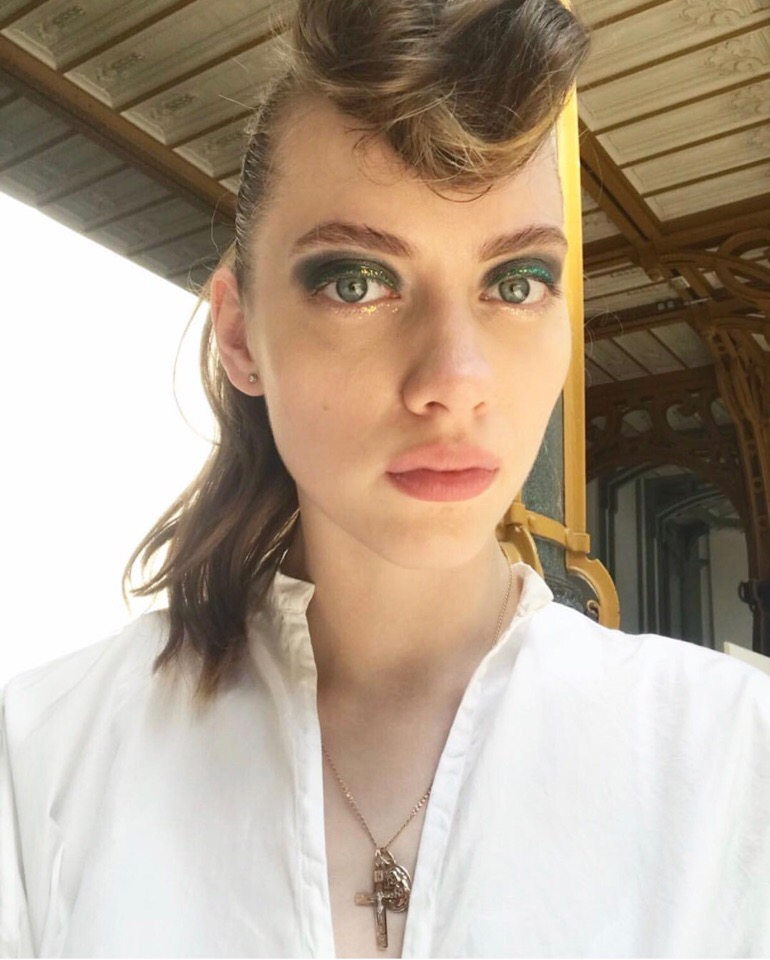
- Born: Victoria Pavlova; 25 April 1994 (age 32); Pskov, Pskov Oblast, Russia
- Occupation: Model
- Years active: 2012–present
- Modeling information
- Height: 5 ft 10.5 in (179 cm)
- Hair color: Dark Blonde
- Eye color: Blue
- Agency: Next Model Management (New York, Paris, Milan, London); Uno Models (Barcelona); Mega Model Agency (Hamburg); Zucca Model Agency (Tokyo)

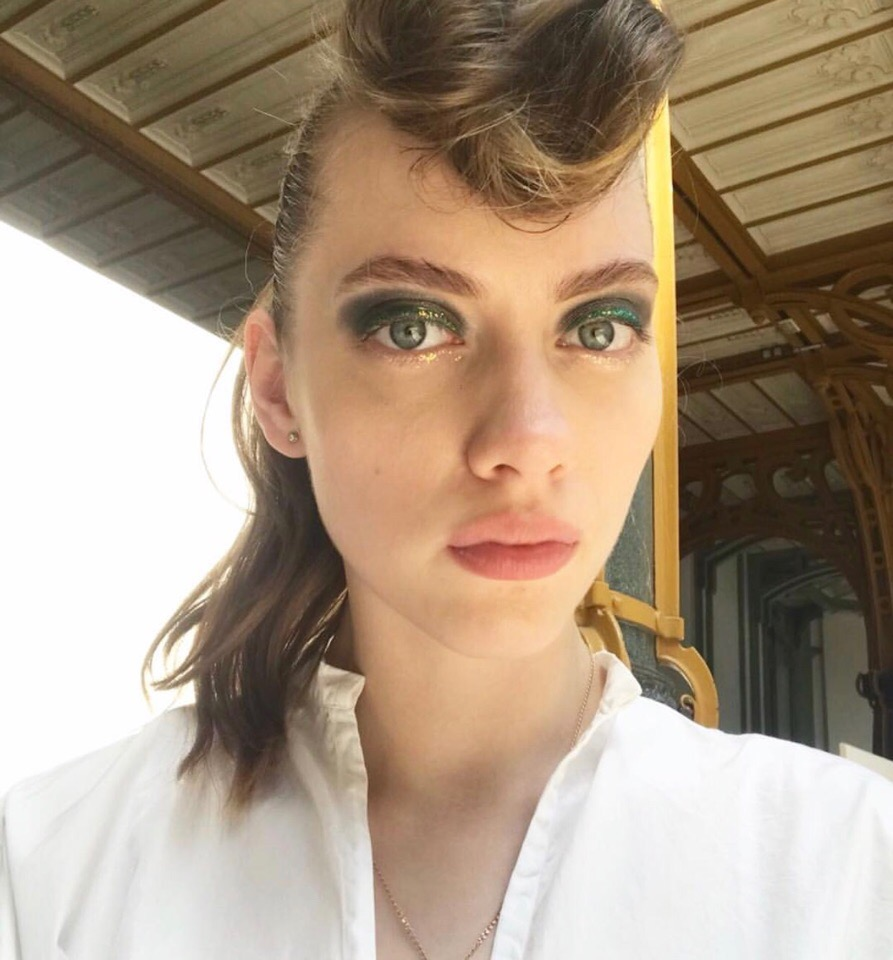

Victoria "Odette" Pavlova (Russian: Одетте (Виктория) Павлова; born 25 April 1994) is a Russian fashion model.

Odette Pavlova was born in Pskov, Pskov Oblast, but currently lives in Saint Petersburg, Russia. Victoria has a twin sister Lia (Yulia), who is also a top model.

She has appeared in editorials of Bon Magazine, Dazed, Heroine Magazine, i-D, Interview, LOVE, November Magazine, Numéro (French and Russian), Self Service, Vogue Germany, Vogue Italia, Vogue Japan, Vogue Spain, Vogue Paris, Vogue Russia and W Magazine.
