= Maryna Linchuk =

Belarusian model (born 1987)

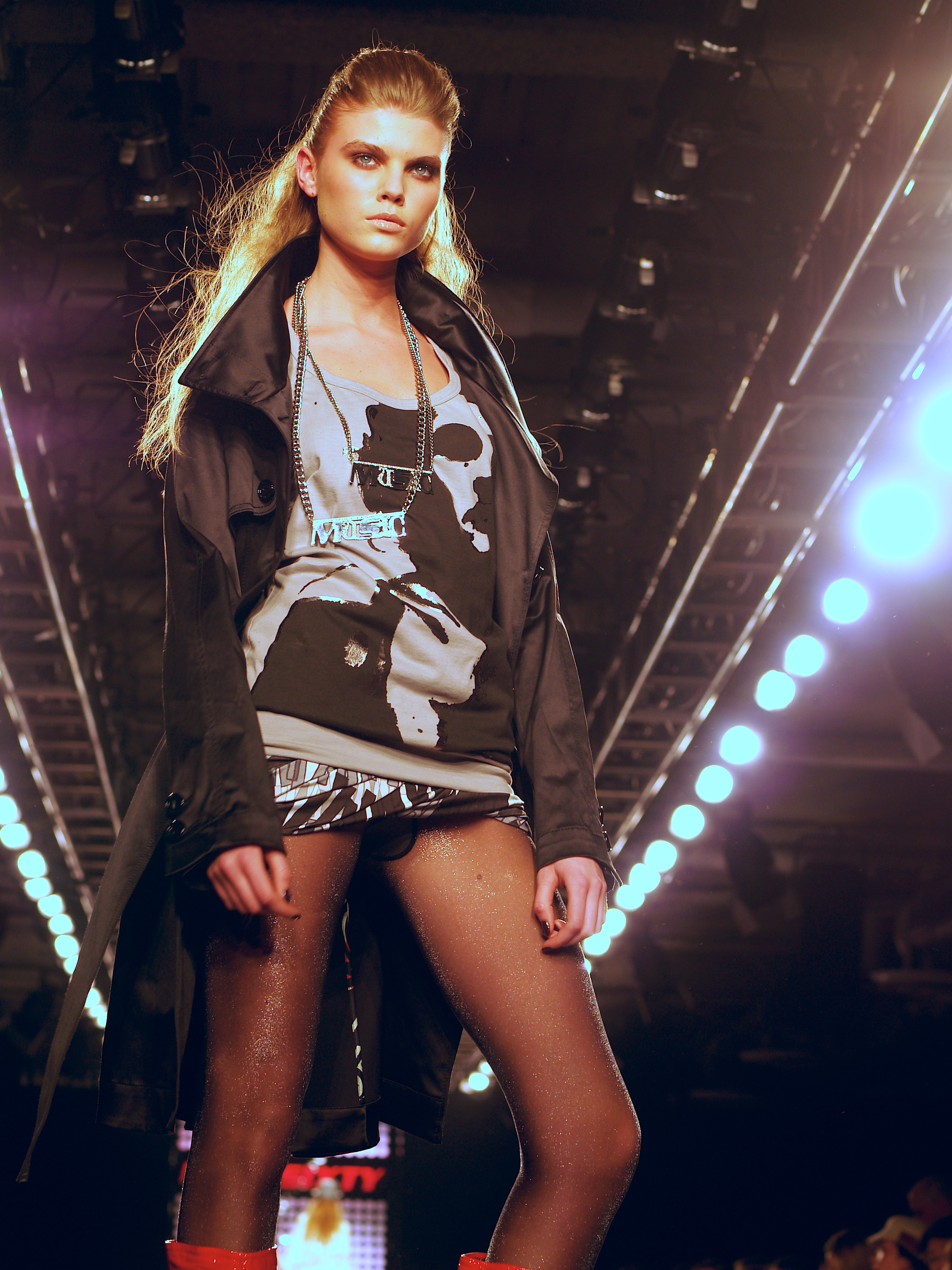
- Born: 4 September 1987 (age 39); Minsk, Byelorussian SSR, Soviet Union (now Belarus)
- Occupation: Model
- Years active: 2006–present
- Partner: Brian Casey
- Children: 2
- Modeling information
- Height: 1.80 m (5 ft 11 in)
- Hair color: Blonde
- Eye color: Blue
- Agency: The Lions (New York, Los Angeles); Why Not Model Management (Milan); Select Model Management (London); Uno Models (Barcelona); Modelwerk (Hamburg); Bravo Models (Tokyo)

Maryna Linchuk (Belarusian: Марына Лінчук; born 4 September 1987) is a Belarusian model.

== Early life ==
Linchuk was raised by her single mother in a communal house. Her mother later remarried and they moved to another place.

== Modeling career ==
Linchuk was scouted as a model when she was 12 years old. Soon after, she visited her agencies in Paris and London but struggled with growing accustomed to modeling. After a year later, she gave modeling another chance and tried her luck in Japan. Due to the work environment in Japan, she finally grew into modeling and stayed in Japan for a couple of years. She then returned home and stayed there for another year before venturing out to New York's fashion scene. She got signed with one of the leading New York modeling agencies, DNA models, in 2006.

Along with Mat Gordon and Valeria Garcia, Linchuk was one of the faces of Escada's Moon Sparkle fragrance under the alias Simone. She was also the Fall/Winter 2008–2010 face of the Miss Dior Cherie fragrance, directed by Sofia Coppola.

She has appeared in advertisements for Versace, Donna Karan, Dior, Gap, H&M, Kenneth Cole, Escada, Dolce & Gabbana and Max Mara. She walked in the 2008, 2009, 2010, 2011 and 2013 Victoria's Secret Fashion Shows, as well as for designers Givenchy, Gucci, Michael Kors, Prada, Christian Lacroix, Dior, Versace, Balmain, Louis Vuitton, Valentino and many others.

Linchuk has also been featured on the covers of other international Vogue such as Italian, Russian, German, Japanese, Spanish, starred in Vogue US, Vogue Paris declared her one of the top 30 models of the 2000s.

She was cast and played a short role in Sofia Coppola's movie Somewhere, which released in 2010.

She appeared in the music video for the song "Waves" by Mr Probz.

== Personal life ==
Linchuk is currently engaged to her partner Brian Casey, with whom she has two daughters.
