= Ranya Mordanova =

Russian fashion model (born 1991)

- Born: Raniya Ramilevna Mordanova; July 18, 1991 (age 34); Ufa, Bashkortostan, Russia
- Modeling information
- Height: 5 ft 9 in / 175 cm
- Hair color: Brown
- Eye color: Brown
- Agency: Premier Model Management; Bravo Models; Elite Model Management; Avant Model Agency

Ranya Mordanova (Russian: Раня Морданова; born Raniya Ramilevna Mordanova on July 18, 1991) is a Russian fashion model.

== Career ==
Ranya Mordanova was born in Ufa, Bashkortostan, Russia.

She soon became one of the faces of Givenchy fall/winter 2009 campaign alongside Adriana Lima, Iris Strubegger, and Mariacarla Boscono for its advertising campaign shot by photographers Mert Alas and Marcus Piggott.
