= Tank (magazine) =

British magazine

- Cover
- Editor: Masoud Golsorkhi
- Frequency: Quarterly
- Founded: 1998
- Company: Tank Publications Ltd.
- Country: United Kingdom
- Based in: London
- Language: English
- Website: www.tank.tv
- ISSN: 1464-3472

Tank is an independent UK-based magazine launched in 1998. It is a quarterly publication, printed in the UK, that covers contemporary culture, fashion, art, architecture, technology and politics. Since its launch, the Tank group has expanded to include Tank Form, tank.tv, TankBooks and Because magazine.

== History ==
Tank was launched by editor-in-chief Masoud Golsorkhi and art director Andreas Laeufer in September 1998. The first issue was published in the form of a thick, square, miniature book. Its slogan “Small tank, big fish” began a trend where thinkers, writers, artists and photographers could look beyond conventional areas of discussion.

In 2002, upon Laeufer’s departure, Caroline Issa was appointed the magazine’s publisher and fashion director. Issa was quickly established as a “perennial street style favourite” and “fixture on the fashion week circuit”.

== Format and content ==
The magazine has produced a number of different incarnations: bulk pocket book, large wire-bound magazine and finally a rectangular perfect-bound edition. It publishes with less adverts, no more than 5% of the content, and instead profits by charging a higher cover price.

Tank’s independent editorial platform takes its motto “Elitism for All” from a maxim by Jean-François Lyotard. Each issue revolves around a speculative concept or theoretical framework. Past subjects have included: revolution, disorientation, reality, bubbles and the city. Ane Lynge-Jorlén described the magazine as one of the alternative fashion publications.

== Tank Form ==
Launched in 2003, Tank Form is an independent, boutique creative agency that grew out of Tank magazine. It described itself as "specialist, not generalist".

Special projects have included sponsored publications created for Prada and Levi's. ...And? was a pink broadsheet newspaper created for Prada. MINED, a palindrome of the word ‘denim’, was a thick magazine created for Levi’s, it won the D&AD Yellow Pencil Editorial and Book Design Award in 2002.

== TankBooks ==
TankBooks was launched in 2007 and features unabridged classics in the form of cigarette packs. Their release coincided with the ban on smoking in public places in the UK. Created for “lovers of literature and connoisseurs of design”. TankBooks repackages the works of Joseph Conrad, Ernest Hemingway, Rudyard Kipling, Leo Tolstoy, Franz Kafka and Robert Louis Stevenson. The cigarette books received an iF product design award in 2008.

== O: Quarterly Fashion Supplement by Tank ==
O: by Tank was a luxury fashion supplement created for The Observer. It ran from 2005 to 2013 and focused on the world of fashion and beauty. Published four times a year, O: functioned both as a shopping guide and a source of inspiration for upcoming seasons.

== tank.tv ==
Tank.tv, an online platform established in 2003, profiles contemporary artists, both emerging and prominent, that work specifically in moving image, film and video formats. Tank.tv collaborated on a number of events with international art institutions, including: Tate Modern, Kulturhuset, Center for Art and Media Karlsruhe and the Institute of Contemporary Arts.

Turner Prize winning artist Laure Provoust directed Tank.tv from 2004-2011, initiating discussion with and invitations to artists, writers and curators including Paul McCarthy, Pipilotti Rist, Jeremy Deller, John Latham, Hans-Ulrich Obrist, Stuart Comer, John Bock and Negar Azimi. All work commissioned by and invited onto tank.tv is archived and available to view on the website,

In 2013, a decade after launching, tank.tv opened an exhibition space on Great Portland Street, London.
