= Kris Grikaite =

Russian model of Lithuanian descent (born 2000)

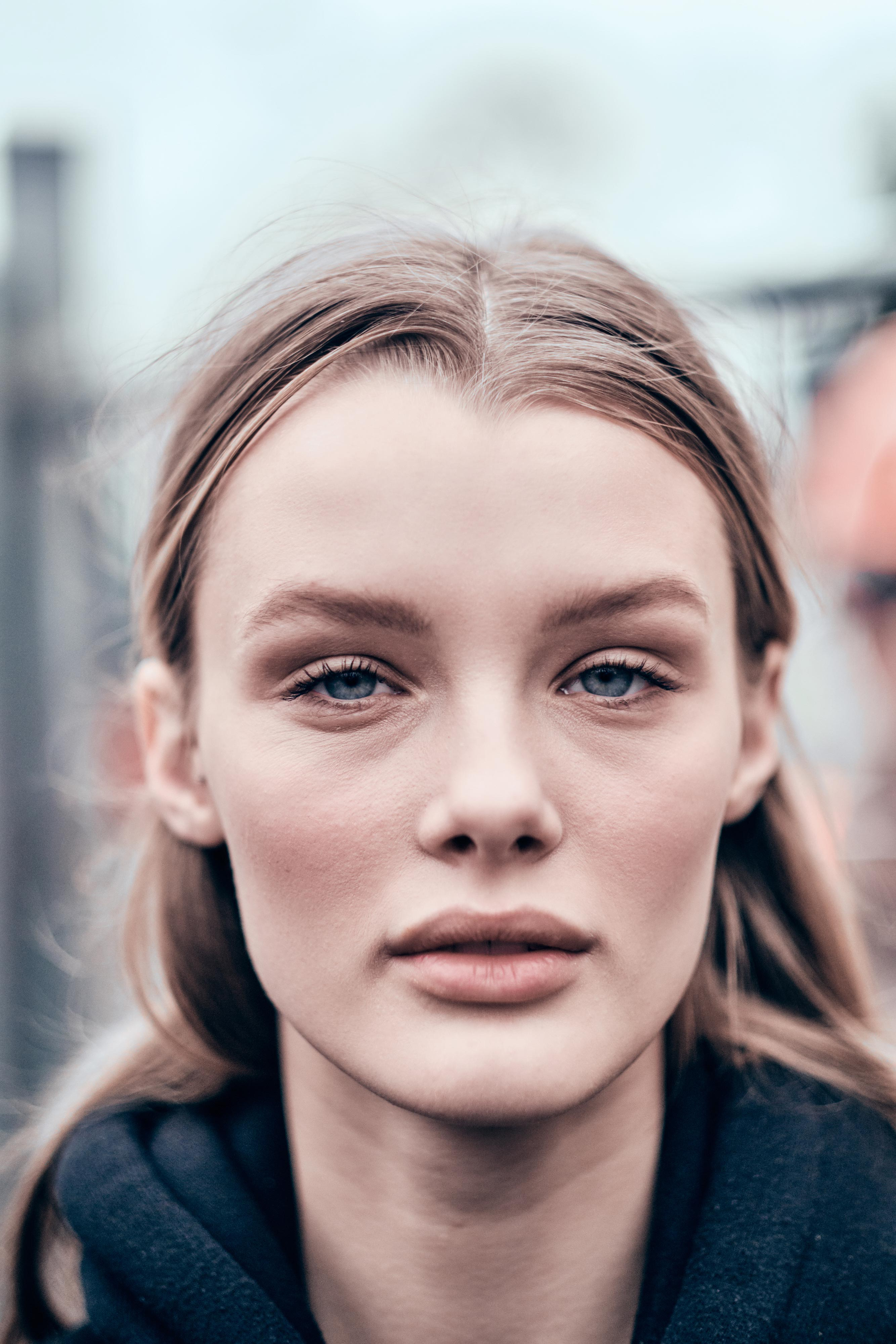
- Grikaite in 2019
- Born: Kristina Grikaite; 25 July 2000 (age 26); Omsk, Russia
- Occupation: Model
- Modeling information
- Height: 1.75 m (5 ft 9 in)
- Hair color: Light brown
- Eye color: Blue
- Agency: The Lions (New York, Los Angeles); Ford Models (Paris); Premier Model Management (London); Avant Models Agency (Moscow)

Kristina Grikaite (Russian: Кристина Грикайте; born July 25, 2000) is a Russian model of Lithuanian descent.

== Early life and career ==
Grikaite was born on July 25, 2000, in Omsk, Russia. She began her modeling career with Avant Models in Moscow after tagging along with a friend to the agency and was signed immediately. Since S/S 2017, Kris has been an exclusive model for Prada's runway shows. She walked at Prada's S/S 2017 (exclusive), F/W 2017 Menswear, F/W 2017 (opened), S/S 2018 (opened) fashion shows and appeared in Prada's S/S 2017, F/W 2017 and S/S 2018 advertisement campaigns, shot by Willy Vanderperre.

Kris has appeared in editorials for Vogue US, British Vogue, Vogue Paris, Vogue Italia, Vogue Russia, Vogue China, Interview Magazine, Self Service and Love Magazine, photographed by David Mushegain, Steven Meisel, Benjamin Huseby, Patrick Demarchelier, David Sims, Mario Sorrenti, Amy Troost, Paolo Roversi, Christian MacDonald, Craig McDean, Daniel Jackson, Steven Klein and Alasdair McLellan. In May 2017, she appeared on the cover of Vogue Russia, photographed by Ben Weller.

She was included in the "Top Newcomers F/W 2017" Industry Selects list by British Vogue editor-in-chief Edward Enninful on Models.com, and was ranked as one of the "Top 50" models.
