= Cameron Russell =

American supermodel and activist (born 1987)

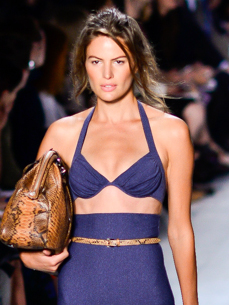
- Russell at New York Fashion Week, 2014.
- Born: June 14, 1987 (age 39); Cambridge, Massachusetts, U.S.
- Education: Columbia University
- Years active: 2003-present
- Children: 1
- Modeling information
- Height: 1.75 m (5 ft 9 in)
- Hair color: Brown
- Eye color: Brown
- Agency: The Lions (New York, Los Angeles)

Cameron Russell (born June 14, 1987) is an American fashion supermodel and activist. Born in Cambridge, Massachusetts, she graduated from Columbia University with majors in economics and political science. Russell began modeling in 2003.

Russell was initially signed up by the Ford Models, but she later switched to DNA Model Management in 2006, and eventually the Elite Model Management in 2011. Since her debut as a model, she has walked at fashion shows for designers and fashion houses including Chanel, Versace, Prada, Vivienne Westwood, Victoria's Secret, Diane von Fürstenberg and Louis Vuitton among others.

Russell has appeared in photoshoots for American and European fashion magazines like Vogue, Numéro, and W. She is an active endorser and is associated with brands including Calvin Klein, Armani, Louis Vuitton, and Benetton. Russell delivered a TED talk in October 2012, entitled "Looks aren't Everything. Believe me, I'm a Model", which went on to become one of the most popular speeches ever given at a TED conference.

== Early life and education ==
Cameron Russell was born and raised in Cambridge. Her mother is Robin Chase, founder of Zipcar. Her father is an engineer and was the CEO of the now defunct GoLoco, a car-pooling and social networking company.

Russell displayed an interest in politics at an early age. Friends of hers who had worked on the Clinton Presidential election campaign arranged a meeting on June 5, 1998 (when she was 10) with Bill Clinton after he delivered a speech at the Massachusetts Institute of Technology. She graduated from the Commonwealth School in 2005.

She briefly attended Wellesley College in Wellesley, Massachusetts, her mother's alma mater, before transferring to Columbia University after her freshman year. She majored in economics and political science. Russell graduated from Columbia University with honors in 2013.

== Modeling career ==
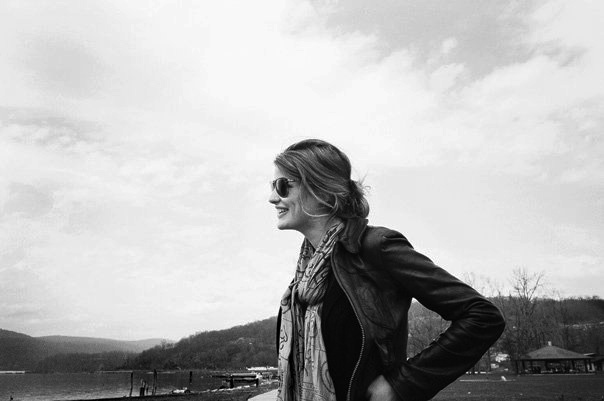
Russell in upstate New York, 2008

Russell's mother had a friend who worked at Ford Models agency, and Russell decided to sign with that agency in 2003. She later moved on to DNA Model Management in 2006, switched to Women Management in 2008, and then moved to Elite Model Management in 2011. In 2017, she joined the boutique agency The Lions.

Since beginning her modeling career part-time at the age of 16, Russell has worked with numerous successful photographers including Steven Meisel, Craig McDean, and Nick Knight among others, in such magazines as American, French, Italian, Spanish, German and Japanese Vogue, W, Self Service and Numéro. She has featured in advertising campaigns for companies including Ann Taylor, Benetton, Louis Vuitton, Ralph Lauren, Calvin Klein, Armani, Oscar de la Renta, and Yves Saint Laurent.

Russell has featured in runway fashion shows for designers including Chanel, Louis Vuitton, Prada, Dolce & Gabbana, Marc Jacobs, Versace, Vivienne Westwood, Ralph Lauren, Victoria's Secret, and Diane von Fürstenberg.

== Advocacy ==
Russell is actively involved in the climate movement. She advocates for the fashion industry to be more involved in sustainability. Russell reported on COP21 for Vogue. Russell contributed to the 2020 collection All We Can Save focused on women taking action in the climate movement.

In October 2017, Russell contributed to the #MeToo campaign by reaching out to other models, colleagues, and friends, asking for their personal experiences with harassment and exploitation. She used her platform on her Instagram to anonymously post their testimonies in an attempt to bring further awareness to the sexual harassment many face but never speak up about. She also is involved in politics, participating in the Democratic National Convention in 2020.

== Personal life ==
In November 2017, Russell revealed in an Instagram post that she was pregnant with her first child. She gave birth to son Asa Baker Russell in March 2018.
