= Valery Kaufman =

Russian model (born 1994)

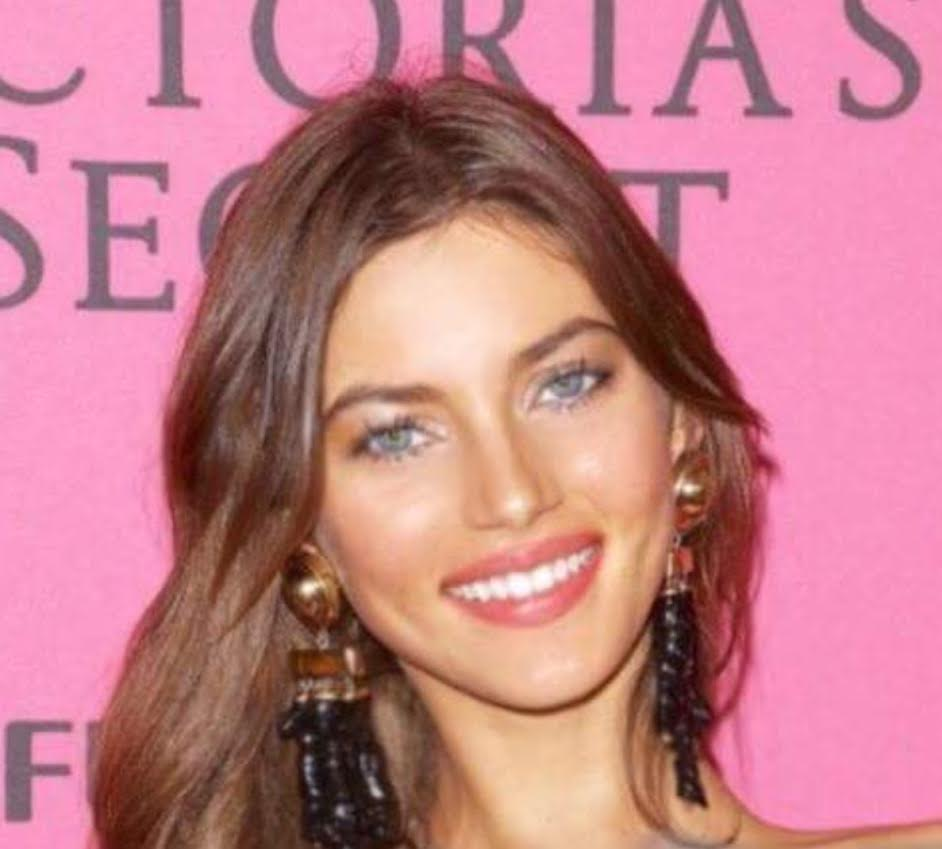
- Kaufman in 2015
- Born: 30 May 1994 (age 32); Moscow, Russia
- Occupation: Model
- Years active: 2013–present
- Spouse: Dimitri Varsano (m. 2024)
- Modeling information
- Height: 1.79 m (5 ft 10 1/2 in)
- Hair color: Dark Blonde
- Eye color: Green
- Agency: Elite Model Management (Barcelona, Paris, London, Copenhagen) Why Not Model Management

Valery Kaufman (Russian: Валерия Кауфман; born 30 May 1994) is a Russian model best known for walking in Victoria's Secret Fashion Show 2015 and Victoria's Secret Fashion Show 2016.

== Career ==
She was born in 1994 in Moscow. From an early age, she was engaged in dancing. Later, she toured the world extensively.

In the early 2010s, she sent her photos to several model agencies in New York, and soon received an invitation to a casting call for a fashion show by Tom Ford, which she successfully passed. Her career as a model developed quickly. Following her appearance on the cover of the Russian edition of Vogue in March 2015, she received invitations to fashion shows by Chanel, Dior and Valentino.

At various times she has participated in the shows of Alberta Ferretti, Alexander Wang, Alexandre Vauthier, Balmain, Blumarine, Chanel, Christian Dior, Diane von Furstenberg, Dolce & Gabbana, Elie Saab, Emilio Pucci, Fendi, Giambattista Valli, Giorgio Armani, Givenchy, Gucci, Louis Vuitton, Nina Ricci, Oscar de la Renta, Prada, Tom Ford, Valentino, Versace, Yves Saint Laurent and others.

Valeria is one of French photographer Patrick Demarchelier's favorite models. In 2015 and 2016, she was invited to the Victoria's Secret Fashion Show.

In 2015, she was named one of the "World's Top 50 Models" by Models.com, and was recognized as the best Russian model by Glamour magazine.

== Personal life ==
Kaufman was in a relationship with American musician and actor Jared Leto from 2015 until 2021. Although the relationship ended in 2021, Leto did not publicly acknowledge the breakup until September 2022.

She met businessman Dimitri Varsano at an amfAR gala, and the two began dating in October 2021. Exactly one year later, in October 2022, Varsano proposed.

On May 11, 2024, Kaufman married Dimitri Varsano, son of Miss Polonia in 1985, Katarzyna Zawidzka and businessman Sergo Varsano, at Mairie Du 16ème in Paris and in Lake Como in Italy.

On May 30, 2026, her 32nd birthday, Kaufman announced through her official Instagram account that she and her husband, Dimitri Varsano, were expecting their first child. The announcement was accompanied by a photograph showing the couple embracing and kissing during a birthday celebration, with Kaufman displaying her baby bump. She captioned the post, "The best birthday gift is already on the way."

On october 16, 2026

Valery and Dimitri they first baby was born hes name is Ethan
