= Grace Hartzel =

American fashion model (born 1995)

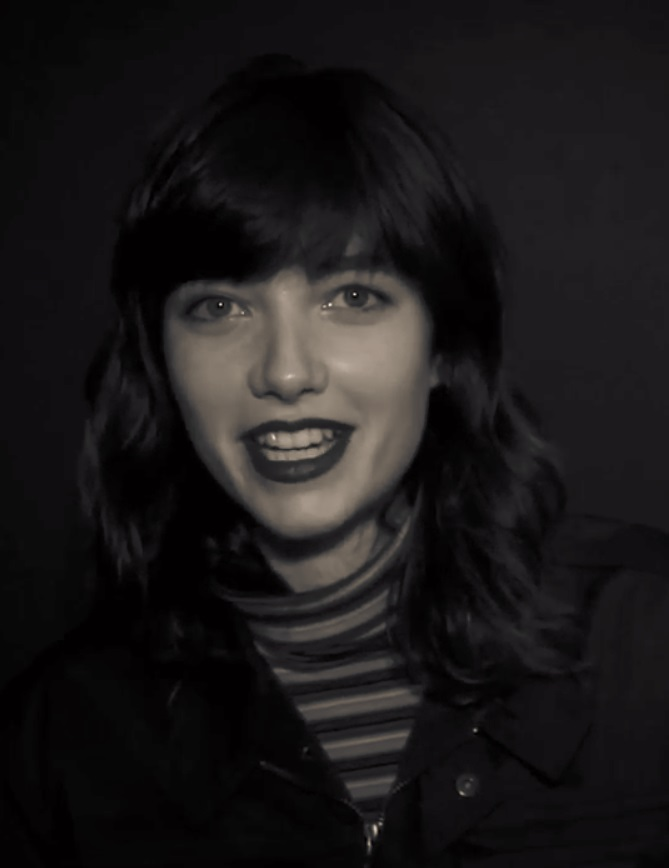
- Grace Hartzel for Love magazine in 2017
- Born: Grace Kathleen Hartzel; October 11, 1995 (age 30); Zionsville, Indiana
- Occupation: Model
- Years active: 2011–present
- Modeling information
- Height: 5 ft 10 in (178 cm)
- Hair color: Brown
- Eye color: Blue
- Agency: Next Model Management (New York, Paris, Milan, London, Los Angeles, Miami); Traffic Models (Barcelona); Le Management (Copenhagen); MIKAs (Stockholm); Mother Management (St. Louis)

Grace Kathleen Hartzel (born October 11, 1995) is an American fashion model from Zionsville, Indiana. She was discovered at the age of 15 while dining at a St. Louis Cheesecake Factory with her family. She has walked in nearly every major show during the fall/winter 2015 and spring/summer 2016 shows after being noted as a muse of then-YSL fashion designer Hedi Slimane in the fall/winter 2014 show. Slimane's spring 2014 show was entirely made in Hartzel's image, when she was an unknown.

Hartzel was also featured in a 2016 Salvatore Ferragamo short film My Life is a Play, directed by Sebastien Grousset and filmed by Paweł Edelman.

== Modeling career ==
Grace Hartzel debuted as a runway model in 2012, since then she has walked for brands such as Vera Wang, Prada, Yves Saint Laurent, Dior, Chanel, Fendi, Salvatore Ferragamo, Moschino, Bottega Venetta, Marc Jacobs, Alberta Ferretti, Armani, Gucci, Givenchy, Lacoste, Lanvin, Loewe, Carolina Herrera, Dolce & Gabbana, Louis Vuitton, Alexander Mc Queen, Dsquared2, Valentino, OscardelaRenta, Paul Smith, Blumarine, Burberry, Celine, Versace, Tom Ford, Elie Saab, Max Mara, Michael Kors, Miu miu, Ralph Lauren, Roberto Cavalli and Tommy Hilfiger.

Hartzel has appeared in different advertising campaigns for brands and fashion houses such as: Chanel watches, DKNY fragrance, Carolina Herrera, Saint Laurent, Etro, Valentino, Chloe, Tom Ford, Salvatore Ferragamo, Dior, Sonia Rykiel, Tods, Calvin Klein, Dsquared2, Coach, YSL beauty, and ZARA.

Grace has made numerous editorials and has been on the cover of different fashion magazines such as Interview, I-D, Pop magazine and Elle France, as well as different covers and international editions of VOGUE, such as: Vogue Russia and Vogue Japan.

As of 2021, Hartzel was ranked as an Industry Icon by models.com.

== Filmography ==
Films
Year	Title	Role	Notes
2016	My Life Is a Play		Short film
2017	ERDEM x H&M: The Secret Life of Flowers		Short film
2020	Saint Laurent - Summer of '21	Herself	Short film
