= Kaleemullah =

Kaleemullah may refer to:

- Kaleemullah (cricketer) (born 1990), Omani cricketer
- Kaleemullah Khan (field hockey) (born 1958), Pakistani field hockey player
- Kaleemullah Khan (footballer) (born 1992), Pakistani footballer
- Kaleemullah Lashari (born 1953), Pakistani archaeologist
