= Lia Pavlova =

Russian fashion model (born 1994)

- Born: Yulia Pavlova; 25 April 1994 (age 32); Pskov, Pskov Oblast, Russia
- Occupation: Model
- Years active: 2013–present
- Modeling information
- Height: 5 ft 11 in (180 cm)
- Hair color: Light Brown
- Eye color: Blue
- Agency: Fusion models (New York); New Madison (Paris); Brave Model Management (Milan); The Hive Management (London); Uno Models (Barcelona); Morph MGMT (Seoul); Stage Tokyo Model Agency (Tokyo)

Yulia "Lia" Pavlova (Russian: Юлия Павлова; born 25 April 1994) is a Russian fashion model who currently lives in New York City, US.

== Biography ==
Born in Pskov, Pskov Oblast, Russia, Pavlova debuted on the runway during Milan Fashion Week Fall/ Winter 2015 -2016 walking for Gucci show.

Lia has a twin sister Viktoria, who is also a model.
