= Vogue Russia =

Russian fashion magazine

Vogue Russia / Vogue Россия

- Cover of the final issue of Russian Vogue, March 2022; Michaela Stark by Lea Colombo
- Categories: Fashion
- Frequency: Monthly
- Publisher: Condé Nast Russia
- First issue: September 1998
- Final issue: March 2022
- Country: Russia
- Based in: Moscow
- Language: Russian
- Website: vogue.ru
- ISSN: 0042-8000

Vogue Russia (Russian: Vogue Россия; stylised in all caps) was the Russian edition of the American fashion magazine Vogue. The magazine was originally launched in 1998 and ran until 2022 when Condé Nast exited Russia.

== Background ==
Vogue Russia was the Russian edition of the American fashion magazine Vogue. The magazine was published monthly.

The magazine was launched in 1998 and was the sixth international fashion magazine to launch in Russia, following Cosmopolitan Russia (launched in May 1994), Harper's Bazaar Russia (launched in March 1996), Elle Russia (launched in April 1996), Marie Claire Russia (launched in March 1997) and L'Officiel Russia (launched in August 1997). It was published by Condé Nast Russia and edited by Aliona Doletskaya.

However, in 2022 publication was suspended when Condé Nast exited Russia closing Vogue Russia, GQ Russia, GQ Style Russia, Tatler Russia, Glamour Russia, Glamour Style Book Russia and Architectural Digest Russia. This was in response to new censorship laws in the country and its invasion of Ukraine.

=== Editors ===
Editor	Start year	End year	Ref.
Vogue Russia (1998–2022)
Aliona Doletskaya	1998	2010	
Victoria Davydova	2010	2018	
Masha Fedorova	2018	2021	
Ksenia Solovieva	2021	2022	

== History ==
In August 1997 it was reported that Condé Nast had formed a joint-venture with SK Communications International to publish Vogue Russia, with the first issue planned for Spring 1998. However, in October 1997 it was reported that the partnership was scrapped and instead a subsidiary (fully owned by Condé Nast International) would be set up to launch Russian Vogue in mid-1998.

Before launch 90% brand awareness of Vogue in Russia was for Vogue cigarettes according to the Editor-in-Chief Aliona Doletskaya.

The first issue (September 1998) became available for purchase from 22 August, to celebrate the launch a party was planned to be held in September on the Red Square in Moscow. However the party was cancelled as it was decided that holding the party would be "insensitive" at a time when the country was in the middle of a financial crisis. The publication had a budget of $2 million to advertise the launch.

On the cover of the first issue were Kate Moss and Amber Valletta (as can be seen above in the infobox at the top of the page) and they were photographed by Mario Testino, Doletskaya (the magazine's Editor-in-Chief) agreed in a 2016 interview with Rebecca Kesby for the BBC that the magazine helped to build the national identity of Russia following the collapse of the Soviet Union.

Russian Vogue's launch issue was 308 pages and earned $1 million from advertisers and was projected to sell over 100,000 copies. By July 1999 the publication was averaging on sales of 150,000 per issue however circulation had slipped but sales were high in former Soviet Republics.

For the launch Aliona Doletskaya was appointed editor-in-chief, she originally heard about the job from a friend and at the time thought that "they [Condé Nast] would never launch Vogue in Russia". Under Doletskaya the magazine gained a reputation of employees being overworked and supposedly the magazine turned away anyone who had previously worked for Russian magazines. At the time Russian magazines were viewed as being not as high quality as there international counterparts.

A supplement called Men's Vogue was launched in 2000 and in 2001 it became its own edition as GQ Russia.

By 2008 the magazine had a circulation of 200,000 per issue, it was not far off of American Vogue's 2007 circulation of 220,000 per issue.

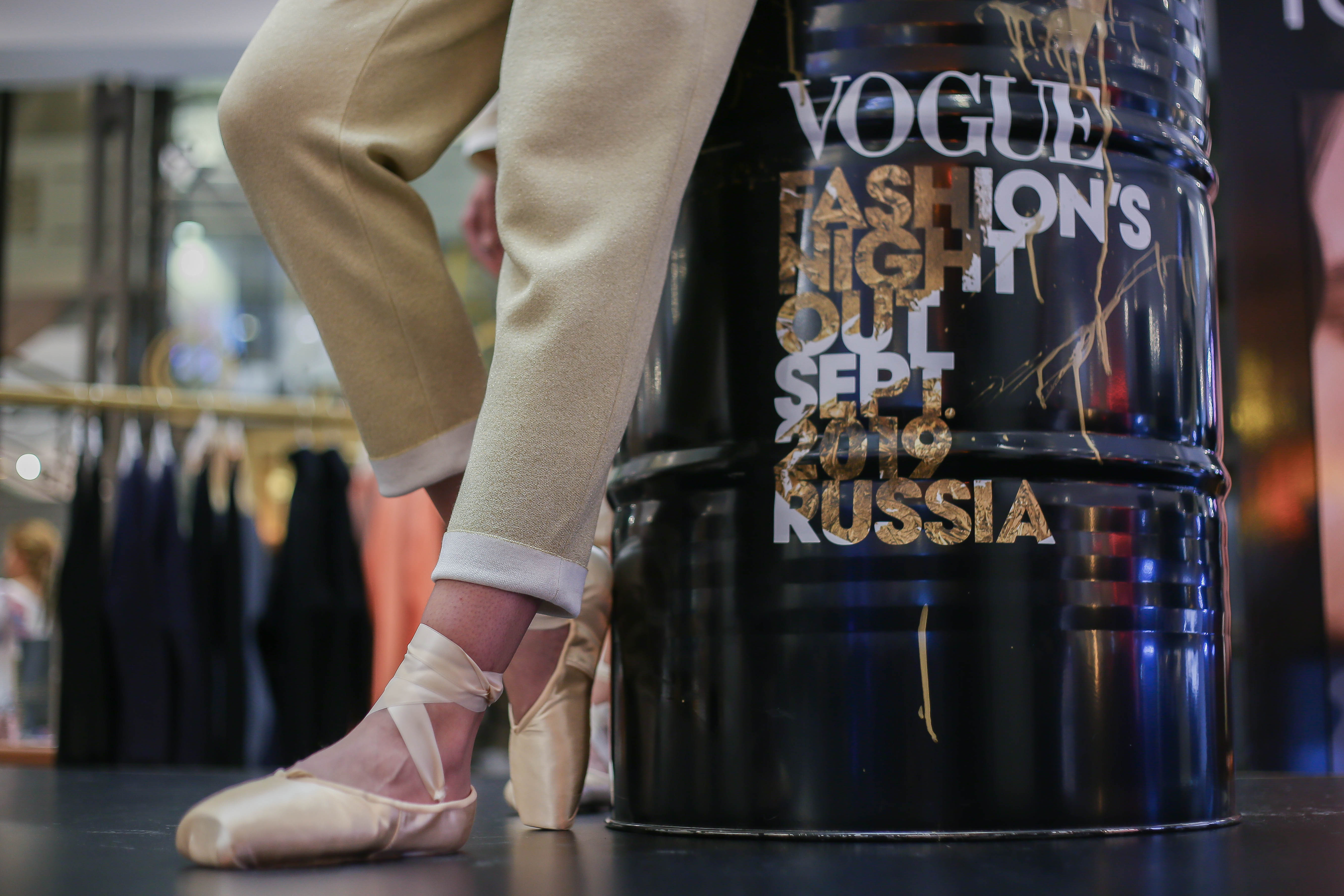
Photo from Fashion's Night Out in 2019

Vogue Russia launched Fashion’s Night Out in 2009 with Doletskaya saying that the night is “meant to create a feeling of confidence among fashion consumers in these days of economic difficulties,” and bring back shoppers to Moscow's high end shops following the Great Recession. For the event the high-end stores on Stoleshnikov Pereulok stayed open until 12–2am. It was originally created by Anna Wintour.

Aliona Doletskaya resigned in July 2010, Condé Nast CEO Jonathan Newhouse said "It is difficult to overstate the significance, even the historical importance, of Aliona's contribution to Russian Vogue and to the zeitgeist of new Russia" and "In a short time, a new editor for Vogue will be announced. But in a sense, Aliona's role at Vogue has been unique, and she can never be truly replaced,". At the time there was a "changing of the guard" in the Russian publishing industry with Evelina Khromchenko of L'Officiel Russia since 1997, being fired from her position in May 2010.

Following Doletskaya's resignation, Victoria Davydova (previously editor of Tatler Russia) became the magazines new editor from July. She caused controversy with her debut issue which featured Uzbek-Russian gymnast turned politician Alina Kabayeva (rumoured to be in an affair with Vladimir Putin) on the cover with netizens calling it a "disgrace". Bozhena Rynska of Gazeta.ru called Davydova "dull" and "manageable".

For the third Fashion’s Night Out in 2011 the supermodel Natasha Poly helped to lead the event. By 2011 the event had expanded to other streets including Tretyakovsky Proyezd.

Masha Fedorova stepped down from her role as Editor-in-Chief in February 2021 and was replaced by Ksenia Solovieva, Solovieva was previously the Editor-in-Chief of Russian Tatler since 2010.

For the magazines November 2021 issue the Dutch model Jill Kortleve was on the cover and was the first plus-size model to be on the magazines cover in its 23-year history. The reception was mixed.

As a result of the closure of the Russian division of Condé Nast, £5.1 million had to be wrote off by Condé Nast International.

=== In Vogue ===
In Vogue was a yearly special issue dedicated different themes.

- 2012: The Nude in Vogue (Veruschka by Helmut Newton)
- 2013: Russia in Vogue (Sasha Luss by Mariano Vivanco)
- 2014: Cinema in Vogue (June Newton by Helmut Newton)
- 2015: Red in Vogue
- 2016: Parties in Vogue (Valery Kaufman by Patrick Demarchelier)
- 2017:
- 2018: Flowers in Vogue (Shalom Harlow by Irving Penn)
- 2019: Gold in Vogue (Erin O'Connor by Nick Knight)

== See also ==
- Vogue, American edition in publication since 1892
- List of Vogue Russia cover models, List of Russian Vogue cover models
