= Women Management =

Modeling agency

- Industry: Modeling agency
- Founded: 1988; 38 years ago
- Founder: Paul Rowland
- Headquarters: New York, Paris, Milan, Los Angeles

Women Management is a modeling agency with its headquarters in New York. It is a part of the Women International Agency Chain, which was established by Paul Rowland in the year 1988. In addition to its New York location, Women Management operates offices in Paris, Los Angeles, and Milan.

== Overview ==
Women Management is part of Elite World Group network. Manager Piero Piazzi became the President of Women Milan in 2017 after being the worldwide President and Nathalie Cros-Coitton is the managing director of Women Paris.

== Models ==
As of October 2026, Women Management represent these models in at least one market:

- Frida Aasen
- Loli Bahia
- Luna Bijl
- Mariacarla Boscono
- Akon Changkou
- Jourdan Dunn
- Anna Ewers
- Isabeli Fontana
- Alexina Graham
- Héloïse Guérin
- Ida Heiner
- Camille Hurel
- Mathilde Henning
- Anna Jagodzińska
- Jill Kortleve
- Rebecca Leigh Longendyke
- Joséphine Le Tutour
- Lara Mullen
- Felice Noordhoff
- Hanne Gaby Odiele
- Herieth Paul
- Natasha Poly
- Behati Prinsloo
- Lais Ribeiro
- Eva Riccobono
- Coco Rocha
- Vlada Roslyakova
- Viktoriya Sasonkina
- Anna Selezneva
- Iselin Steiro
- Julia Stegner
- Iris Strubegger
- Kasia Struss
- FeiFei Sun
- Amber Valletta
- Maartje Verhoef
- Nataša Vojnović

== See also ==
- List of modeling agencies
