= Natasha Poly =

Russian supermodel

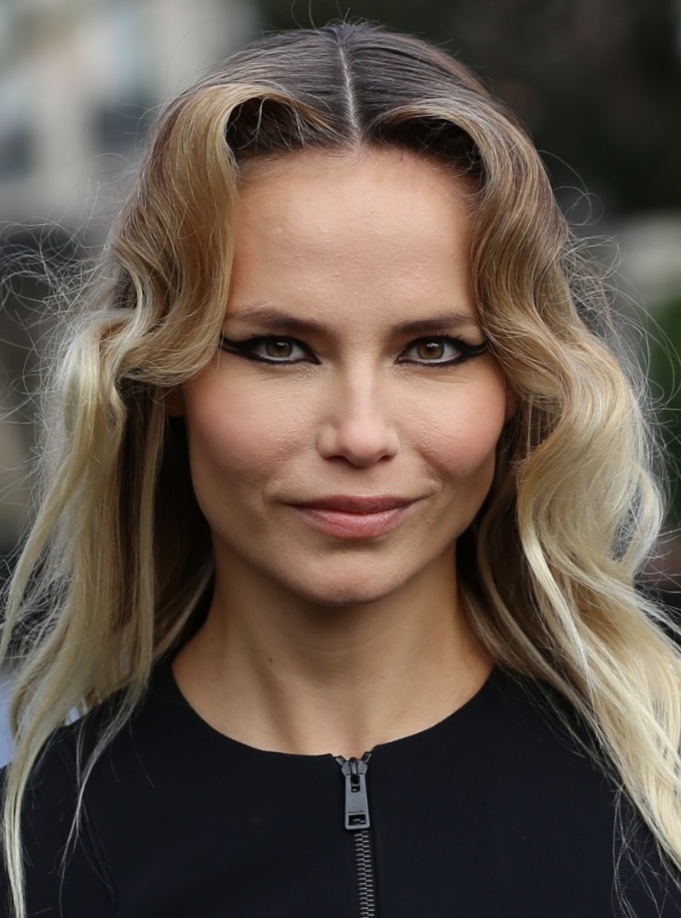
- Poly in 2020
- Born: Natalia Sergeevna Polevshchikova; 12 July 1985 (age 41); Perm, Perm Oblast, Russian SFSR, Soviet Union (Russia)
- Occupation: Supermodel
- Years active: 2003-present
- Spouse: Peter Bakker (m. 2011)
- Children: 2
- Modeling information
- Height: 1.78 m (5 ft 10 in)
- Hair color: Blonde
- Eye color: Hazel
- Agency: Elite Model Management (New York); Women Management (Milan, Paris); Select Model Management (London)

Natalia Sergeevna Polevshchikova (Russian: Наталья Серге́евна Полевщикова; born 12 July 1985), known professionally as Natasha Poly, is a Russian Supermodel. Since 2004, Poly has appeared in high-fashion advertisement campaigns, magazine covers, and on runways. Poly established herself as one of the most "in-demand models" of the mid and late 2000s, with Vogue Paris declaring her as one of the top 30 models of the 2000s. She has a total of 61 Vogue covers. Poly is known for her recognizable runway walk and signature pose, and is ranked as an icon by Models.com.

== Early life and career beginnings ==
Poly was born on 12 July 1985 in Perm, Russian SFSR, Soviet Union, and began modeling locally in 2000. Poly was discovered by Mauro Palmentieri at the age of 15, and was invited to Moscow to participate in the Russian model search competition "New Model Today", where she won second place. Poly made her runway debut with Why Not Model Agency after walking for Emanuel Ungaro in 2004. The year would prove to be her breakout year; she walked in 54 fashion shows in Milan, Paris and New York City, and modelled for the cover of Vogue Paris twice consecutively.

== Career ==
=== Early work: 2004–2005 ===
In 2004, Poly appeared in Alberta Ferreti's S/S 04 campaign and Louis Vuitton's jewelry campaign.

That same year, Poly made her debut at an Emanuel Ungaro show. Despite being new in the industry, Poly managed to walk 54 shows in 2004, modeling for prominent designers such as Alberta Ferreti, Calvin Klein, Fendi, Gucci, Oscar de la Renta, and Versus Versace. Poly is known for her distinctive look, consisting of her prominent cheekbones and a sexy figure, which led to her appearing in Australian Vogue, Russian Vogue, and French Vogue in the same year. In 2004, Poly appeared twice on the cover of Vogue Paris, once on the cover of Vogue Russia, and once on Vogue Australia.

In 2005, Poly appeared on the F/W 05 campaign for Roberto Cavalli. She appeared once more on the cover of Vogue Paris, alongside Mariacarla Boscono, and Vlada Roslyakova. That year, Poly walked 130 shows, particularly making a memorable appearance at the Victoria's Secret 2005 fashion show.

=== Rise to prominence: 2007–2010 ===
In 2007, Poly appeared in 250 fashion shows, including brands Alexander Mcqueen, Calvin Klein, Carolina Herrera, Donna Karan, Bill Blass and Oscar de la Renta.

Poly was one of several faces to headline one of the fourteen covers of V magazine's September 2008 issue. Each cover featured a head shot of a famous model, either from the new crop of leading models (Agyness Deyn, Lara Stone, Anja Rubik, Daria Werbowy, Masha Novoselova etc.) or the supermodel era (Christy Turlington, Naomi Campbell, Eva Herzigova). it was lensed by duo Inez van Lamsweerde and Vinoodh Matadin.

In 2008, Poly appeared on the advertisements for brands such as Louis Vuitton, Roberto Cavalli and Sonia Rykiel. In the Fall/ Winter 2008-2009 season, Poly appeared in seven advertising campaigns. Russian Vogue also dedicated a magazine cover to Natasha Poly.

Poly was placed 1st on Fashion Television's First Face countdown three times consecutively (Spring 2008, Fall 2008 and Spring 2009). She was also placed 7th (Spring 2007), 4th (Fall 2009 and Spring 2010) and 5th (Fall 2010). First Face countdown displays the models with the most number of shows opened during a season.

Vogue Paris declared her one of the top 30 models of the 2000s.

=== Continued success: 2010-present ===
In 2010, Poly appeared on ten Vogue covers, including twice on the cover of Vogue Paris and Vogue Russia. Poly also appeared in the advertising campaign for H&M.

In 2012, Poly made her first appearance for the Cannes festival while wearing a Gucci dress, as she made her appearance for the runway show in the same year. Poly was later chosen as the brand ambassador for L'Oreal.

Poly was part of the Versace Spring/Summer 2016 Campaign, alongside Gigi Hadid and Raquel Zimmermann, shot by Steven Klein. She also appeared in a commercial for Mercedes-Benz captured by Jeff Mark titled "Obsession with an Icon", in which Natasha fronted in a blue latex clad to the Mercedes-Benz SL car. She also became the face of Kurt Geiger's Fall/Winter 2016 Campaign.

Poly was part of the advertising campaign for Balmain S/S 17, along with supermodels Isabeli Fontana and Doutzen Kroes. In the same year, Poly appeared on the Dsquared² and Mugler campaign.

In 2023/2024 season, Poly appeared in several runway shows, such as Blumarine, Dolce&Gabbana, Michael Kors, Boss, Givenchy, and Mugler. For the 2024 Haute Couture season, Poly appeared in Schiaparelli and Fendi's Haute Couture show.

== Personal life ==
Poly married Dutch businessman Peter Bakker on 16 April 2011 in Saint-Tropez. On 13 May 2013, Poly gave birth to a daughter named Aleksandra Christina. On 30 March 2019, Poly gave birth to her second child, a son named Adrian Grey Bakker. As of 2020, Poly lived in Amsterdam with her family.
