= Blufin =

Italian fashion company

Coordinates: 44°47′23.4″N 10°52′44.4″E

Blufin S.p.A.
- Company type: Private
- Industry: Fashion
- Founded: 1977; 49 years ago, Carpi
- Founder: Anna Molinari, Gianpaolo Tarabini
- Headquarters: Carpi, Italy
- Number of locations: 55 shops
- Area served: Worldwide
- Key people: Marco Marchi (chairman of the board)
- Products: Womenswear
- Revenue: €102.4m (2006)
- Website: www.blufin.it

Blufin S.p.A. is an Italian fashion house founded by Anna Molinari and her late husband Gianpaolo Tarabini. The core brand is Blumarine, which they started in 1977, followed by Miss Blumarine (1987, 8- to 14-year-old girls), Blugirl (1995, for teenagers) and Anna Molinari (1995), which is being repositioned as their luxury brand.

== History ==
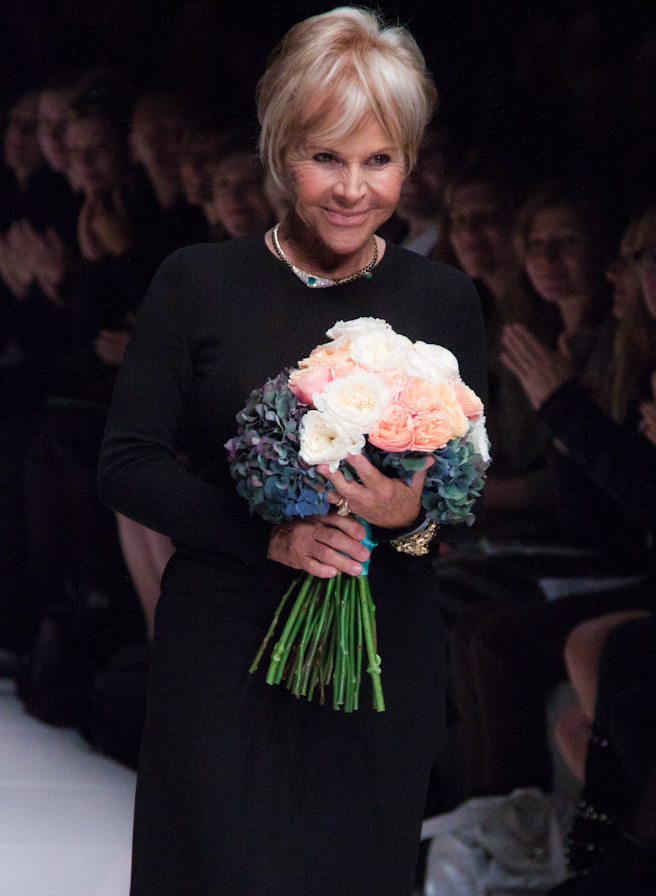
Anna Molinari in 2010

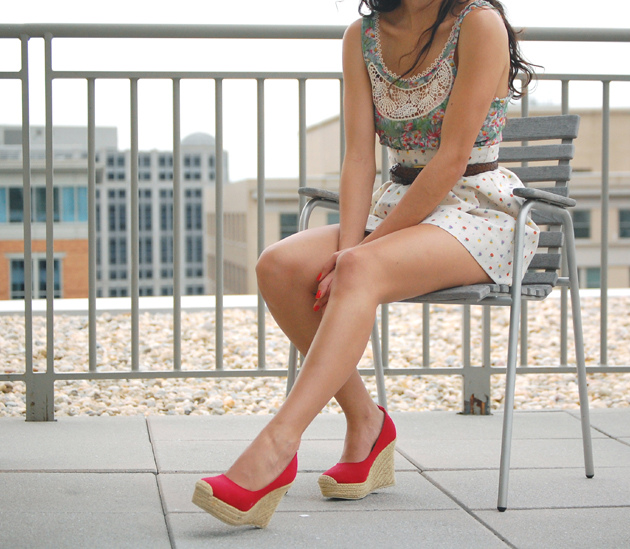
A Blumarine blouse

Blumarine was established by Anna Molinari and Gianpaolo Tarabini in 1977, in the town of Carpi in the province of Modena. The name was inspired by the couple's favourite colour and their love of the sea. In 1980 they made their first appearance at Modit in Milan, where Blumarine was named Designer of the Year, which led to their first show at Milan Fashion Week the following year. The 1986 Milan Fashion Week saw the first collection wholly designed by Anna Molinari.

As the brand took off and they started to license it to other companies, Blufin was set up in 1988 to act as a holding company. By 2006 royalties accounted for €5.5m of their income. The first Blumarine boutique was opened in the Via della Spiga, Milan in 1990; the company now sells at more than 1000 retail outlets, of which 55 are own-brand boutiques. In July 2011 the company collection was presented at the catwalk of The Brandery fashion show in Barcelona.

== Brands ==
The core brand is Blumarine, which has also been licensed to other companies in the fields of lingerie, accessories, wristwatches, homeware and so on; the perfume licence is held by ICR-ITF. In 2007, the company announced that it would be bringing bags and small leather accessories in-house, with a dedicated display area in the Milan shop at Via Montenapoleone 20. A major international expansion of Blumarine boutiques was then also planned, particularly in the Middle East and Asia.

The same is true of the Blugirl brand for young women, launched in 1995 and shown in the Milan international fashion shows since 2002. Dedicated boutiques have been opened in Rome, Milan, Naples, Paris, Kyiv, Kyoto, Nagoya, Taipei, Guangzhou, Hangzhou, Shanghai, Shenzhen, Beijing, and Seoul. Blugirl Folies is a brand launched in the market in 2007, aimed at younger teenage girls, integrating the Blugirl line.

The Anna Molinari brand is the Blufin brand specialized in the field of pret à porter and luxury clothing, designed from 1995 to 2004 by the daughter of the founder Rossella Tarabini.

In February 2015, the company launched a male fashion line, Blu Sport, at Milan Fashion Week.

For its advertising campaigns, the company has been working with several high-profile photographers, including Albert Watson (1990), Helmut Newton (1993–1995), Michel Comte (1997), Ellen von Unwerth (1997), Paolo Roversi (1997–1998), Tim Walker (2001–2003), Terry Richardson (2001–2002), Craig McDean and Pamela Hanson.

== Personal life ==
Anna Molinari has received many awards, of which the most notable are perhaps the Isimbardi Fashion Award in 2001, and a La Kore Fashion Oscar ion 2003. She has also been involved with many charities, such as the Italian Osteoporosis League and the rehabilitation of prisoners. Creative director of the Blumarine and Blugirl brands, Anna Molinari is nicknamed queen of roses, due to her love for these magical and sensual flowers.

As mentioned above, the couple's daughter Rossella is a designer for the company. Her brother Gianguido Tarabini joined the company in 1992, became Director of Licensing in 2004, and since the death of his father in 2006 has been the CEO in charge of all the company's commercial affairs and responsible for the Hotel Touring owned directly by his mother, separately from Blufin.

== See also ==
- Italian fashion
- Made in Italy
