= List of Harper's Bazaar Indonesia cover models =

This list of Harper's Bazaar Indonesia cover models (2000–present) is a catalog of cover models who have appeared on the cover of Harper's Bazaar Indonesia, the Indonesian edition of American fashion magazine Harper's Bazaar.

== 2000s ==
=== 2000 ===
Issue	Cover model	Photographer
June		
July		
August		
September		
October		
November		
December		

=== 2001 ===
Issue	Cover model	Photographer
January		
February		
March		
April		
May		
June		
July		
August		
September		
October		
November		
December		

=== 2002 ===
Issue	Cover model	Photographer
January		
February		
March		
April		
May		
June		
July		
August		
September		
October		
November		
December		

=== 2003 ===
Issue	Cover model	Photographer
January		
February		
March		
April		
May		
June		
July		
August		
September		
October		
November		
December		

=== 2004 ===
Issue	Cover model	Photographer
January		
February		
March		
April		
May		
June		
July		
August		
September		
October		
November		
December		

=== 2005 ===
Issue	Cover model	Photographer
January	Ai Tominaga	
February		
March		
April		
May		
June		
July		
August		
September		
October		
November		
December		

=== 2006 ===
Issue	Cover model	Photographer
January		
February		
March		
April		
May		
June		
July		
August		
September		
October		
November		
December		

=== 2007 ===
Issue	Cover model	Photographer
January		
February		
March		
April		
May		
June		
July		
August		
September		
October		
November		
December		

=== 2008 ===
Issue	Cover model	Photographer
January		
February		
March		
April		
May		
June		
July		
August		
September		
October		
November		
December		

=== 2009 ===
Issue	Cover model	Photographer
January	Angelina Jolie	Max Vadukul
February		
March		
April		
May		
June		
July		
August		
September		
October		
November		
December		

== 2010s ==
=== 2010 ===
Issue	Cover model	Photographer
October	Jennifer Aniston	Alexi Lubomirski
November	Drew Barrymore	Mark Seliger
December	Gisele Bündchen	Cedric Buchet

=== 2011 ===
Issue	Cover model	Photographer
January	Jessica Alba	Giuliano Bekor
February	Emily Blunt	Paola Kudacki
March	Nicole Kidman	Alexi Lubomirski
April	Kim Kardashian	Terry Richardson
May	Courteney Cox	Terry Richardson
June	Lady Gaga	Terry Richardson
July	Gwyneth Paltrow	Alexi Lubomirski
August	Britney Spears	Alexi Lubomirski
September	Anne Hathaway	Alexi Lubomirski
October	Beyoncé	Alexi Lubomirski
November	Cindy Crawford	Simon Upton
December	Kate Winslet	Tom Munro

=== 2012 ===
Issue	Cover model	Photographer
January	Madonna & Andrea Riseborough	Tom Munro
February	Janet Jackson	Alan Gelati
March	Naomi Watts	Víctor Demarchelier
April	Christy Turlington	Simon Upton
May	Uma Thurman	Mark Seliger
June	Gwyneth Paltrow	Terry Richardson
July	Penélope Cruz	Terry Richardson
August	Kate Moss	Terry Richardson
September	Rihanna	Camilla Åkrans
October	Gwen Stefani	Terry Richardson
November	Kate Hudson	Camilla Åkrans
December	Keira Knightley	Ellen von Unwerth

=== 2013 ===
Issue	Cover model	Photographer
January	Salma Hayek	Paola Kudacki
February	Liv Tyler	Nicoline Patricia Malina
March	Lara Stone	Kacper Kasprzyk
April	Drew Barrymore	Daniel Jackson
May	Karen Elson	Alexi Lubomirski
June		
July	Carey Mulligan	Tom Allen
August	Christy Turlington	Daniel Jackson
September	Tilda Lindstam & Lisa Verberght	Karl Lagerfeld
October	Sarah Jessica Parker	Terry Richardson
November	Matthew Terry & Bar Refaeli	Max von Gumppenberg & Patrick Bienert
December	Kimora Lee Simmons	Rinal Wiratama

=== 2014 ===
Issue	Cover model	Photographer
January	Georgia May Jagger	Xevi Muntane
February	Cate Blanchett	Ben Hassett
March	Keira Knightley	Alexi Lubomirski
April	Eva Herzigová	Nico Bustos
May	Jeon Ji Hyun	
June	Nicole Kidman	James White
July	Michelle Williams	Peter Lindbergh
August	Coco Rocha	Xevi Muntane
September	Linda Evangelista	Sebastian Faena
October	Charlize Theron	Nico Bustos
November	Katy Perry	Camilla Åkrans
December	Anne Hathaway	Alexi Lubomirski

=== 2015 ===
Issue	Cover model	Photographer
January	Jennifer Aniston	Melvin Sokolsky
February	Kylie & Dannii Minogue	Simon Lekias
March	Rosie Huntington-Whiteley	Anthony Maule
April	Rihanna	Norman Jean Roy
May	Julianne Moore	Camilla Åkrans
June	Nadya Hutagalung	Moreno & Co Photography
July	Emilia Clarke	Norman Jean Roy
August	Alexa Chung	David Slijper
September	Rosie Huntington-Whiteley	Jean-Paul Goude
October	Blake Lively	Trunk Xu
November	Sarah Jessica Parker	Alexi Lubomirski
December	Rachel Weisz	Tom Craig

=== 2016 ===
Issue	Cover model	Photographer
January	Kate Hudson	Terry Richardson
February	Lily James	Thomas Schenk
March	Reese Witherspoon	Alexi Lubomirski
April	Miranda Kerr	Nathaniel Goldberg
May	Elisa Sednaoui	Giovanni Gastel
June		
July	Jennifer Lawrence	Mario Sorrenti
August	Helena Bonham Carter	Tom Craig
September	Kim Kardashian & Kanye West	Karl Lagerfeld
October	Alicia Burke; Ash Foo; Leila Nda; Tiana Tolstoi; Mari Halang	Erik Madigan Heck
November	Mae Lapres	Ryan Tandya
December	Rosie Huntington-Whiteley	Alexi Lubomirski

=== 2017 ===
Issue	Cover model	Photographer
January	Felicity Jones	David Slijper
February	Yasmin & Amber Le Bon	Alan Gelati
March	Madonna	Luigi & Iango
April	Rihanna	Mariano Vivanco
May	Sienna Miller	Alexi Lubomirski
June		
July	Kendall Jenner	Camilla Åkrans
August	Karen Elson	Richard Phibbs
September	The Weeknd & Candice Swanepoel	Brigitte Lacombe
October	Kristen Stewart	Tom Craig
November	Aimee Song	Moreno & Co Photography
December	Julia Roberts	Alexi Lubomirski

=== 2018 ===
Issue	Cover model	Photographer
January	Emilia Clarke	Mariano Vivanco
February	Angelina Jolie	Alexi Lubomirski
March	Michelle Williams	Agata Pospieszynska
April	Selena Gomez	Alexi Lubomirski
May	Lily James	Richard Phibbs
June	Dian Sastrowardoyo	Davy Linggar
July	Nicholas Saputra & Laura Basuki	Vicky Tanzil
August	Winnie Harlow	Yu Tsai
September	Christina Aguilera	Mario Sorrenti
October	Taylor Swift	Alexi Lubomirski
November	Zoë Kravitz	Camilla Åkrans
December	Julia Roberts	Alexi Lubomirski

=== 2019 ===
Issue	Cover model	Photographer
January	Margot Robbie	Camilla Åkrans
February	Maudy Ayunda	Ryan Tandya
March	Saoirse Ronan	Erik Madigan Heck
April	Nicole Warne	Ryan Tandya
May	Lily James	Alexi Lubomirski
June	Dian Sastrowardoyo	Moreno & Co Photography
July	Velove Vexia	Moreno & Co Photography
August	Anggun	Raditya Bramantya
September	Celine Dion; Awkwafina	Mario Sorrenti
October	Laura Basuki	Ryan Tandya
November	Demi Moore	Mariano Vivanco
December	Kristen Stewart	Alexi Lubomirski

== 2020s ==
=== 2020 ===
Issue	Cover model	Photographer
January	Chelsea Islan	Ryan Tandya
February	Marsha Timothy & Sheila Timothy	Nicoline Patricia Malina
March	Emily Blunt	Pamela Hanson
April	Nagita Slavina	Vicky Tanzil
May	Luna Maya	Hadi Cahyono
June	Tiza Mafira; Riri Riza; Suzy Hutomo; Yenny Wahid; Nadya Hutagalung; Nadine Chandrawinata; Davina Veronica; Melanie Subono; Susi Pudjiastuti; Nicholas Saputra; Alamanda Shantika; Veronica Tan; Melati Wijsen; Isabel Wijsen; Najwa Shihab; Chitra Subyakto; Yori Antar Awal; Putri Tanjung; Farwiza Farhan; Riyanni Djangkaru	Anton Ismael
July	Demi Lovato	Alexi Lubomirski
August	Nadine Chandrawinata	Davy Linggar
September	Rihanna	Gray Sorrenti
October	NIKI	Natt Lim
November/December	Velove Vexia	Vicky Tanzil

=== 2021 ===
Issue	Cover model	Photographer
January/February	Sveta Jakobovic	Hadi Cahyono
March	Dian Sastrowardoyo	Hadi Cahyono
April	Laura Basuki	Ryan Tandya
May/June	Inka Williams	Nicoline Patricia Malina
July/August	Keira Knightley	Boo George
September	Beyoncé	Campbell Addy
October	Maudy Ayunda	Hadi Cahyono
November/December	Nicole Kidman	Collier Schorr

=== 2022 ===
Issue	Cover model	Photographer
January/February	BTS	Kang Hyea Won
March	Naomi Watts	Christopher Sturman
April	Tatjana Saphira	Vicky Tanzil
May	Jisoo	Kim Hee June
June	Eva Celia	Ryan Tandya
July/August	Renatta Moeloek	Hadi Cahyono
September	Amanda Gorman	John Edmonds
October	Bunga Citra Lestari	Hadi Cahyono
November	Pevita Pearce	Zaky Akbar
December/January 2023	Jessie Setiono	Nicoline Patricia Malina

=== 2023 ===
Issue	Cover model	Photographer
February	Anya Taylor-Joy	Georges Antoni
March	Mikha Tambayong	Wong Sim
April	Ayana Jihye Moon	Ryan Tandya
May	Kimmy Jayanti; Paula Verhoeven; Kelly Tandiono; Cissylia Stefani van Leeuwen; Tara Basro	Hadi Cahyono
June/July	Tatjana Saphira	Hilarius Jason
August	Putri Marino	Agung Ngurah Aditya
September	Kendall Jenner	Mario Sorrenti
September	Maudy Ayunda	Nicoline Patricia Malina
October	Mariana Renata	Nicoline Patricia Malina
November	Amanda Rawles	Kay Moreno
December/January 2024	Asmara Abigail	Iakovos Kalaitzakis

=== 2024 ===
Issue	Cover model	Photographer
February	Velove Vexia	Hilarius Jason
March	V	Kim Heejune
April	Nagita Slavina	Ryan Tandya
May	Raline Shah	Raditya Bramanta
June	Salvita Decorte	Nicoline Patricia Malina
July	Nikita Willy	Hilarius Jason
August	Luna Maya	Raditya Bramanta
September	Naomi Campbell	Malick Bodian
October	Tia Lee	Nicoline Patricia Malina
November	Bunga Citra Lestari	Nicoline Patricia Malina
December/January 2025	Jessie Setiono	Joel Low

=== 2025 ===
Issue	Cover model	Photographer
February	Miley Cyrus	Ethan James Green
March	Putri Marino	Sharon Angelia
April	Maudy Ayunda	Indra Leonardi
May	Raisa	Ryan Tandya
June	Julie Estelle	Nicoline Patricia Malina
July	Jackson Wang	Nicoline Patricia Malina
August	Luna Maya	Tommy Hartanto
September	Marsha Timothy	Nicoline Patricia Malina
September	Karina	Go Wontae
October	Nicholas Saputra	Raditya Bramanta
November	Laura Basuki	Zaky Akbar
December/January 2026	Jennifer Aniston	Emma Summerton

=== 2026 ===
Issue	Cover model	Photographer
February	Kornnaphat Sethratanapong	Waroon Kieattisin
March	Amanda Rawles	Hilarius Jason
April	Afgan	Kay Moreno
May	Anne Hathaway	Inez and Vinodh
June	Hege Socha	Ryan Tandya
July	Pevita Pearce	Hendra Kusuma
August	Luna Maya	Hilarius Jason
September	Celine Dion	Robin Galiegue
