= List of Harper's Bazaar Australia/New Zealand cover models =

This list of Harper's Bazaar Australia/New Zealand cover models (1984–1990; 1998–2020; 2021–present) is a catalog of cover models who have appeared on the cover of Harper's Bazaar Australia/New Zealand, the Australian and New Zealand edition of American fashion magazine Harper's Bazaar.

The publication was named Harper's Bazaar Australia from 1984 to 1990 and then Harper's Bazaar & Mode from 1998 to 1999 and then Harper's Bazaar Australia till 2020 and it was then relaunched as Harper's Bazaar Australia/New Zealand in 2021.

== 1980s ==
=== 1984 ===
Issue	Cover model	Photographer/Illustrator
September		
October	—N/a	
November	Esther Tomsic	Ken Middleton
December	Boy George	Bill Ling

=== 1985 ===
Issue	Cover model	Photographer
January	Stephane	Stevie Hughes
February		
March		
April		
May		
June	Lauren Helm	
July	Anette Dillahay	
August		Stevie Hughes
September		
October	Laura Viviana	
November		
December	Kerry Kenny	

=== 1986 ===
Issue	Cover model	Photographer
January/February	Tracy Wilson	Manteola
March		
April	Michelle Eabry	Franck Thiery
May		
June		
July	Sarah Futter	
August	Lisa Marten	
September		
October	Victoria Lockwood	Franck Thiery
November	Romy Pecner	
December	Francoise Skeates	Alvarez

=== 1987 ===
Issue	Cover model	Photographer
January/February	Anna-Louise Gould	David Siqueiros
March		
April		
May	Rachel Hunter	Stevie Hughes
June	Sarah Odell	Stevie Hughes
July	Laurie Gehen-Marsden	Les Goldberg
August		
September	Sarah Odell	Patrick Lichfield
#36		
November	Paulina Porizkova	Francesco Scavullo
December	Paola Perez	

=== 1988 ===
Issue	Cover model	Photographer
January/February		Stevie Hughes
March	Rachel Hunter	Peggy Sirota
April		Frank Thierry
Spring/Summer		Mark Arbeit

=== 1989 ===
Issue	Cover model	Photographer
Autumn/Winter		Mark Arbeit
Spring		Notarberardino

== 1990s ==
=== 1990 ===
Issue	Cover model	Photographer
Autumn/Winter		

=== 1998 ===
Issue	Cover model	Photographer
March	Nicole Kidman	
April	Dannii Minogue	
May	Kylie Bax	Mark Liddell
June/July	Simone van Baal	
August	Lauren Hutton	
September	Eugenia Silva	
October	Valeria Mazza	
November	Adele McLain	
December	Bridget Hall	

=== 1999 ===
Issue	Cover model	Photographer
January/February	Meg Ryan	Patrick Demarchelier
March	Amber Valletta	Patrick Demarchelier
April	Elizabeth Hurley	Mark Abrahams
May	Madonna	Patrick Demarchelier
June/July	Aurélie Claudel	Wayne Maser
August	Tom Cruise	Patrick Demarchelier
September	Gisele Bündchen	Patrick Demarchelier
October	Bridget Hall	Patrick Demarchelier
November	Carmen Kass	Wayne Maser
December	Elizabeth Hurley	Patrick Demarchelier

== 2000s ==
=== 2000 ===
Issue	Cover model	Photographer
January/February	Eugenia Silva	
March	Kari-Anne Liverud	
April	Brooke Shields	
May	Jodhi Meares	
June/July	Nathalie Cox	
August	Gwyneth Paltrow	
September	Korina Longin	
October	Elle Macpherson	
November	Sarah Murdoch	
December	Christy Turlington	

=== 2001 ===
Issue	Cover model	Photographer
January/February	Susana Giménez	
March	Cameron Diaz	Craig McDean
April	Sarah Murdoch	Christopher Micaud
May	Nicole Kidman	Ellen von Unwerth
June/July	Sarah Wynter	Mark Liddell
August	Kate Hudson	Patrick Demarchelier
September	Charlize Theron	Mark Liddell
October	Eva Herzigová	Mark Liddell
November	Julia Roberts	Mikael Jansson
December	Nicole Kidman	Patrick Demarchelier

=== 2002 ===
Issue	Cover model	Photographer
January/February	Cate Blanchett	Patrick Demarchelier
March	Gisele Bündchen	Patrick Demarchelier
April	Meg Ryan	Patrick Demarchelier
May	Kate Moss	Sølve Sundsbø
June/July	Elle Macpherson	Graham Shearer
August	Cameron Diaz	Patrick Demarchelier
September	Naomi Watts	Simon Upton
October	Gisele Bündchen	Patrick Demarchelier
November	Drew Barrymore	Patrick Demarchelier
December	Cate Blanchett	Troy House

=== 2003 ===
Issue	Cover model	Photographer
January/February	Michelle Pfeiffer	Patrick Demarchelier
March	Jennifer Lopez	Peter Lindbergh
April	Gisele Bündchen	Patrick Demarchelier
May	Cindy Crawford	Simon Upton
June/July	Jennifer Aniston	Patrick Demarchelier
August	Drew Barrymore; Cameron Diaz; Lucy Liu	Patrick Demarchelier
September	Delta Goodrem	Troy House
October	Elle Macpherson	Graham Shearer
November	Sarah Wynter	Troy House
December	Madonna	Regan Cameron

=== 2004 ===
Issue	Cover model	Photographer
January/February	Nicole Kidman	Sam Haskins
March	Naomi Watts	Sam Haskins
April	Cate Blanchett	Alan Gelati
May	Angelina Jolie	Robert Erdmann
June/July	Drew Barrymore	Patrick Demarchelier
August	Elle Macpherson	Sam Haskins
September	Kylie Minogue	Tesh
October	Gisele Bündchen	Peter Lindbergh
November	Elizabeth Hurley	
December	Nicole Kidman	Thomas Schenk

=== 2005 ===
Issue	Cover model	Photographer
January/February	Natalie Imbruglia	Alan Gelati
March	Cate Blanchett	Sam Haskins
April	Gwen Stefani	Alexi Lubomirski
May	Teri Hatcher	Alexi Lubomirski
June/July	Angelina Jolie	Yariv Milchan
August	Drew Barrymore	Inez & Vinoodh
September	Renée Zellweger	Alexi Lubomirski
October	Ashley Olsen	Peter Lindbergh
November	Demi Moore	Alexi Lubomirski
December	Gwyneth Paltrow	Wolfgang Ludes

=== 2006 ===
Issue	Cover model	Photographer
January/February	Catherine Zeta-Jones	Alexi Lubomirski
March	Kate Winslet	Peter Lindbergh
April	Cate Blanchett	Daniel Smith
May	Madonna	Sølve Sundsbø
June/July	Sharon Stone	Andrew Richardson
August	Mary-Kate Olsen	Daniel Smith
September	Jennifer Aniston	Alexi Lubomirski
October	Lindsay Lohan	Alexi Lubomirski
November	Victoria Beckham	Thiemo Sander
December	Kirsten Dunst	Alexei Hay

=== 2007 ===
Issue	Cover model	Photographer
January/February	Jennifer Lopez	Alexi Lubomirski
March	Cameron Diaz & Kate Winslet	Peter Lindbergh
April	Mischa Barton	Peter Lindbergh
May	Katie Holmes	Peter Lindbergh
June/July	Gwen Stefani	Peter Lindbergh
August	Paris Hilton & Nicole Richie	Peter Lindbergh
September	Reese Witherspoon	Peter Lindbergh
October	Jennifer Hawkins	Justin Smith
November	Kate Hudson	Peter Lindbergh
December	Cate Blanchett	Justin Smith

=== 2008 ===
Issue	Cover model	Photographer
January/February	Jennifer Aniston	Alexi Lubomirski
March	Nicole Kidman	Alan Gelati
April	Jennifer Lopez	Peter Lindbergh
May	Naomi Watts	Hugh Stewart
June/July	Kate Bosworth	Simon Lekias
August	Gwyneth Paltrow	Peter Lindbergh
September	Uma Thurman	Craig McDean
October	Teresa Palmer	Simon Lekias
November	Eva Mendes	Simon Lekias
December	Nicole Kidman	Alan Gelati

=== 2009 ===
Issue	Cover model	Photographer
January/February	Angelina Jolie	Max Vadukul
March	Kate Hudson	Cliff Watts
April	Scarlett Johansson	Alexi Lubomirski
May	Sarah Jessica Parker	Peter Lindbergh
June/July	Gisele Bündchen	Peter Lindbergh
August	Drew Barrymore	Alexi Lubomirski
September	Sienna Miller	Pavel Havlicek
October	Jennifer Aniston	Brian Bowen Smith
November	Jennifer Hawkins	Georges Antoni
December	Miranda Kerr	Simon Lekias

== 2010s ==
=== 2010 ===
Issue	Cover model	Photographer
January/February	Victoria Beckham	Alexi Lubomirski
March	Kate Hudson	Peter Lindbergh
April	Mia Wasikowska	Paul Jasmin
May	Lily Allen	Alan Gelati
June/July	Georgia Fowler, Bambi Northwood-Blyth, Juliana Forge, Meg Lindsay, Stephanie Cherry	Simon Lekias
August	Jennifer Aniston	Alexi Lubomirski
September	Elle Macpherson	Jason Kibbler
October	Gisele Bündchen	Cedric Buchet
November	Amanda Ware	Simon Lekias
December	Bambi Northwood-Blyth	Victor Demarchelier

=== 2011 ===
Issue	Cover model	Photographer
January/February	Jessica Alba	Giuliano Bekor
March	Nicole Kidman	Alexi Lubomirski
April	Abbie Cornish	Benny Horne
May	Cate Blanchett	Will Davidson
June/July	Jack Vanderhart, Bambi Northwood-Blyth	Lachlan Bailey
August	Mia Wasikowska	Will Davidson
September	Karlie Kloss	Victor Demarchelier
October	Alexa Chung	Angelo Pennetta
November	Miranda Kerr	Simon Lekias
December	Montana Cox	Pierre Toussaint

=== 2012 ===
Issue	Cover model	Photographer
January/February	Naomi Watts	Victor Demarchelier
March	Jessica Stam	Victor Demarchelier
April	Taylor Swift	Benny Horne
May	Gwyneth Paltrow	Terry Richardson
June/July	Nicole Kidman	Will Davidson
August	Kate Moss	Terry Richardson
September	Constance Jablonski	Victor Demarchelier
October	Rose Byrne	Will Davidson
November	Emily Blunt	Jason Bell
December	Georgia May Jagger	Jason Kibbler

=== 2013 ===
Issue	Cover model	Photographer
January	Kate Bosworth	Steven Chee
February	Jennifer Hawkins	Simon Lekias
March	Lara Stone	Kacper Kasprzyk
April	Drew Barrymore	Daniel Jackson
May	Cate Blanchett	Steven Chee
June/July	Ash Walker	Georges Antoni
August	Elle Macpherson	Bryan Adams
September	Scarlett Johansson	Karl Lagerfeld
October	Rosie Huntington-Whiteley	Simon Upton
November	Melissa Juratowitch	Simon Upton
December	Nicole Kidman	James White

=== 2014 ===
Issue	Cover model	Photographer
January/February	Miranda Kerr	Terry Richardson
March	Rosie Huntington-Whiteley	Karl Lagerfeld
April	Coco Rocha	Todd Barry
May	Naomi Watts	James White
June/July	Jessica Hart	Simon Upton
August	Michelle Williams	Peter Lindbergh
September	Penélope Cruz	Sebastian Faena
October	Alessandra Ambrosio	Simon Upton
November	Diane Kruger	Nino Muñoz
December	Kylie Minogue, Dannii Minogue	Simon Lekias

=== 2015 ===
Issue	Cover model	Photographer
January/February	Rosie Huntington-Whiteley	Simon Upton
March	Miranda Kerr	Kai Z. Feng
April	Shanina Shaik	Simon Upton
May	Cate Blanchett	Tom Munro
June/July	Elle Macpherson	Simon Upton
August	Emily Baker	Steven Chee
September	Katy Perry	Jean-Paul Goude
October	Jessica Hart	Steven Chee
November	Lara Bingle	Russell James
December	Kate Upton	Victor Demarchelier

=== 2016 ===
Issue	Cover model	Photographer
January/February	Miranda Kerr	Steven Chee
March	Lily Collins	David Roemer
April	Natalie Portman	Alique
May	Daria Werbowy	Nico Bustos
June/July	Heidi Klum	Rankin
August	Bella Hadid	Georges Antoni
September	Kim Kardashian, Kanye West	Karl Lagerfeld
October	Rosie Huntington-Whiteley	Pamela Hanson
November	Hailey Baldwin	Darren McDonald
December	Karmen Pedaru	Sylvè Colless

=== 2017 ===
Issue	Cover model	Photographer
January/February	Jesinta Franklin	Nick Leary
March	Georgia Fowler	Darren McDonald
April	Christy Turlington	Norman Jean Roy
May	Lara Bingle	Sylvè Colless
June/July	Elle Macpherson	Nick Leary
August	Emily Ratajkowski	Pamela Hanson
September	Kristen Stewart	Tom Craig
October	Kate Moss	Nikolai von Bismarck
November	Miranda Kerr	Nino Muñoz
December	Julia Roberts	Alexi Lubomirski

=== 2018 ===
Issue	Cover model	Photographer
January/February	Carolyn Murphy	Nino Muñoz
March	Margot Robbie	Max Doyle
April	Jennifer Lawrence	Ben Hassett
May	Georgia Fowler	Sylvè Colless
June/July	Rosie Huntington-Whiteley	Darren McDonald
August	Lara Bingle	Darren McDonald
September	Cate Blanchett	Steven Chee
October	Barbara Palvin	David Roemer
November	Phoebe Tonkin	Éric Guillemain
December	Gemma Ward	Georges Antoni

=== 2019 ===
Issue	Cover model	Photographer
January/February	Gisele Bündchen	Nino Muñoz
March	Taylor Hill	Mario Sorrenti
April	Ashley Graham	Nino Muñoz
May	Alicia Vikander	Mariano Vivanco
June/July	Elsa Pataky	Pierre Toussaint
August	Naomi Watts	Darren McDonald
September	Carolyn Murphy	Darren McDonald
October	Teresa Palmer	Darren McDonald
November	Samara Weaving	Darren McDonald
December	Victoria Lee; Alexandra Agoston; Gemma Ward; Georgia Fowler; Charlee Fraser	Darren McDonald

== 2020s ==
=== 2020 ===
Issue	Cover model	Photographer
January/February	Reese Witherspoon	Camilla Åkrans
March	Rosie Huntington-Whiteley	Darren McDonald
April	Gisele Bündchen	Kevin O'Brien
May	Elle Macpherson	Darren McDonald
June/July	Julia van Os	Regan Cameron

=== 2021 ===
Issue	Cover model	Photographer
October	Nakkiah Lui	Bec Parsons
November	Margaret Qualley	Deirdre Lewis
December	Akon Changkou	Rory van Millingen

=== 2022 ===
Issue	Cover model	Photographer
January/February	Diana Silvers	Cass Bird
March	Aylah Peterson	Darren McDonald
April	Rita Ora	Simon Eeles
May	Yael Stone, Julia Savage	Bec Parsons
June/July	Samara Weaving	Ben Morris
August	Emma McKeon	Jess James
September	Hailey Bieber	John Edmonds
October	Bad Bunny	John Edmonds
November	Tilda Swinton	Sølve Sundsbø
December	Anya Taylor-Joy	Georges Antoni

=== 2023 ===
Issue	Cover model	Photographer
January	Gemma Ward, Holly Rose Emery	Adrian Price
February	Shanina Shaik	Bec Parsons
March	Kelela	Lucie Rox
April	Milly Alcock	Bryan Liston
May	Miranda Kerr	Nino Muñoz
June/July	Jennifer Coolidge	Polly Borland
August	Sydney Sweeney	Simon Eeles
September	Doja Cat	Mario Sorrenti
October	Margaret Qualley	Amy Troost
November	Saoirse Ronan	Agata Pospieszynska
December	Alycia Debnam-Carey	Darren McDonald

=== 2024 ===
Issue	Cover model	Photographer
January	Phoebe Tonkin	Darren McDonald
February	Angourie Rice	Simon Eeles
March	Maisie Williams	Agata Pospieszynska
April	Elle Macpherson	James Tolich
May	Olivia DeJonge	Jess Ruby James
June/July	Rosie Huntington-Whiteley	Darren McDonald
August	Hannah Dodd	Andrew Nuding
September	Lily Collins	Benjamin Becker
October	Emma McKeon	Georges Antoni
November	Riley Keough	David Roemer
December	Sophie Turner	Emma Summerton

=== 2025 ===
Issue	Cover model	Photographer
January	Naomi Osaka	John Russo
January	Aryna Sabalenka	John Russo
February	Xiao Wen Ju	Jacky Tam
March	Rihanna	Luis Alberto Rodriguez
April	Jisoo	Go Wontae
May	Teresa Palmer	Bec Parsons
June/July	Jessica Hart	Georges Antoni
August	Isla Fisher	James Anastasi
September	Dua Lipa	Anthony Seklaoui
October	Aylah Peterson	Emma Summerton
November	Aleyna FitzGerald	Holly Gibson
December	Maia Mitchell	Georges Antoni

=== 2026 ===
Issue	Cover model	Photographer
January	Gabriella Brooks	Simon Upton
February	Natalia Vodianova	Alvaro Gracia
March	Yerin Ha	Pierre Toussaint
April	Léa Seydoux	Colin Dodgson
May	Phoebe Tonkin	Georges Antoni
July	Elizabeth Debicki	Justin Ridler
August	Amy Shark	Oliver Begg
September	Rosie Huntington-Whiteley	Nico Bustos
October	Elle Macpherson	Simon Upton
November	Marion Cotillard	Louie Banks

== See also ==
- List of Vogue Australia cover models
