= List of Harper's Bazaar Arabia cover models =

This list of Harper's Bazaar Arabia cover models (2007–present) is a catalog of cover models who have appeared on the cover of Harper's Bazaar Arabia, the Arab edition of American fashion magazine Harper's Bazaar.

== 2000s ==
=== 2007 ===
Issue	Cover model	Photographer
March	Shakira	Robert Erdmann
April	Katie Holmes	Peter Lindbergh
May	Drew Barrymore	Peter Lindbergh
June	Gwen Stefani	Peter Lindbergh
July	Dita Von Teese	
August	Paris Hilton & Nicole Richie	Peter Lindbergh
September	Reese Witherspoon	Peter Lindbergh
October	Thandie Newton	Jonathan Browning
November	Kate Hudson	Peter Lindbergh
December	Jennifer Aniston	Alexi Lubomirski

=== 2008 ===
Issue	Cover model	Photographer
January	Diane Kruger	Hamish Brown
February	Cate Blanchett	
March	Naomi Campbell	Mark Abrahams
April	Nicole Kidman	Alan Gelati
May	Demi Moore	Peter Lindbergh
June	Christina Ricci	Pavel Havlicek
July/August	Nicole Richie	Peter Lindbergh
September	Gwyneth Paltrow	Peter Lindbergh
October	Victoria Beckham	Pavel Havlicek
November	Kate Bosworth	Simon Lekias
December	Alicia Keys	Pavel Havlicek

=== 2009 ===
Issue	Cover model	Photographer
January	Daria Werbowy	Alan Gelati
February	Kate Hudson	Cliff Watts
March	Ashley Olsen	Pavel Havlicek
April	Freida Pinto	Pavel Havlicek
May	Chanel Iman	Carter Berg
June	Gisele Bündchen	Peter Lindbergh
July/August	Sienna Miller	Pavel Havlicek
September	Paris Hilton	Alan Gelati
October	Beyoncé	Peter Lindbergh
November	Naomi Campbell	François Nars
December	Victoria Beckham	Alexi Lubomirski

== 2010s ==
=== 2010 ===
Issue	Cover model	Photographer
January	Sharon Stone	Alix Malka
February	Kate Hudson	Peter Lindbergh
March	Diane Kruger	Ellen von Unwerth
April		
May	Jennifer Aniston	Alexi Lubomirski
June	Demi Moore	Mark Seliger
July/August	Amber Heard	Guy Aroch
September	Cameron Diaz	Terry Richardson
October	Nicole Richie	Pavel Havlicek
November	Natalia Vodianova	Michelangelo Di Battista
December	Drew Barrymore	Mark Seliger

=== 2011 ===
Issue	Cover model	Photographer
January	Lily Donaldson	Terry Richardson
February	Nicole Kidman	Alexi Lubomirski
March	Kim Kardashian	Terry Richardson
April	Gwyneth Paltrow	Alexi Lubomirski
May	Lady Gaga	Terry Richardson
June	Britney Spears	Alexi Lubomirski
July/August	Gem Refoufi	
September	Elisabetta Canalis	John Russo
October	Kim Kardashian	John Russo
November	Janet Jackson	Alan Gelati
December	Paula Patton	John Russo

=== 2012 ===
Issue	Cover model	Photographer
January	Kate Beckinsale	John Russo
February	Madonna	Tom Munro
March	Irina Shayk	Pavel Havlicek
April	Rosie Huntington-Whiteley	Tom Munro
May	Mila Kunis	Terry Richardson
June	Georgia May Jagger	Natalia Alaverdian
July/August	Kate Moss	Terry Richardson
September	Zoe Saldaña	John Russo
October	Hanaa Ben Abdesslem	Michelle Ferrara
November	Kate Hudson	Camilla Åkrans
December	Vanessa Hudgens	John Russo

=== 2013 ===
Issue	Cover model	Photographer
January	Sienna Miller	David Slijper
February	Georgia May Jagger	Jason Kibbler
March	Jennifer Lopez	Katja Rahlwes
April	Kendall Jenner	John Russo
May	Drew Barrymore	Daniel Jackson
June	Anne Vyalitsyna	John Russo
July/August	Rita Ora	Benoit Peverelli
September	Olivia Wilde	Pavel Havlicek
October	Nancy Ajram	Mara Desipris
November	Alicia Keys	Yu Tsai
December	Kate Hudson	Alexi Lubomirski

=== 2014 ===
Issue	Cover model	Photographer
January	Lais Ribeiro	John Russo
February	Naomie Harris	Mara Desipris
March	Karolína Kurková	Karl Lagerfeld
April	Keira Knightley	Emily Hope
May	Alessandra Ambrosio	Bleacher + Everard
June	Freida Pinto	Mathieu Cesar
July/August	Rihanna	Ruvén Afanador
September	Lady Gaga	Sebastian Faena
October	Charlize Theron	Nico Bustos
November	Kate Mara	John Russo
December	Sarah Jessica Parker	Alexei Hay

=== 2015 ===
Issue	Cover model	Photographer
January	Shanina Shaik	John Russo
February	Olga Kurylenko	Ralph Wenig
March	Gwyneth Paltrow	Alexi Lubomirski
April	Megan Fox	John Russo
May	Rosie Huntington-Whiteley	Miguel Reveriego
June	Kristen Stewart	Alexi Lubomirski
July/August	Erin Wasson	Christopher Ferguson
September	Katy Perry	Jean-Paul Goude
October	Elisa Sednaoui	Jon Cardwell
November	Chanel Iman	Silja Magg
December	Sonam Kapoor	Kurt Iswarienko

=== 2016 ===
Issue	Cover model	Photographer
January	Sama & Haya Khadra	Rene & Radka
February	Kate Hudson	Terry Richardson
March	Sofía Vergara	Matthias Vriens-McGrath
April	Nina Abdel Malak	Silja Magg
May	Jennifer Lawrence	Mario Sorrenti
June	Daria Werbowy	Nico Bustos
July/August	Afef Jnifen	Ellen von Unwerth
September	Kim Kardashian & Kanye West	Karl Lagerfeld
October	Huda Kattan	Williams & Hirakawa
November	Negin Mirsalehi	Silja Magg
December	Lily James	David Burton

=== 2017 ===
Issue	Cover model	Photographer
January	Jessica Kahawaty	Rene & Radka
February	Coco Rocha	Alexei Hay
March	Shanina Shaik; Hind Sahli; Hanaa Ben Abdesslem	Ellen von Unwerth
April	Lameka Fox; Grace Mahary; Ajak Deng; Jourdana Elizabeth; Nykhor Paul	Silja Magg
May	Salma Hayek	Xevi Muntane
June	Sofia Boutella	Jan Welters
July/August	Kendall Jenner	Camilla Åkrans
September	Kim Kardashian	Mariano Vivanco
October	Bella Hadid	Victor Demarchelier
November	Sonia Ben Ammar	David Slijper
December	Lily Aldridge	Alexi Lubomirski

=== 2018 ===
Issue	Cover model	Photographer
January	Emily Ratajkowski	Pamela Hanson
February	Priyanka Chopra	David Slijper
March	Joan Smalls	Mariano Vivanco
April	Rosie Huntington-Whiteley	Mariano Vivanco
May	Nadine Nassib Njeim	Benoit Peverelli
June	Yara Shahidi	Taylor Tupy
July/August	Taleedah Tamer	Stefania Paparelli
September	Christina Aguilera	Mario Sorrenti
October	Bella Hadid	Mariano Vivanco
November	Yasmine Sabri	Greg Swales
December	Aiysha Hart	Lucia O'Connor-McCarthy

=== 2019 ===
Issue	Cover model	Photographer
January	Úrsula Corberó	Greg Swales
February	Maya Diab	Jeremy Choh
March	Queen Rania	Alexi Lubomirski
April	Mai Omar	Mohamad Seif
May	Dana Hourani	Kristan Schuller
June	Naomi Scott	Taylor Tupy
July/August	Kris & Kylie Jenner	Luca & Alessandro Morelli
September	Saba Mubarak & Yousra	Ram Shergill
October	Nadine Labaki	Vladimir Marti
November	Emon Shakoor will.i.am Sara Al Madani	Greg Swales
December	Alessandra Ambrosio	Yulia Gorbachenko

== 2020s ==
=== 2020 ===
Issue	Cover model	Photographer
January	Shanina Shaik	Greg Swale
February	Halima Aden	Yulia Gorbachenko
March	Sonam Kapoor	Éric Guillemain
April	Karen Wazen	Greg Adamski
May	Feriel Moulaï	Ziga Mihelcic
Summer (June/July/August)	Cynthia A and Livia	Toufic Araman
September	Yara Shahidi	Greg Swales
October	Mina El Hammani	Vladimir Marti
November	May Calamawy	Jamie Nelson
December	Tsheca White	Caleb & Gladys

=== 2021 ===
Issue	Cover model	Photographer
January	Balqees Fathi	Paul Morel
February	Iman	Paola Kudacki
March	Azza Slimene	Kristian Schuller
April	Raya Abirached	Xavi Gordo
May		
June		
July/August		
September		
October		
November		
December	Mariana Santana	Arash Khaksari

=== 2022 ===
Issue	Cover model	Photographer
January		
February	Priyanka Chopra	The Morelli Brothers
March		
April		
May		
June		
July/August		
September	Tara Emad	
October		
November		
December		

=== 2023 ===
Issue	Cover model	Photographer
January		
February		
March		
April		
May		
June		
July/August		
September		
October		
November		
December		

=== 2024 ===
Issue	Cover model	Photographer
January		
February		
March	Iman	AB & DM
April	Sara Sampaio	Daniella Midenge
May	Amina Muaddi	Desiree Mattsson
June	Amira Al Zuhair	Giulio Rustichelli
July/August	Huda Kattan	Desiree Mattsson
September	Joan Collins	
October	Pritika Swarup	Vladimir Martí
November		
December	Saffron Vadher	Élio Nogueira
Winter	Jasmine Tookes	Paolo Zambaldi

=== 2025 ===
Issue	Cover model	Photographer
January	Elyanna	Mariano Vivanco
February	Rania Benchegra	Jack Waterlot
March	Tuba Büyüküstün	Simon Lipman
April	Christina Mourad Saab, Sophia Saab, Elie Saab Jr.	Mattia Guolo
April	Mohammed Al Turki, Afef Jnifen	Mattia Guolo
April	Karim Kamoun, Ons Jabeur	Mattia Guolo
April	Kira Yaghnam, Tara Abboud	Mattia Guolo
April	May Calamawy, Dina Shihabi	Mattia Guolo
April	Khaled Selim, Yousra	Mattia Guolo
April	Ahmed Malek, Tara Emad	Mattia Guolo
April	Kenza Fourati, Dora Bouchoucha	Mattia Guolo
April	Baris Arduç, Razane Jammal	Vladimir Marti
April	Aicel Ramzy, Sawsan Badr, Yasmina El-Abd	Vladimir Marti
April	Raya Abirached, Dhaffer L'Abidine	Vladimir Marti
April	Ahmed Kazim, Butheina Kazim	Vladimir Marti
May	Samantha Saba	Arthur Belebeau
June	Carmen Bsaibes	Álvaro Gracia
July/August	Helena Christensen	Greg Lothes
September	Saba Mubarak	Simon Lipman
October	Pooja Mor	Élio Nogueira
November	Nour Arida	David Slijper
December	Natalia Vodianova	Alvaro Gracia

=== 2026 ===
Issue	Cover model	Photographer
January	Azza Slimene	Álvaro Gracia
February	Lais Ribeiro	Vladimir Marti
March	Ugbad Abdi	Petros Kouiouris
April	Hend Al Otaiba	Fouad Tadros
May	Simone Ashley	JuanKr
June	Nadine Njeim	Álvaro Gracia
July/August	Valérie Abou Chacra	Emre Doğru
September	Loli Bahia	Inez & Vinoodh

== See also ==
- List of Vogue Arabia cover models
