= List of Harper's Bazaar Nederland cover models =

This list of Harper's Bazaar Nederland cover models (1986–1990; 2014–present) is a catalog of cover models who have appeared on the cover of Harper's Bazaar Nederland, the Dutch edition of American fashion magazine Harper's Bazaar. From 1986 to 1990 the magazine was named Harper's Bazaar Nederland & België, for the Netherlands and Flanders.

== 1980s ==
=== 1986 ===
Issue	Cover model	Photographer
Summer	Kirsten Allen	Marco Glaviano
Autumn/Winter	Catherine Oxenberg	Francesco Scavullo

=== 1987 ===
Issue	Cover model	Photographer
Summer	Renée Simonsen	Rico Puhlmann
September/October		
November/December	Brooke Shields	Rico Puhlmann

=== 1988 ===
Issue	Cover model	Photographer
January/February		
July/August		
November/December		

=== 1989 ===
Issue	Cover model	Photographer
January/February	Stephanie Seymour	
March/April		
June		
July	Tatjana Patitz	
August	Talisa Soto	
September	Claudia Mason, uncredited, uncredited	
October		
December		

== 1990s ==
=== 1990 ===
Issue	Cover model	Photographer
January		
February	Kimora Lee Simmons	
April	Angelika Kallio	

== 2010s ==
=== 2014 ===
Issue	Cover model	Photographer
September	Anna de Rijk	Wendelien Daan
September	Lara Stone	
October		
November	Kim Noorda	Mikael Schulz
December/January 2015	Nimue Smit	Mikael Schulz

=== 2015 ===
Issue	Cover model	Photographer
February		
March	Maartje Verhoef	Migjen Rama
April	Solomonica de Winter	Migjen Rama
May	Julianne Moore	Camilla Åkrans
June	Valentine Bouquet	Paul Scala
July/August	Querelle Jansen	Mikael Schulz
September	Katy Perry	Jean-Paul Goude
October	Ymre Stiekema	Pablo Delfos
November	Birgit Schuurman, Katja Schuurman	Jasper Abels
December	Marine Deleeuw	Angelo D'Agostino

=== 2016 ===
Issue	Cover model	Photographer
January/February	Sophie Hilbrand	Jeroen W. Mantel
March	Ari Westphal	Mikael Schulz
April	Nynke van Verschuer	Migjen Rama
May	Linda Spierings	Paul Scala
June	Nimue Smit	Mikael Schulz
July/August	Ellen de Weer	Duy Vo
September	Kanye West, Kim Kardashian	Karl Lagerfeld
October	Estella Boersma	Duy Vo
November	Damaris Goddrie	Duy Vo
December	Cato van Ee	Duy Vo

=== 2017 ===
Issue	Cover model	Photographer
January/February	Marlou van Rhijn	Wendelien Daan
March	Nimue Smit	Duy Vo
April	Christy Turlington	Norman Jean Roy
May	Jane Fonda	Nino Muñoz
June	Lameka Fox; Grace Mahary; Ajak Deng; Jourdana Elizabeth; Nykhor Paul	Silja Magg
July/August	Valentine Bouquet	Zoltan Tombor
September	Joan Smalls	Brigitte Lacombe
October	Mame Camara	Tim Verhallen
November	Carice van Houten	Jasper Abels
December	Danielle van Grondelle	Jan & Jorre

=== 2018 ===
Issue	Cover model	Photographer
January/February	Eva Jinek	Wendelien Daan
March	Nimue Smit	Petrovsky & Ramone
April	Michaela DePrince	Tim Verhallen
May	Jan de Villeneuve	Wendelien Daan
June	Kim van der Laan	Jasper Abels
July/August	Kim Noorda	Tim Verhallen
September	Christina Aguilera	Mario Sorrenti
October	Sophie Vlaming	Jan & Jorre
November	Takenya, Cipriana Quann	Mikael Schulz
December	Romy Schonberger	Tim Verhallen

=== 2019 ===
Issue	Cover model	Photographer
January/February	Querelle Jansen	Jan & Jorre
March	Cato van Ee	Jan & Jorre
April	Mila van der Horst	Tim Verhallen
May	Taylor Hill	Tina Tyrell
June	Anna Cleveland	Petrovsky & Ramone
July/August	Valentine Bouquet	Fleur Bult
September	Christy Turlington	Mario Sorrenti
October	Giedrė Dukauskaitė	Sebastian Kim
November	Kristen Stewart	Alexi Lubomirski
December	Akiima	Petrovsky & Ramone

== 2020s ==
=== 2020 ===
Issue	Cover model	Photographer
January/February	Halina Reijn	Wendelien Daan
March	Athalia Amah	Fleur Bult
April/May 'Business'	Negin Mirsalehi	Anna Daki
Summer	Illustration	
September	Rihanna	Gray Sorrenti
October/November	Lynn Palm	Tim Verhallen

=== 2021 ===
Issue	Cover model	Photographer
March	Aisha Musse	Philippe Vogelenzang
April/May	Iman	Paola Kudacki
Summer	Elise Schaap	Philippe Vogelenzang
September	Beyoncé	Campbell Addy
October/November	Michaela DePrince	Wikkie Hermkens
Winter	Sifan Hassan	Robin de Puy

=== 2022 ===
Issue	Cover model	Photographer
March	Marpessa Hennink, Mohamed Benchellal	Tim Verhallen
April/May 'Business'	Gia Bab, Olivia Lonsdale, Cherella Gessel	Robin de Puy
Summer	Adot	Andreas Ortner
September	Florence Pugh	John Edmonds
October/November	Marlou Fernanda	Passian Smit
Winter	Iris de Graaf	Robin de Puy

=== 2023 ===
Issue	Cover model	Photographer
March	Malin Groeneveld	Philippe Vogelenzang
April/May	Vivian Hoorn	Annelie Brujin
Summer	Anna Drijver	Anne Timmer
September	Kendall Jenner	Mario Sorrenti
October/November	Kelly Wearstler	Myrthe Giesbers
Winter	Karsu	Bastiaan Woudt

=== 2024 ===
Issue	Cover model	Photographer
March	Asia Piwka	Anouk Hart
April/May	Julianne Moore	David Roemer
Summer	Zoe Barnard	David Roemer
September	Linda Spierings	Jouke Bos
October/November	Gigi Ringel	Anouk Hart
Winter	Gerda Havertong	Martika Avalon

=== 2025 ===
Issue	Cover model	Photographer
March	Mariana Santana	Emre Grind
April/May	Rihanna	Luis Alberto Rodriguez
Summer	Kelly Rutherford, Hermés Rutherford	Lalo + Eva
September	Kate Moss	David Sims
October/November	Delfina Chaves	Carolina Sosa Abó
Winter	Geertje Govaert	Philippe Vogelenzang

=== 2026 ===
Issue	Cover model	Photographer
March	Kate van Berne	Janne Rugland
April/May	Emma Grede	Martika Avalon
Summer	Annemary Aderibigbe, Rosalieke Fuchs	Jaap Strijker
September	Celine Dion	Robin Galiegue
