= Lists of Harper's Bazaar cover models =

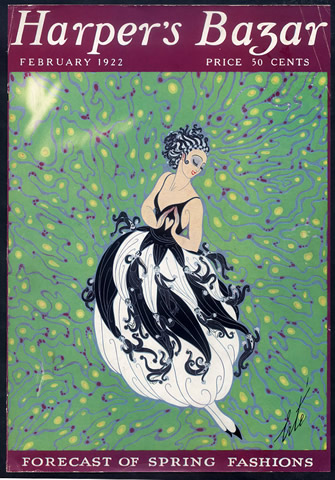
February 1922 cover, by Erté

The lists of Harper's Bazaar cover models gives the models for the covers of Harper's Bazaar magazine. The magazine has different editions in different countries, and the list is broken down by country.

== Models by country ==
- List of Harper's Bazaar US cover models
- List of Harper's Bazaar Arabia cover models
- List of Harper's Bazaar Argentina cover models
- List of Harper's Bazaar Australia/New Zealand cover models
- List of Harper's Bazaar Brasil cover models
- List of Harper's Bazaar Chile cover models
- List of Harper's Bazaar España cover models
- List of Harper's Bazaar France cover models
- List of Harper's Bazaar Germany cover models
- List of Harper's Bazaar India cover models
- List of Harper's Bazaar Indonesia cover models
- List of Harper's Bazaar Italia cover models
- List of Harper's Bazaar Japan cover models
- List of Harper's Bazaar Nederland cover models
- List of Harper's Bazaar Polska cover models
- List of Harper's Bazaar Russia cover models
- List of Harper's Bazaar Srbija cover models
- List of Harper's Bazaar UK cover models
- List of Harper's Bazaar Ukraine cover models
