= List of Harper's Bazaar Ukraine cover models =

This list of Harper's Bazaar Ukraine cover models (2011–2021; 2024–present) is a catalog of cover models who have appeared on the cover of Harper's Bazaar Ukraine, the Ukrainian edition of American fashion magazine Harper's Bazaar.

== 2000s ==
=== 2009 ===
Issue	Cover model	Photographer
January	Coco Rocha	Huyng Won Ryoo
February	Kate Hudson	Cliff Watts
March	Scarlett Johansson	Alexi Lubomirski
April	Sarah Jessica Parker	Peter Lindbergh
May	Jennifer Connelly	Paola Kudacki
June	Chanel Iman	Carter Berg
July/August	Sandra Bullock	Peter Lindbergh
September	Maryna Linchuk	Greg Kadel
October	Rachel Weisz	Cliff Watts
November	Kate Winslet	Peter Lindbergh
December	Lily Cole	Guy Aroch

== 2010s ==
=== 2010 ===
Issue	Cover model	Photographer
January	Claudia Schiffer	Michelangelo Di Battista
February	Victoria Beckham	Alexi Lubomirski
March	Julianne Moore	Paola Kudacki
April	Cindy Crawford	Cedric Buchet
May	Megan Fox	Paola Kudacki
June	Gwyneth Paltrow	Alexi Lubomirski
July	Jennifer Aniston	Alexi Lubomirski
August	Katherine Heigl	Alexi Lubomirski
September	Cameron Diaz	Terry Richardson
October		
November	Gisele Bündchen	Cedric Buchet
December	Drew Barrymore	Mark Seliger

=== 2011 ===
Issue	Cover model	Photographer
January	Katy Perry	Alexi Lubomirski
February	Lily Donaldson	Terry Richardson
March	Alina Baikova	Alexey Kolpakov
April	Gwyneth Paltrow	Alexi Lubomirski
May	Toni Garrn	Camilla Åkrans
June	Evelina Mambetova	Alexey Kolpakov
July	Eva Green	Camilla Åkrans
August	Claudia Schiffer	Horst Diekgerdes
September	Snejana Onopka	Pavel Havlicek
October	Alla Kostromichova	Alexey Kolpakov
November	Julia Saner	Daniel Jackson
December	Maria Rudkovskaya	Alexey Kolpakov

=== 2012 ===
Issue	Cover model	Photographer
January	Olga Kurylenko	Cédric van Mol
February	Madonna & Andrea Riseborough	Tom Munro
March	Natalia Chabanenko	Alexey Kolpakov
April	Alina Baikova	Alexey Kolpakov
May	Irina Shayk	Pavel Havlicek
June	Mila Kunis	Terry Richardson
July	Victoria Beckham	Camilla Åkrans
August	Kate Moss	Terry Richardson
September	Eva Herzigová	Alexey Kolpakov
October	Ella Kandyba	Alexey Kolpakov
November	Alla Kostromichova	Alexey Kolpakov
December	Antonina Vasylchenko	Alexey Kolpakov

=== 2013 ===
Issue	Cover model	Photographer
January	Lily Donaldson	Terry Richardson
February	Linda Vojtová	Pavel Havlicek
March	Monica Bellucci	Signe Vilstrup
April	Andy Nagy	Federica Putelli
May	Drew Barrymore	Daniel Jackson
June	Karen Elson	Alexi Lubomirski
July	Gwyneth Paltrow	Daniel Jackson
August	Christy Turlington	Daniel Jackson
September	Juju Ivanyuk	Federica Putelli
October	Natalia Chabanenko	Dima Honcharov
November	Ella Kandyba	Federica Putelli
December	Evelina Mambetova	Dima Honcharov

=== 2014 ===
Issue	Cover model	Photographer
January	Cate Blanchett	Ben Hassett
February	Kate Hudson	Alexi Lubomirski
March	Milou van Groesen	Federica Putelli
April	Eugenia Volodina	Federica Putelli
May	Sarah Jessica Parker	Alexi Lubomirski
June	Kate Moss	Terry Richardson
July/August	Nastya Timoshenko	Dima Honcharov
September	Stacy Martin	Sebastian Faena
October	Tosca Dekker	Federica Putelli
November	Kristina Salinovic	Federica Putelli
December	Yulia Lobova	Dima Honcharov

=== 2015 ===
Issue	Cover model	Photographer
January/February	Claire Danes	Alexi Lubomirski
March	Lara Stone	Anthony Maule
April	Rihanna	Norman Jean Roy
May	Gwyneth Paltrow	Alexi Lubomirski
June	Alyona Osmanova	
July/August	Julianne Moore	Camilla Åkrans
September	Katy Perry	Jean-Paul Goude
October	Nataliya Piro	Ksenia Kargina
November	Rosie Huntington-Whiteley	Alexi Lubomirski
December	Gabriella Wilde	Felix Cooper

=== 2016 ===
Issue	Cover model	Photographer
January	Irina Kravchenko	Antonina Zharko
February	Kate Hudson	Terry Richardson
March	Reese Witherspoon	Alexi Lubomirski
April	Nicole Kidman	Norman Jean Roy
May	Irina Nikolaeva	Arseny Jabiev
June	Jennifer Lawrence	Mario Sorrenti
July/August	Natalia Chabanenko	
September	Kanye West & Kim Kardashian	Karl Lagerfeld
October	Carly Moore	Benjamin Kanarek
November	Marlena Szoka	Marc Philbert
December	Gwyneth Paltrow	Alexi Lubomirski

=== 2017 ===
Issue	Cover model	Photographer
January	Keira Knightley	Alexi Lubomirski
February	Felicity Jones	David Slijper
March	Crista Cober	Yulia Gorbachenko
April	Madonna	Luigi & Iango
May	Nataliya Bulycheva	Arseny Jabiev
June	Amanda Wellsh	Yulia Gorbachenko
July/August	Dasha Khlystun	Stephan Lisowski
September	Courtney Love & Karlie Kloss	Brigitte Lacombe
October	Julia Ratner	Yulia Gorbachenko
November	Enikő Mihalik	Arseny Jabiev
December	Tina Karol	Yulia Gorbachenko

=== 2018 ===
Issue	Cover model	Photographer
January	Emilia Clarke	Mariano Vivanco
February	Carey Mulligan	Richard Phibbs
March	Helena Christensen	Yulia Gorbachenko
April	Hannah Ferguson	Yulia Gorbachenko
May	Jennifer Lopez	Mariano Vivanco
June	Alexa Chung	Agata Pospieszynska
July/August	Nataliya Gotsiy	Stephan Lisowski
September	Christina Aguilera	Mario Sorrenti
October	Jena Goldsack	Arseny Jabiev
November	Zoë Kravitz	Camilla Åkrans
December	Maryna Polkanova	Arseny Jabiev

=== 2019 ===
Issue	Cover model	Photographer
January	Kateryna Zub	Stephan Lisowski
February	Julia Roberts	Alexi Lubomirski
March	Emily Ratajkowski	Mario Sorrenti
April	Coco Rocha	Pelle Lannefors
May	Vanessa Paradis	Philip Gay
June	Antonina Petković	Nickolas Lorieux
July/August	Oliwia Lis	Pelle Lannefors
September	Celine Dion	Mario Sorrenti
October	Natalie Portman	Pamela Hanson
November	Sofía Fanego	Pelle Lannefors
December	Clare Crawford	Arseny Jabiev

== 2020s ==
=== 2020 ===
Issue	Cover model	Photographer
January	Angelina Jolie	Sølve Sundsbø
February	Kristen Stewart	Alexi Lubomirski
March	Karlie Kloss	Sebastian Faena
April	Gwyneth Paltrow	Zoey Grossman
May/June	Yumi Lambert	Pelle Lannefors
July/August	Alla Kostromichova	Ania Brudna
September	Rihanna	Gray Sorrenti
October	Lou Doillon	Adrian Crispin
November	Marion Cotillard	Serge Leblon
December	Margo Storozhenko	Stefan Lisovsky

=== 2021 ===
Issue	Cover model	Photographer
January/February	Vanessa Kirby	Scott Trindle
March	Julia Ratner	Yurko Kalichack
April	Sara Eirud	Julia Romanovskaya
July/August	Laura Jaraminaite	Julia Romanovskaya

=== 2024 ===
Issue	Cover model	Photographer
April (digital)	Maryna Polkanova	Baturalp Yilmaz
June (digital)	Amalia	Katya Teller

=== 2025 ===
Issue	Cover model	Photographer
June (digital)	Alla Bonya	Ivan Khodanych
September (digital)	Kate Moss	David Sims
September (digital)	Elvira Paterson	
October (digital)	Kseniya Mishyna	Alexandr Porubaymykh
November (digital)	Ramina Eshakzai	Alina Kvitka
December (digital)	Nastya Burlaka	

=== 2026 ===
Issue	Cover model	Photographer
January (digital)	Alina	Katya Teller
March (digital)	Anjelika Hanchuk	Katya Teller
March (digital)	Kola	Danil Kaistro
April (digital)	Olga Maiko	Nika Orlova
May (digital)	Anastasia Shukhnina	Catherine Nikolaichuk
June (digital)	Kateryna Kukhar and dancers of the National Opera of Ukraine	Ivan Khodanych
July (digital)	Alvetina Kakhidze, Nataliia Tkachenko	Ivan Khodanych
August (digital)	Anna Honcharova	Dmytro Honchavrov
September (digital)	Loli Bahia	Inez & Vinoodh

== See also ==
- List of Vogue Ukraine cover models
