= List of Harper's Bazaar Japan cover models =

This list of Harper's Bazaar Japan cover models (2000–2010; 2013–present) is a catalog of cover models who have appeared on the cover of Harper's Bazaar Japan, the Japanese edition of American fashion magazine Harper's Bazaar.

== 2000s ==
=== 2000 ===
Issue	Cover model	Photographer
October	Kirsty, Anya, Gosia Ogledcka, Ai Tominaga, Mayuko Asano	Keisuke Ogata
November		
December	Cameron Diaz	Craig McDean

=== 2001 ===
Issue	Cover model	Photographer
January		
February		
March	Meg Ryan	
April		
May		
June	Ljupka Gojić	
July		
August	Chloë Sevigny	Patrick Demarchelier
September		
October		
November		
December		

=== 2002 ===
Issue	Cover model	Photographer
January		
February	Liv Tyler	Patrick Demarchelier
March		
April		
May		
June		
July		
August	Gisele Bündchen	Patrick Demarchelier
September		
October	Ai Tominaga	
November	Drew Barrymore	Patrick Demarchelier
December		

=== 2003 ===
Issue	Cover model	Photographer
January		
February		
March		
April		
May		
June		
July		
August		
September		
October		
November		
December		

=== 2004 ===
Issue	Cover model	Photographer
January		
February		
March		
April		
May		
June		
July		
August	Naomi Watts	Sam Haskins
September		
October		
November		
December		

=== 2005 ===
Issue	Cover model	Photographer
January		
February		
March		
April		
May		
June		
July		
August		
September		
October		
November		
December		

=== 2006 ===
Issue	Cover model	Photographer
January		
February		
March		
April		
May		
June		
July		
August		
September		
October		
November		
December		

=== 2007 ===
Issue	Cover model	Photographer
January		
February		
March		
April		
May		
June		
July		
August		
September	Dita Von Teese	
October	Catherine Zeta-Jones	
November		
December		

=== 2008 ===
Issue	Cover model	Photographer
January		
February		
March		
April		
May		
June		
July		
August		
September		
October	Monika "Jac" Jagaciak	
November		
December		

=== 2009 ===
Issue	Cover model	Photographer
January		
February		
March	Angelina Jolie	Max Vadukul
April		
May		
June		
July		
August		
September		
October	Dorith Mous	Takaki Kumada
November		
December		

== 2010s ==
=== 2010 ===
Issue	Cover model	Photographer
January	Lily Cole	Guy Aroch
February		
March	Anja Rubik	
April		
May	Cate Blanchett	
June	Cynthia Nixon, Sarah Jessica Parker, Kristin Davis, Kim Cattrall	
July	Kate Moss	Peter Lindbergh
August	Gwyneth Paltrow	
September	Cameron Diaz, Tom Cruise	
October	Valentina Zelyaeva	Takaki Kumada
November	Jennifer Aniston	
December	Gisele Bündchen	Cédric Buchet

=== 2013 ===
Issue	Cover model	Photographer
September/October	Sarah Jessica Parker	Terry Richardson

=== 2014 ===
Issue	Cover model	Photographer
March/April	Madonna	Terry Richardson
May/June	Lady Gaga	Terry Richardson
July/August	Kate Moss	Terry Richardson
September/October	Michelle Williams	Peter Lindbergh
November/December	Lady Gaga	Sebastian Faena

=== 2015 ===
Issue	Cover model	Photographer
January/February	Anne Hathaway	Alexi Lubomirski
March	Reese Witherspoon	Alexi Lubomirski
April	Miranda Kerr	Terry Richardson
May	Gwyneth Paltrow	Alexi Lubomirski
June	Kitty Hayes	Anthony Maule
July/August	Arizona Muse	Kacper Kasprzyk
September	Caroline de Maigret	Tajima Kazunali
September	Anabel Krasnotsvetova	
October	Katy Perry	Jean-Paul Goude
November	Ola Rudnicka	Yusuke Miyazaki
December	Rosie Huntington-Whiteley	Alexi Lubomirski

=== 2016 ===
Issue	Cover model	Photographer
January/February	Gabriella Wilde	Felix Cooper
March	Ginta Lapiņa	David Slijper
April	Reese Witherspoon	Alexi Lubomirski
May	Arizona Muse	Michelangelo Di Battista
June	Daria Werbowy	Nico Bustos
July/August	Guinevere Van Seenus	Sofia Sanchez & Mauro Mongiello
September	Sam Rollinson	Michelangelo Di Battista
October	Lara Stone	Karl Lagerfeld
November	Inga Dezhina	Yusuke Miyazaki
December	Bella Hadid	Mathieu Cesar

=== 2017 ===
Issue	Cover model	Photographer
January/February	Nadinne Rios	Yusuke Miyazaki
March	Veronika Rusakova	Yusuke Miyazaki
April	Christy Turlington	Norman Jean Roy
May	Greta Varlese	Michelangelo Di Battista
June	Flo Dron	Yusuke Miyazaki
July/August	Paris Jackson	Jean-Paul Goude
September	Julie Hoomans	Daniel King
October	Candice Swanepoel, The Weeknd, Joan Smalls	Brigitte Lacombe
November	Anna Cleveland	Michelangelo Di Battista
December	Ionela Guraliuc	Yusuke Miyazaki

=== 2018 ===
Issue	Cover model	Photographer
January/February	Angelina Jolie	Alexi Lubomirski
March	Carolyn Murphy	Nino Muñoz
April	Lina Hoss	Michelangelo Di Battista
April	Linda Evangelista	Patrick Demarchelier
May	Michelle Williams	Agata Pospieszynska
June	Kendall Jenner	Sølve Sundsbø
July/August	Elle Fanning	Sofia Sanchez & Mauro Mongiello
September	Bella Hadid	Sølve Sundsbø
October	Theodora Richards, Alexandra Richards	Mario Sorrenti
November	Vanessa Moody	Michelangelo Di Battista
December	Zoë Kravitz	Camilla Åkrans

=== 2019 ===
Issue	Cover model	Photographer
January/February	Gisele Bündchen	Nino Muñoz
March	Sarah Brannon	Masami Naruo
April	Emily Ratajkowski	Mario Sorrenti
May	Saoirse Ronan	Erik Madigan Heck
June	Daiane Conterato	Masami Naruo
July/August	Fanni Csajagi	Yasutomo Ebisu
September	Niko Matičević	Masayuki Ichinose
October	Alicia Keys	Mario Sorrenti
November	Kristen Stewart	Alexi Lubomirski
December	Marysia Marecka	Yusuke Miyazaki

== 2020s ==
=== 2020 ===
Issue	Cover model	Photographer
January/February	Ruth Bouwmeester	Yusuke Miyazaki
March	Mads Vogelsang	Masami Naruo
April	Gwyneth Paltrow	Zoey Grossman
May	Carmen Kass	Xavi Gordo
June	Gugu Mbatha-Raw	Richard Phibbs
July/August	Léa Seydoux	Alexi Lubomirski
September	Christy Turlington	Mario Sorrenti
October	Rihanna	Gray Sorrenti
November	Naomi Osaka	David Slijper
December	Julia Fajardo	Masami Naruo

=== 2021 ===
Issue	Cover model	Photographer
January/February	Liya Kebede	Christopher Anderson
January/February	Baekhyun	Mok Jungwook
March	Ryoko Yonekura	Mitsuo Okamoto
March	Vanessa Kirby	Scott Trindle
March	Delfina	Yoshiyuki Nagamoto
April	Awkwafina	Ryan McGinley
April	Mia B	Sarai Mari
May	Takanori Iwata	Yasutomo Ebisu
May	Lena Cat	Yasutomo Ebisu
May	Carey Mulligan	Quentin Jones
June	Chiara Ferragni	Jacopo Noera
June	Megan Thee Stallion	Collier Schorr
July/August	Jennie	Kim Heejune
July/August	Rhyme	Yusuke Miyazaki
September	Marisa Shea	Yusuke Miyazaki
September	Tomohisa Yamashita	
September	Megan Rapinoe	Ryan McGinley
October	Beyoncé	Campbell Addy
November	Elena Z	Kenya Sugai
December	Ruby Tuesday	Takeshi Takagi
December	Natalia Vodianova	Cedric Bihr

=== 2022 ===
Issue	Cover model	Photographer
January/February	Marika	Yusuke Miyazaki
March	Taira	Yusuke Miyazaki
March	Cha Eun-Woo	
April	Nana Komatsu	
May	Jisoo	Kim Hee June
June	Nana Eikura, Kento Kaku	
July/August	Hikari Mitsushima	
July/August	Carolyn Murphy	
July/August	Shuzo Ohira	
September	Sakura Miyawaki	
September	Anne Hathaway	
October	Tomorrow x Together	
October	Mika Schneider	
November	Rie Miyazawa	Akinori Ito
December	Juri Ueno	Yusuke Miyazaki
December	Ryota Katayose	Saki Omi

=== 2023 ===
Issue	Cover model	Photographer
January/February	Erika Toda	Teruo Horikoshi
January/February	Awich	Fumi Nagasaka
January/February	Kentaro Sakaguchi	Kodai Ikemitsu
March	Ko Shibasaki	Akinori Ito
April	Snow Man	
May	Kaela Kimura	Masami Naruo
June	Haruka Ayase	Akinori Ito
July/August	Mei Nagano	Tak Sugita
September	Rinko Kikuchi	Mitsuo Okamoto
September	Stray Kids	Kim Yeong Jun
October	Kendall Jenner	Mario Sorrenti
November	Nana Komatsu	Leslie Zhang
December	Rikako Yagi	Keiichiro Nakajima

=== 2024 ===
Issue	Cover model	Photographer
January/February	Awich	Yoshiyuki Nagatomo
March	Yuko Araki	Serge Leblon
April	Felix	Ahn Jooyoung
May	Fumi Nikaido	Kodai Ikemitsu
June	Mina	Seiji Fujimori
July/August	Hana Sugisaki	Hiroko Matsubara
September	Hikari Mori	Akinori Ito
September	Jeonghan	Yoshiyuki Nagatomo
October	Yuta Jinguji	Teruo Horikoshi
October	Mel Van Roemburg	Hiroko Matsubara
November	Hikari Mitsushima	Teruo Horikoshi
December	Ren Meguro	Giulio Rustichelli

=== 2025 ===
Issue	Cover model	Photographer
January/February	Tzuyu	Ahn Jooyoung
March	Suzu Hirose	Masami Naruo
April	Enhypen	Young Bae
May	Mina	Sang-Hun Lee
June	Masami Nagasawa	Ayaka Endo
June	Wonwoo	
July/August	Yuumi Kawai	Hiroko Matsubara
September	Sakura Miyawaki, Kazuha	Yoshiyuki Nagamoto
October	Karina	Go Wontae
November	Chanmina	Teruo Horikoshi
December	Suzy	Kim Hee June

=== 2026 ===
Issue	Cover model	Photographer
January/February	Momo	Ahn Jooyoung
January/February	Yuzuru Hanyu	Yuki Kumagai
March	Akari Takaishi	Sio Yoshida
April	Eri Fukatsu	Mitsuo Okamoto
May	Sakura Ando	Katsuhide Morimoto
June	Mrs. Green Apple	Kodai Ikemitsu
July/August	Momoka	Teruo Horikoshi
September	Yuri	Yuto Kudo
September	Jung Kook	Yoon Jiyong
October	Tao Okamoto	Katsuhide Morimoto

== See also ==
- List of L'Officiel Japan cover models
- List of Vogue Japan cover models
