= List of Numéro Tokyo cover models =

This list of Numéro Tokyo cover models is a catalog of cover models who have appeared on the cover of the Japanese edition of Numéro magazine, starting with the magazine's first issue in April 2007.

== 2007 ==
Issue	Cover model	Photographer
#1. April	Kate Moss	Sølve Sundsbø
#2. May	Coco Rocha	Sølve Sundsbø
#3. June	Kim Noorda	Greg Kadel
#4. July	Caroline Trentini	Greg Kadel
#5. August	Daria Werbowy	Dusan Reljin
#6. September	Shannan Click	Liz Collins
#7. October	Anja Rubik	Philippe Cometti
#8. November	Bette Franke	Dusan Reljin
#9. December	Chloë Sevigny	Dusan Reljin

== 2008 ==
Issue	Cover model	Photographer
#10. January	Missy Rayder	Maciek Kobielski
#11. February	Rinko Kikuchi	Bettina Pheims
#12. March	Doutzen Kroes	Alex Cayley
#13. April	Natalia Vodianova	Vincent Peters
#14. May	Mariacarla Boscono	David Vasiljevic
#15. June	Snejana Onopka	David Vasiljevic
#16. July	Raquel Zimmermann	Alex Cayley
#17. August	Tanya Dziahileva	Greg Kadel
#18. September	Anna Jagodzińska	David Vasiljevic
#19. October	Coco Rocha	Alix Malka
#20. November	Julia Stegner	Alex Cayley
#21. December	Micky Green	

== 2009 ==
Issue	Cover model	Photographer
#22. January	Stella Tennant	Alex Cayley
#23. February	Agyness Deyn	Alex Cayley
#24. March	Jessica Stam	David Vasiljevic
#25. April	Claudia Schiffer	Liz Collins
#26. May	Isabeli Fontana	Alex Cayley
#27. June	Gisele Bündchen	Nino Muñoz
#28. July/August	Vlada Roslyakova	David Vasiljevic
#29. September	Eva Herzigová	Alex Cayley
#30. October	Ali Stephens	David Vasiljevic
#31. November	Toni Garrn	David Vasiljevic
#32. December	Devon Aoki	Sebastian Kim

== 2010 ==
Issue	Cover model	Photographer
#33. January/February	Caroline Trentini	David Vasiljevic
#34. March	Maryna Linchuk	David Vasiljevic
#35. April	Natasha Poly	Alex Cayley
#36. May	Doutzen Kroes	Alexi Lubomirski
#37. June	Karmen Pedaru	David Vasiljevic
#38. July/August	Edita Vilkevičiūtė	Sebastian Kim
#39. September	Kasia Struss	David Vasiljevic
#40. October	Constance Jablonski	Alex Cayley
#41. November	Raquel Zimmermann	Motohiko Hasui
#42. December	Karolína Kurková	Alex Cayley

== 2011 ==
Issue	Cover model	Photographer
#43. January/February	Katja Borghuis; Marc Jacobs; Kristy Kaurova	Brian Bowen Smith
#44. March	Anna Selezneva	David Vasiljevic
#45. April	Sigrid Agren	Alex Cayley
#46. May	Gisele Bündchen	Nino Muñoz
#47. June	Aline Weber	Sebastian Kim
#48. July/August	Angela Lindvall	Matthias Vriens-McGrath
#49. September	Guinevere Van Seenus	Alex Cayley
#50. October	Jessica Stam	Alexi Lubomirski
#51. November	Monika Jagaciak	Nino Muñoz
#52. December	Kendra Spears	Nino Muñoz

== 2012 ==
Issue	Cover model	Photographer
#53. January/February	Hilary Rhoda	Alexi Lubomirski
#54. March	Victoria Beckham	Horst Diekgerdes
#55. April	Lily Donaldson	Nino Muñoz
#56. May	Lindsey Wixson	Éric Guillemain
#57. June	Miranda Kerr	Nino Muñoz
#58. July/August	Georgia May Jagger	Horst Diekgerdes
#59. September	Candice Swanepoel	Alexi Lubomirski
#60. October	Alexa Chung	Angelo Pennetta
#61. November	Ginta Lapiņa	Nino Muñoz
#62. December	Toni Garrn	Nino Muñoz

== 2013 ==
Issue	Cover model	Photographer
#63. January/February	Hilary Rhoda	Vincent Peters
#64. March	Lana Del Rey	Mariano Vivanco
#65. April	Carolyn Murphy	Nino Muñoz
#66. May	Małgosia Bela	Éric Guillemain
#67. June	Karolína Kurková	Nino Muñoz
#68. July/August	Sky Ferreira	Sofia Sanchez & Mauro Mongiello
#69. September	Rosie Huntington-Whiteley	Alexi Lubomirski
#70. October	Magdalena Frackowiak	Sofia Sanchez & Mauro Mongiello
#71. November	Anna Selezneva	Guy Aroch
#72. December	Adriana Lima	Vincent Peters

== 2014 ==
Issue	Cover model	Photographer
#73. January/February	Cara Delevingne	Sofia Sanchez & Mauro Mongiello
#74. March	Valerija Kelava	Sofia Sanchez & Mauro Mongiello
#75. April	Vlada Roslyakova	Ellen von Unwerth
#76. May	Kiko Mizuhara	Miko Lim
#77. June	Meghan Collison	Sofia Sanchez & Mauro Mongiello
#78. July/August	Julia Frauche	Miles Aldridge
#79. September	Elizabeth Olsen	Michael Schwartz
#80. October	Lindsey Wixson	Guy Aroch
#81. November	Maggie Rizer	Alexi Lubomirski
#82. December	Tao Okamoto	Benny Horne

== 2015 ==
Issue	Cover model	Photographer
#83. January/February	Esmeralda Seay-Reynolds	Sofia Sanchez & Mauro Mongiello
#84. March	Anna Grostina; Steffy Argelich; Maria Veranen	Sofia Sanchez & Mauro Mongiello
#85. April	Valery Kaufman	Karen Collins
#86. May	Kristine Froseth	Karen Collins
#87. June	Lindsey Wixson	Karen Collins
#88. July/August	Harleth Kuusik	Karen Collins
#89. September	Hollie-May Saker	Sofia Sanchez & Mauro Mongiello
#90. October	Enikő Mihalik	Joan Braun
#91. November	Maggie Jablonski	Elena Rendina
#92. December	Ella Richards	Mari Sarai

== 2016 ==
Issue	Cover model	Photographer
#93. January/February	Yumi Lambert	Elena Rendina
#94. March	Agnes Nieske Abma	Sofia Sanchez & Mauro Mongiello
#95. April	Ola Rudnicka	Ellen von Unwerth
#96. May	Guinevere Van Seenus	Sofia Sanchez & Mauro Mongiello
#97. June	Kiko Mizuhara	Sofia Sanchez & Mauro Mongiello
#98. July/August	Chiara Ferragni; Nicky Hilton	Elena Rendina
#99. September	Lily Nova & Willy Morsch	Sofia Sanchez & Mauro Mongiello
#100. October	Rola	Elena Rendina
#101. November	Peyton Knight	Sofia Sanchez & Mauro Mongiello
#102. December	Frida Gustavsson	Ellen von Unwerth

== 2017 ==
Issue	Cover model	Photographer
#103. January/February	Sarah Brannon	Guy Aroch
#104. March	Frida Aasen	Ellen von Unwerth
#105. April	Karen Elson	Alex Cayley
#106. May	Stef van der Laan & Ferdi Sibbel	Ellen von Unwerth
#107. June	Molly Bair	Tim Barber
#108. July/August	Petra Collins	Frederic Auerbach
#109. September	Mackenzie Foy	Petra Collins
#110. October	Jena Goldsack	Ellen von Unwerth
#111. November	Daphne Groeneveld	Guy Aroch
#112. December	Willow Hand	Karen Collins

== 2018 ==
Issue	Cover model	Photographer
#113. January/February	Devon Windsor	Ellen von Unwerth
#114. March	Hailey Clauson	Ellen von Unwerth
#115. April	Josephine Skriver	Zoey Grossman
#116. May	Missy Rayder	Peter Ash Lee
#117. June	Petra Collins	Moni Haworth
#118. July/August	Taylor Hill	Zoey Grossman
#119. September	Namie Amuro	Elena Rendina
#120. October	Rola	Zoey Grossman
#121. November	Stella Maxwell	Zoey Grossman
#122. December	Marjan Jonkman	Zoey Grossman

== 2019 ==
Issue	Cover model	Photographer
#123. January/February	Candice Swanepoel	Zoey Grossman
#124. March	Gemma Ward	Zoey Grossman
#125. April	Georgia May Jagger	Zoey Grossman
