= List of Harper's Bazaar Srbija cover models =

This article is a catalog of actresses and models who have appeared on the cover of Harper's Bazaar Srbija, the Serbian edition of Harper's Bazaar magazine, starting with the magazine's first issue in October 2014.

== 2010s ==
=== 2014 ===
Issue	Cover model	Photographer
October	Claudia Schiffer	Sebastian Faena
November	Katy Perry	Camilla Åkrans
December	Anne Hathaway	Alexi Lubomirski

=== 2015 ===
Issue	Cover model	Photographer
January	Coco Rocha	Natth Jaturapahu
February	Nimue Smit	Mikael Schulz
March	Rosie Huntington-Whiteley	Anthony Maule
April	Gwyneth Paltrow	Alexi Lubomirski
May	Ana Ivanovic	John Russo
June	Marina Krtinić	Nikola Tamindzic
July	Emilia Clarke	Norman Jean Roy
August	Antonina Petković	Angelo D'Agostino
September	Katy Perry	Jean-Paul Goude
October	Marine Deleeuw	Angelo D'Agostino
November	Georgina Stojiljković	Miloš Nadaždin
December	Mina Cvetković	Angelo D'Agostino

=== 2016 ===
Issue	Cover model	Photographer
January	Luma Grothe	Yossi Michaeli
February	Zhenya Katava	Yossi Michaeli
March	Kasia Struss	Erik Madigan Heck
April	Kristine Froseth	Angelo D'Agostino
May	Crystal Renn	Choi Yong Bin
June	Chanel Iman	Joshua Jordan
July	Nimue Smit	Mikael Schulz
August	Maja Marić	Miloš Nadaždin
September	Kanye West, Kim Kardashian	Karl Lagerfeld
October	Ruby Aldridge	Olivia Malone
November	Amra Čerkezović, Jovana Vujačić	Miloš Nadaždin
December	Dajana Antic	Luis Monteiro

=== 2017 ===
Issue	Cover model	Photographer
January	Maria Kudryavtseva	Arseny Jabiev
February	Hedvig Palm	Louis Christopher
March	Madonna	Luigi & Iango
April	Ophélie Guillermand	Andrew Yee
May	Lindsey Wixson	Erik Madigan Heck
June	Hilary Rhoda	Zoey Grossman
July	Andreja Pejić	Dusan Reljin
August	Bojana Krsmanović	Miloš Nadaždin
September	Adriana Lima; The Weeknd; Irina Shayk	Brigitte Lacombe
October	Alexina Graham	Andrea Klarin
November	Marina Krtinić	Miloš Nadaždin
December	Tamara Lazić	Marko Vulević

=== 2018 ===
Issue	Cover model	Photographer
January	Georgina Stojiljković	Miloš Nadaždin
February	Tatiana Korsakova	Natali Arefieva
March	Sam Rollinson	Luis Monteiro
April	Nataša Vojnović	Miloš Nadaždin
May	Karmen Pedaru	Andrew Yee
June	Winnie Harlow	Yu Tsai
July	Dan Kic	Marko Vulević
August	Mila Miletic	Filip Koludrović
September	Christina Aguilera	Mario Sorrenti
October	Ola Rudnicka	Greg Swales
November	Jelena Karleuša	Marko Vulević
December	Nimue Smit	Igor Cvoro

=== 2019 ===
Issue	Cover model	Photographer
January	Maya Henry	Daniella Midenge
February	Margot Robbie	Camilla Åkrans
March	Valery Kaufman	Andrea Klarin
April	Jessica Stam	Greg Swales
May	Camila Coelho	Andrea Klarin
June	Nataliya Sveshnikova	Andrew Ivaskiv
July	Olivia Arben	Luis Monteiro
August	Georgina Stojiljković	Marko Vulević
September	Christy Turlington	Mario Sorrenti
October	Madison Headrick	Greg Swales
November	Mila Miletic, Vučina Džankić	Marko Vulević
December	Sofia Symonds	Luis Monteiro

== 2020s ==
=== 2020 ===
Issue	Cover model	Photographer
January	Bojana Stankovic	
January	Natalia Barulich	
February	Kaki West Swid	Dimitry Loiseau
March	Marija Zeželj	Miloš Nadaždin
March	Tiana Tolstoi	Andrea Klarin
April	Kate Kisto Korobova	Daniella Midenge
May	Isabeli Fontana	Eduardo Rezende
June	Sabina Jakubowicz	Gosia Turczynska
July	Dan Kic	Audshule
August	Joanna Krneta	Vladimir Ilić
September	Rihanna	Gray Sorrenti
October	Irina Djuranovic	Marko Vulevic
November	Stephania Stegman	Sergio Valenzuela
December	Daniela Botero	Jorge Duva

=== 2021 ===
Issue	Cover model	Photographer
January	Melania Dalla Costa	Luis Monteiro
February	Afiya Bennett	Ace Amir
March		Marko Vulevic
April	Tatiana Usatii	
May		
June	Alexina Graham	Luis Monteiro
July		
August	Bianca Rojas	Sam Spence
September	Zarina Yeva	
October	Ophélie Guillermand	JuanKr
October	Lana Setunova	Jean Baptiste Fort
October		Marko Vulevic
November		
December	Katarina Filipović Asik	Marko Vulevic

=== 2022 ===
Issue	Cover model	Photographer
January	Ekaterina Smirnova	Xavi Gordo
February		
March	Amra Cerkezovic	Marko Vulevic
April	Sofia Resing	Nicholas Tamposi
April	Eleonora Bernardi Zizola	
May		
June		
July	Mili Boskovic	Marko Vulevic
August	Skaiste Calkaite	
September	Svetlana Savitskaia	Jean Baptiste Fort
October	Lydia Bielen	Alberto Gonzalez
November		
December	Ann-Sophie Thieme	Yongqi Liu

=== 2023 ===
Issue	Cover model	Photographer
January		
February		
March		
April		
May		Marko Vulevic
June		
July		
August		
September		
October		
November		
December		

=== 2024 ===
Issue	Cover model	Photographer
January		
February		
March		
April		
May		
June		
July		
August		
September		
October		
November		
December		

=== 2025 ===
Issue	Cover model	Photographer
January		
February		
March		
April		
May		
June		
July		
August		
September	Coco Rocha	Tom Marvel
September	Tyra Banks	Dalvin Adams
September	Kate Moss	David Sims
