= List of Elle Canada cover models =

This list of Elle Canada cover models (2001–present) is a catalog of cover models who have appeared on the cover of Elle Canada, the Canadian edition of French lifestyle magazine Elle.

== 1980s ==
=== 1989 ===
Issue	Cover model	Photographer
January		
February		
March		
April		
May		
June		
July		
August		
September	Linda Evangelista	
October	Andrea Battersby	
November		
December	Elaine Irwin	

== 1990s ==
=== 1990 ===
Issue	Cover model	Photographer
January	Claire Dhelens	
February	Estelle Lefebure	
March	Alexandra Aubin	
April	Estelle Lefebure	
May	Yasmeen Ghauri	
June	Niki Taylor	
July	Danelle Scott	
August	Claudia Schiffer	
September	Linda Evangelista	
October	Elaine Irwin	
November	Audrey Benoit	
December	Zofia Borucka	

=== 1991 ===
Issue	Cover model	Photographer
January	Gretha Cavazzoni	
February	Audrey Benoit	
March		
April		
May	Gretha Cavazzoni	
June	Yasmeen Ghauri	
July	Estelle Lefebure	
August	Ebba Elmer	
September	Helena Christensen	
October	Emma Sjoberg	
November	Claudia Schiffer	
December	Elaine Irwin	

=== 1992 ===
Issue	Cover model	Photographer
January	Catherine McCord	
February	Rebecca Romijn	
March		
April	Toneya Bird	
May	Claudia Schiffer	
June	Cindy Crawford	
July	Niki Taylor	
August		
September		
October	Niki Taylor	
November		
December		

=== 1993 ===
Issue	Cover model	Photographer
January	Claudia Schiffer	
February		
March		
April	Gabrielle Reece	
May		
June	Gabrielle Reece	
July		
August	Amber Valletta	
September	Manon von Gerkan	
October	Anna Koch	
November		
December		

=== 1994 ===
Issue	Cover model	Photographer
January	Elaine Irwin	
February	Eve Salvail	
March	Carmen Schwarz	
April		
May	Lynsey Parker	
June		
July	Claudia Schiffer	
August	Kim Renneberg	
September	Georgina Grenville	
October		
November	Claudia Schiffer	
December		

=== 1995 ===
Issue	Cover model	Photographer
January		
February		
March		
April	Carolyn Murphy	
May	Estelle Lefebure	
June		
July		
August		
September		
October	Tricia Helfer	
November	Gina Marie DiPietro-DeGiovanni	
December	Eva Herzigova	

=== 1996 ===
Issue	Cover model	Photographer
January		
February		
March	Linda Evangelista	
April		
May	Nadja Auermann	
June	Heather Stewart-Whyte	
July	Viola Haqi	
August	Laetitia Casta	
September		
October		
November		
December		

=== 1997 ===
Issue	Cover model	Photographer
January	Anneliese Seubert	
February	Valeria Mazza	
March	Karen Ferrari	
April		
May		
June	Rosie Edeh and Micha Powell	
July		
August		
September		
October		
November		
December		

=== 1998 ===
Issue	Cover model	Photographer
January	Zofia Borucka	
February		
March	Laetitia Casta	
April	Magali Amadei	
May	Cindy Crawford	
June	Shiraz Tal	
July	Helena Dahlquist	
August	Helena Dahlquist	
September		
October		
November		
December		

=== 1999 ===
Issue	Cover model	Photographer
January	Marie-Eve Nadeau	
February		
March		
April		
May	Laetitia Casta	
June	Eva Herzigova	
July		
August	Lonneke Engel	
September		
October		
November		
December		

== 2010s ==
=== 2010 ===
Issue	Cover model	Photographer
January	Lily Cole	Rankin
February	Charlize Theron	Alexi Lubomirski
March	Liane Balaban	Vincent Lions
April	Scarlett Johansson	Tom Munro
May	Elettra Rossellini	Nelson Simoneau
June	Jessiann Gravel	Leda & St-Jacques
July	Kori Richardson	John van der Schilden
August	Katy Perry	Rankin
September	Daria Werbowy	Raphael Mazzucco
October	Hilary Rhoda	Leda & St-Jacques
November	Evan Rachel Wood	James White
December	Laura Rowley	Richard Dubois

=== 2011 ===
Issue	Cover model	Photographer
January	Natalie Portman	Peggy Sirota
February	Dianna Agron	Paola Kudacki
March	Emily Blunt	Matthias Vriens-McGrath
April	Amanda Laine	
May	Coco Rocha	Nelson Simoneau
June	Sarah Jordan	Leda & St-Jacques
July	Herieth Paul	Richard Bernardin
August	Malin Åkerman	Bleacher + Everard
September	Jessica Chastain	Giuliano Bekor
October	Leslie Feist	Mary Rozzi
November	Emma Watson	Tom Munro
December	Alana Zimmer	Leda & St-Jacques

=== 2012 ===
Issue	Cover model	Photographer
January	Kate Beckinsale	Bleacher + Everard
February	Kate King	Leda & St-Jacques
March	Amanda Seyfried	Matthias Vriens-McGrath
April	Alison Brie	Giuliano Bekor
May	Cobie Smulders	Giuliano Bekor
June	Tara Gill	Tess Feuilhade
July	Carrie Underwood	John van der Schilden
August	Heather Marks & Meghan Collison	Jean-Claude Lussier
September	Gwyneth Paltrow	Chris Floyd
October	Sarah Gadon	John van der Schilden
November	Pink	Andrew MacPherson
December	Taylor Swift	Andrew MacPherson

=== 2013 ===
Issue	Cover model	Photographer
January	Jennifer Lopez	Matthias Vriens-McGrath
February	Janelle Monáe	John van der Schilden
March	Jessica Paré	John van der Schilden
April	Victoria Beckham	Carter Smith
May	Grace Mahary	Leda & St-Jacques
June	Rebecca Hall	Max Abadian
July	Shay Mitchell	Colette De Barros
August	Dauphine McKee	John van der Schilden
September	Lily Collins	Max Abadian
October	Katy Perry	Mariano Vivanco
November	Scarlett Johansson	Rankin
December	Jennifer Lawrence	Emma Summerton

=== 2014 ===
Issue	Cover model	Photographer
January	Cate Blanchett	Jan Welters
February	Kate Mara	Max Abadian
March	Logan Patterson	Arkan Zakharov
April	Emily VanCamp	Colette De Barros
May	Rose Byrne	Colette De Barros
June	Emma Roberts	Max Abadian
July	Gisele Bündchen	Matt Jones
August	Pamela Bernier; Kayla Clarke; Sophie Touchet	Arkan Zakharov
September	Mia Wasikowska	Max Abadian
October	Drew Barrymore	Daniel Jackson
November	Lizzy Caplan	Colette De Barros
December	Hilary Duff	Max Abadian

=== 2015 ===
Issue	Cover model	Photographer
January	Alana Zimmer	Max Abadian
February	Katie Holmes	
March	Kate Bosworth	Max Abadian
April	Phoebe Tonkin	Beau Grealy
May	Bella Thorne	Max Abadian
June	Taylor Schilling	Max Abadian
July	Anais Pouliot	Leda & St-Jacques
August	Carly Rae Jepsen	Owen Bruce
September	Diane Kruger	Max Abadian
October	Cindy Crawford	Max Abadian
November	Gigi Hadid	Max Abadian
December	Kylie Jenner	Max Abadian

=== 2016 ===
Issue	Cover model	Photographer
January	Kate Bock	Max Abadian
February	Rita Ora	Max Abadian
March	Ebony Oshunrinde; Lilly Singh; Maria Qamar	Chris Nicholls
April	Iggy Azalea	Max Abadian
May	Beyoncé	Paola Kudacki
June	Elizabeth Olsen	Michael Schwartz
July	Amanda Seyfried	Riccardo Tinelli
August	Charlize Theron	Gilles Bensimon
September	Demi Lovato	Max Abadian
October	Ashley Graham	Max Abadian
November	Dakota Fanning	Max Abadian
December	Miranda Kerr	Max Abadian

=== 2017 ===
Issue	Cover model	Photographer
January	Crista Cober	Max Abadian
February	Winnie Harlow	Nelson Simoneau
March	Gwyneth Paltrow	Xavi Gordo
April	Emma Watson	Kerry Hallihan
May	Evan Rachel Wood	Max Abadian
June	Jessica Alba	Mike Rosenthal
July/August	Michaela Kocianova	Max Abadian
September	Jessica Chastain	Max Abadian
October	Rihanna	Sølve Sundsbø
November	Julia Roberts	Tom Munro
December	Tessa Thompson	Nino Muñoz

=== 2018 ===
Issue	Cover model	Photographer
January	Natalie Portman	David Bellemere
February	Daisy Ridley	Liz Collins
March	Gabrielle Union	Nino Muñoz
April	Keira Knightley	Liz Collins
May	Priyanka Chopra	Nino Muñoz
June	Jasmine Tookes	Tom Schirmacher
July/August	Charlize Theron	Mario Sorrenti
September	Tracee Ellis Ross	Nino Muñoz
October	Jennifer Lawrence	Mark Seliger
November	Isabeli Fontana	Terry Tsiolis
December/January	Cate Blanchett	Steven Chee

=== 2019 ===
Issue	Cover model	Photographer
February	Mandy Moore	Kai Z. Feng
March	Chrissy Teigen	Gilles Bensimon
April	Lana Condor	Max Abadian
May	Michelle Williams	Mariana Maltoni
June	Arlenis Sosa	Max Abadian
July/August	Celine Dion	Tom Munro
September	Winnie Harlow & Stephan James	Norman Wong
October	Priyanka Chopra	Marcin Kempski
November	Cara Delevingne	Liz Collins
December	Kate Bosworth	Nino Muñoz

== 2020s ==
=== 2020 ===
Issue	Cover model	Photographer
January	Beyoncé	Melina Matsoukas
February	Julia Roberts	Tom Munro
March	Jane Fonda	Max Abadian
April		
May		
June	Sandra Oh	Greg Swales
July/August	Dua Lipa	Zoey Grossman
September	Jessie Reyez	Leeor Wild
October	Adwoa Aboah	Liz Johnson Artur
November	Florence Pugh	Liz Collins
December/January	Letitia Wright	Marcin Kempski
