= List of Harper's Bazaar Chile cover models =

This list of Harper's Bazaar Chile cover models (2015–2019) is a catalog of cover models who have appeared on the cover of Harper's Bazaar Chile, the Chilean edition of American fashion magazine Harper's Bazaar.

== 2010s ==
=== 2015 ===
Issue	Cover model	Photographer
April	Emmy Rappe	Michael Avedon
May	Josefina Montané	Michael Avedon
June	Alexa Chung	Mark Abrahams
July	Claudia Schiffer	Nico Bustos
August	Sofía Stitchkin	Simón Pais
September	Katy Perry	Jean-Paul Goude
October	Trinidad de la Noi	Pedro Quintana
November	Lupita Nyong'o	Alexi Lubomirski
December	Francisca Benedetti	Pedro Quintana

=== 2016 ===
Issue	Cover model	Photographer
January/February	Lily Cameron	Pedro Quintana
March	Carmen Kass	Giovanni Gastel
April	Jessica Beckenkamp	Simón Pais
May	Mariana Coldebella	Pedro Quintana
June	Inès de La Fressange	Gonzalo Machado
July	Helena Christensen	Angelo D'Agostino
August	Isabeli Fontana	Thomas Whiteside
September	Natasha Poly	Karl Lagerfeld
October	Mariana Coldebella	Pedro Quintana
November	Alma Jodorowsky	Pedro Quintana
December	Zosia Nowak	Pedro Quintana

=== 2017 ===
Issue	Cover model	Photographer
January/February	Thais Custodio	Pedro Quintana
March	Carolyn Murphy	Bibi Cornejo Borthwick
April	Diana Balaisyte	Pepo Fernández
May	Gabriela Fuentes	Pedro Quintana
June	Kendall Jenner	Camilla Åkrans
July	Hazel Graye	Paola Velásquez
August	Alexa Chung	Tomás Reid
September	Courtney Love & Karlie Kloss	Brigitte Lacombe
October	Jasmine Sanders	Carlos Ruiz C
November	Angelina Jolie	Alexi Lubomirski
December	Peyton Knight	Pedro Quintana

=== 2018 ===
Issue	Cover model	Photographer
January/February	Anne Vyalitsyna	Pedro Quintana
March	Leonor Varela	Pedro Quintana
April	Kyla Moran	Simón Pais
May	Rosa Parsons; Lorenza Izzo; Carolina Parsons; Clara Lyon	Javiera Eyzaguirre
June	Jessica Hart	Pedro Quintana
July	Jóna Guðmundsdóttir & Sasha Pankratova	Simón Pais
August	Ava Smith	Pedro Quintana
September	Paris Jackson	Mario Sorrenti
October	Taylor Swift	Alexi Lubomirski
November	Dais Huisman	Pedro Quintana
December	Soekie Gravenhorst	Pedro Quintana

=== 2019 ===
Issue	Cover model	Photographer
January/February	Winnie Harlow	Jacques Burga
March	Daniela Vega (never published)	Pedro Quintana
