= Nicole Fleetwood =

American academic, curator, and author

Nicole R. Fleetwood
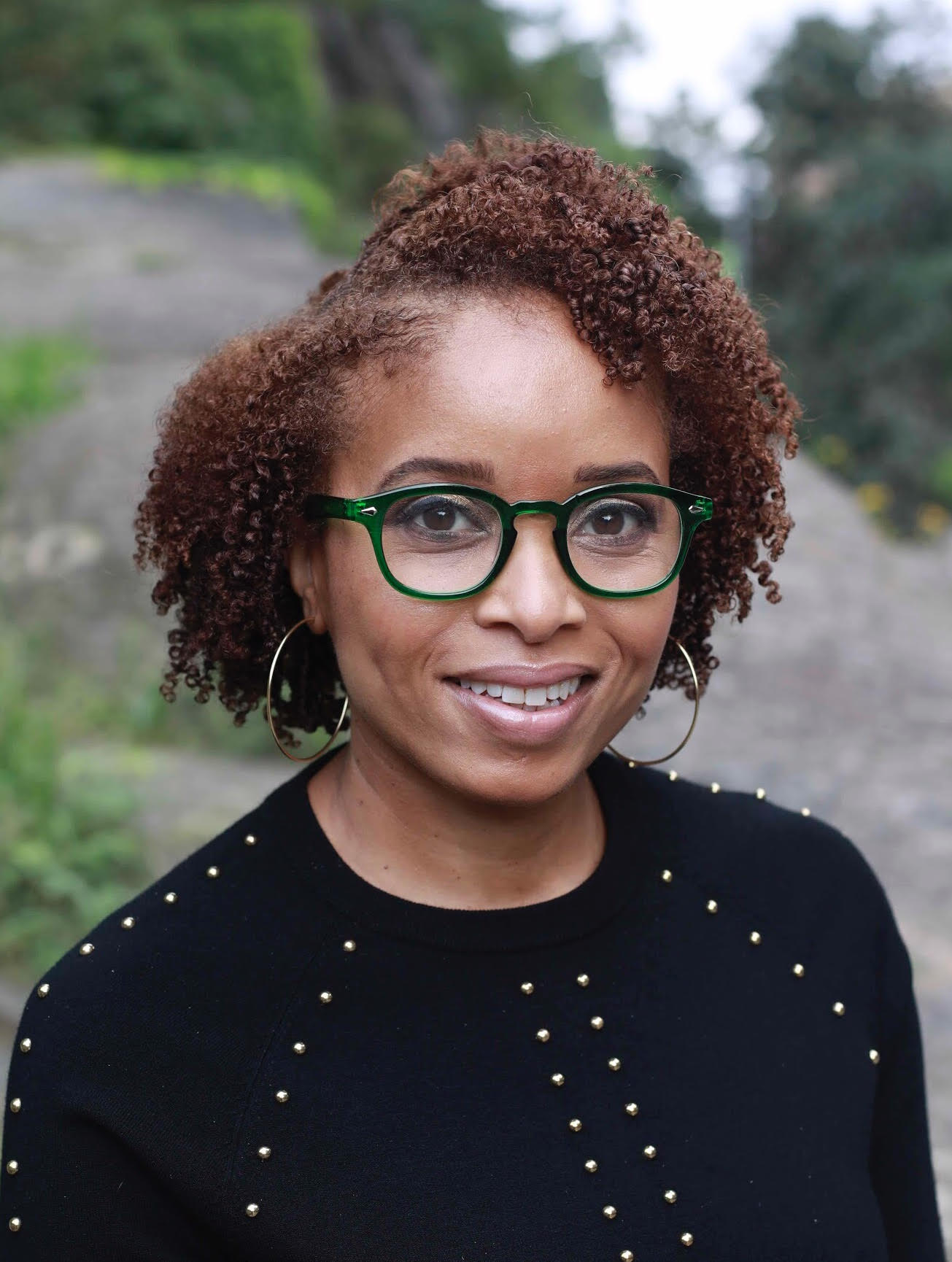
- Fleetwood in 2021
- Born: February 24, 1973
- Occupation: Curator

Nicole R. Fleetwood (born February 24, 1973) is an American academic, curator, police abolitionist, prison abolitionist, and author. She is the inaugural James Weldon Johnson Professor at New York University's Steinhardt School of Culture, Education, and Human Development. Previously, Fleetwood was Professor of American Studies and Art History at Rutgers University.

== Early life and education ==
Fleetwood grew up and attended public schools in Hamilton, Ohio, before briefly moving to Texas, then returning to graduate from Hamilton High School in 1990. She grew up in a large extended family of gospel, funk, and rock musicians. Her maternal relatives, the Troutmans, created the pioneering funk band Zapp. Fleetwood has spoken and written about the impact of music, policing, and imprisonment on her family and community.

In 1992, Fleetwood was chosen for the Erasmus International Exchange program to study human rights law and feminist studies at Utrecht University. In 1994, Fleetwood received a bachelor of philosophy degree (B.Phil.) from the School of Interdisciplinary Studies at Miami University of Ohio and her master's degree and doctorate in Modern Thought and Literature from Stanford University in 1998 and 2001, respectively.

== Career ==
Fleetwood's expertise is centered on contemporary black diasporic art and visual culture, gender and feminist studies, prison abolition, carceral studies and poverty studies.

From 2001 to 2003, Fleetwood began as the Andrew W. Mellon Postdoctoral Fellow in the Department of Film and Drama at Vassar College. In 2003, she joined the faculty of the Department of American Studies at University of California, Davis. She moved to Rutgers University, New Brunswick in 2005. Serving from 2013 to 2016, Fleetwood became the first Black director of the Institute for Research on Women at Rutgers.

In 2012, Fleetwood won the Lora Romero First Book Publication Prize of the American Studies Association for her book, Troubling Vision: Performance, Visuality and Blackness, published in 2011 with the University of Chicago Press. She published her second book, On Racial Icons: Blackness and the Public Imagination, in 2015 and a portion of it was translated into Italian for A fior di pelle: Bianchezza, nerezza, visualità, a collection of chapters and essays on race and visuality.

Fleetwood has organized several programs on visual culture, poverty studies, and carceral studies. In 2014, Fleetwood co-organized with her colleague Sarah Tobias Marking Time: Prison Art and Activism, a conference and six-site exhibition at Rutgers University based on research that she had begun in 2010 on the visual culture of mass incarceration. In 2017, she co-curated the exhibition, State Goods: Art in the Era of Mass Incarceration, with Walter E. Puryear at the Andrew Freedman Home in the Bronx. In 2018, Fleetwood collaborated with Aperture Foundation on Prison Nation, an issue of Aperture magazine and a traveling exhibition of the same name, focusing on photography's role in documenting mass incarceration.

In 2020, Harvard University Press published Marking Time: Art in the Age of Mass Incarceration, Fleetwood's decade-long study of the visual art and culture of contemporary prisons in the United States. The book has been included in several 2020 "best books" and selected reading lists by major media and cultural outlets such as the New York Times, The National Book Foundation and the Smithsonian. It won the 2020 National Book Critics Award in Criticism and became the only publication to win both the Charles Rufus Morey Book Award in art history and the Frank Jewett Mather Award in art criticism from the College Art Association. The exhibition Marking Time: Art in the Age of Mass Incarceration (September 17, 2020 – April 5, 2021) was also curated by Fleetwood at MoMA PS1 based on the text. The exhibition was listed as "one of the most important art moments in 2020" by The New York Times, and among the best shows of the year by The New Yorker and Hyperallergic.' Following the presentation at MoMA PS1, Marking Time: Art in the Age of Mass Incarceration was exhibited at the Abroms-Engel Institute for the Visual Arts at the University of Alabama at Birmingham (September 17, 2021 – December 11, 2021).

In 2021, Fleetwood joined New York University's Steinhardt School of Culture, Education, and Human Development as the inaugural James Weldon Johnson Professor.

Fleetwood has written art catalogue essays and cultural criticism on Angela Y. Davis, John Edmonds, Gordon Parks, Deana Lawson, Rihanna, Mickalene Thomas, Fatimah Tuggar, Diana Ross, Serena Williams, and LeBron James. Fleetwood's work has been covered by major media outlets including CNN, the Atlantic, National Public Radio, the New York Times, and The New Yorker.

== Awards and honors ==
- 2022 Mellon Foundation Grant for Prison Art Initiative, Andrew W. Mellon Foundation
- 2021 Susanne M. Glasscock Humanities Book Prize for Interdisciplinary Scholarship
- 2021 John Hope Franklin Publication Prize, American Studies Association
- 2021 MacArthur Fellowship
- 2021 Charles Rufus Morey Book Award in Art History, awarded by the College Art Association for Marking Time: Art in the Age of Mass Incarceration
- 2021 Frank Jewett Mather Award in Art Criticism awarded by the College Art Association for Marking Time: Art in the Age of Mass Incarceration
- 2020 National Book Critics Circle Award (Criticism) for Marking Time: Art in the Age of Mass Incarceration
- 2019 Academic Writing Fellow, The Rockefeller Foundation, Bellagio Center, Italy
- 2016-2017 ACLS/NYPL Fellow, Cullman Center for Scholars and Writers at the New York Public Library
- 2016-2017 Whiting Public Engagement Fellow
- 2012 Lora Romero First Book Publication Prize of the American Studies Association
- 2007-2008 National Endowment for the Humanities/Ford Foundation Fellow, Schomburg Scholar-in-Residence Program

== Books ==
- Marking Time: Art in the Age of Mass Incarceration (Harvard University Press, 2020)
- On Racial Icons: Blackness and the Public Imagination (Rutgers University Press, 2015)
- Troubling Vision: Performance, Visuality and Blackness (University of Chicago Press, 2011)

== Interviews ==
- NYC-ARTS Choice, WNET
- Morning Edition, NPR
- All of It with Alison Stewart
- Carceral Aesthetics, Conversation with novelist Rachel Kushner
- The Voices of Marking Time, MoMA Magazine Podcast
- Dreams Are Colder than Death 2014 documentary at IMDb
