= Tilda Lindstam =

Swedish model

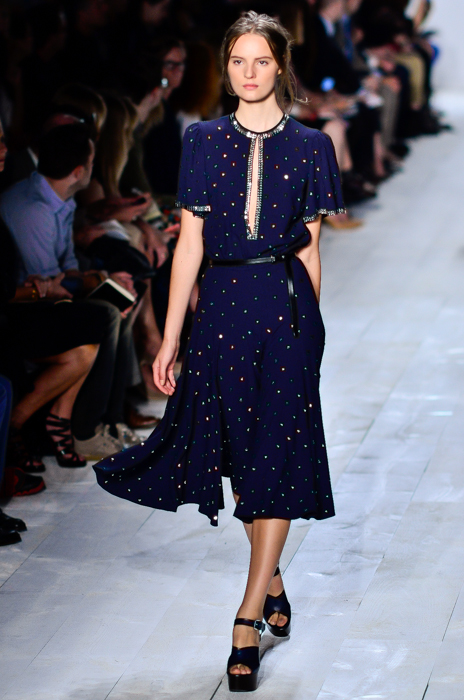
Tilda Lindstam walks the runway in a Michael Kors Spring-Summer 2014.

Tilda Lindstam is a Swedish model.

Lindstam was scouted at the age of 11 by the IMG modeling agency. She has walked the runway or appeared in advertising campaigns for brands such as H&M, Dries Van Noten, Mugler, Nina Ricci, Givenchy, Calvin Klein, Narciso Rodriguez, 3.1 Philip Lim, Rodarte, Tommy Hilfiger, Max Mara, Opening Ceremony, Dior, Etro, Dolce & Gabbana, Michael Kors, Tory Burch, Public School, Lacoste, Valentino, Jill Stuart, Kenzo, J.W. Anderson, Christopher Kane, Topshop, Jonathan Saunders, and Mulberry. In 2013, New York Magazine named Lindstam the "top model" of New York Fashion Week after appearing on the runway for 29 different designers.

Lindstam is known for her playful humor, which she shares with her many followers on Instagram. She lives in Manhattan.
