= Emon Shakoor =

Saudi neuroscientist and entrepreneur

- إيمان عبد الشكور
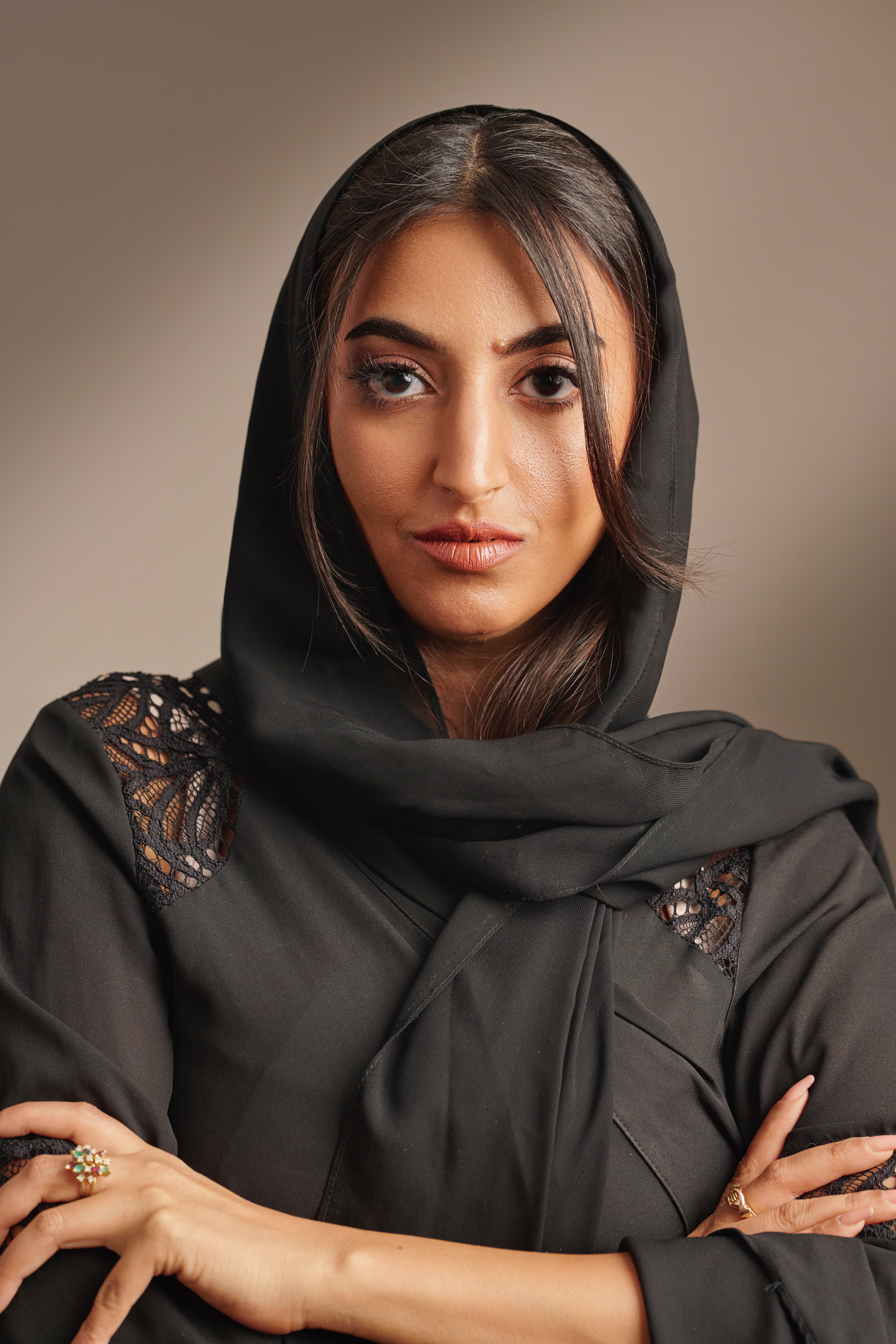
- إيمان عبد الشكور
- Education: University of California, San Diego
- Occupations: Neuroscientist, entrepreneur

Emon Shakoor (Arabic: إيمان عبد الشكور) is a Saudi neuroscience researcher turned a technology entrepreneur.

== Education ==
Prior to her career in entrepreneurship, Shakoor obtained her bachelor's degree in cognitive science from the University of California, San Diego (UCSD), and was a neuroscience researcher at UCSD investigating the role of mirror neurons in social cognition.

== Career ==
Shakoor is the sole founder and CEO of Blossom Accelerator, Saudi Arabia's first tech-inclusion and female focused accelerator. The company provides founders access to community, network, educational resources as well as curating investment opportunities. Emon also serves as an advisory board member at OQAL Angel Investment Network.

== Non-profit ==
Shakoor is a Jeddah Hub, Global Shaper, and was appointed as the delegate of 30 Under 30 group at the annual meeting of the World Economic Forum in Davos, Switzerland.

Shakoor co-founded a local non-profit startup event and initiative called the Techpreneurship Sprint in 2017. The event was in partnership with Prince Mohammad Bin Salman College of Business and Entrepreneurship. (MBSC). At this event the Saudi youth were challenged to build tech startups and think entrepreneurial.

== Awards and recognition ==
Shakoor's scientific research on mirror neurons was honored for its excellence at UCSD.

She was recognized as Saudi Arabia's youngest founder & CEO to be invited at the annual meeting of the World Economic Forum in Davos, Switzerland. She was also named in About Her's 20 Under 30 List.
