= Esmeralda Seay-Reynolds =

Esmeralda Seay-Reynolds is an American model, actress, filmmaker, and labor activist.
