= Mila Miletic =

Serbian fashion model (born 1991)

- Born: 5 August 1991 (age 33); Svetozarevo, SFR Yugoslavia
- Occupation: Fashion Model
- Modeling information
- Height: 5 ft 9 in (175 cm)
- Hair color: Dark Blonde
- Eye color: Blue
- Agency: Select Model Management (London); Place Models (Hamburg); Model Directors Management (Seoul)

Mila Miletic (Serbian: Mila Miletić / Мила Милетић, born 5 August 1991 in Svetozarevo) is a Serbian fashion model. Scouted by Jelena Ivanovic of Model Scouting Office, she began her career in 2012 after signing with Women Management Worldwide. She appeared on the cover of Elle magazine, Serbia (June 2012) and Blackbook (February 2013).

Featured in:

- Grazia (France)
- Grazia (Serbia)
- W
- Vs.
- Sleek
- Interview (Russia)
- 10 Magazine
