= Ajak Deng =

Australian fashion model

- Born: Ajak Deng; 7 December 1989 (age 36); Tonj, South Sudan
- Modeling information
- Height: 1.80 m (5 ft 11 in)
- Hair color: Black
- Eye color: Brown
- Agency: Chic Management (Sydney); IDAL MGMT (London)

Ajak Deng (born 7 December 1989) is a South Sudanese-Australian model.

== Early life ==
Deng was born in what is now known as South Sudan. Her family became refugees in Kenya before moving to Melbourne, Australia in 2005 due to the civil war in South Sudan. When she was 11 years old, her mother died of malaria. She then became the guardian of her 7 siblings .

== Career ==
Her first international modeling jobs included an advertisement for United Colors of Benetton and fashion shows for Valentino, Lanvin, Givenchy, Chloé, Maison Martin Margiela, Dior, Jean-Paul Gaultier, Oscar de la Renta, Alexander Wang, and Marc by Marc Jacobs. She has also modeled for Calvin Klein, Levi’s, Louis Vuitton, Gap, Inc., Nine West, Kate Spade, MAC Cosmetics, Kenzo, Topshop, Rick Owens, Thom Browne, Jason Wu, Hermès, Belstaff, Emilio Pucci, Sally Hansen, Thakoon, and Valentino.

Deng briefly quit modeling in 2016. She auditioned for the role of a Bond girl but was told she was "too pretty" for it. Since 2018, she has been one of the faces of Fenty Beauty.
