= Tiana Tolstoi =

French fashion model

- Born: September 22, 1994 (age 31); Cairo, Egypt
- Occupation: Model
- Modeling information
- Height: 1.80 m (5 ft 11 in)
- Hair color: Brown
- Eye color: Brown
- Agency: Marilyn Agency (New York City); New Madison (Paris); Fashion Model Management (Milan); Models 1 (London); Public Image Management (Montreal); YGKPLUS (Seoul)

Tiana Tolstoi (born September 22, 1994) is a French model.

== Career ==
Born in Cairo to a family of Korean, Serbian and Russian descent, Tolstoi was discovered on the street in Paris. Her first show was for Balenciaga. and she has also walked for Alexander McQueen, Alexander Wang, Marni, Stella McCartney and Versace. She was once signed with the now-defunct Trump Model Management.

She has appeared in ads for Lancôme, Calvin Klein, and Jimmy Choo.

Tolstoi has appeared in editorials for magazines such as Vogue Italia, V, and Numéro.
