= Peyton Knight =

American fashion model

- Born: July 24, 1998 (age 26); Rancho Mirage, California
- Modeling information
- Height: 1.75 m (5 ft 9 in)
- Hair color: Blonde
- Eye color: Blue
- Agency: Next Model Management (Los Angeles); Traffic Models (Barcelona); KT Management (mother agency)

Peyton Olivia Knight is an American fashion model.

== Early life ==
At age 11, Knight was discovered by Elite Model Management while leaving a movie theater with her mother; two years later she was signed to IMG Models.

== Career ==
While in high school, she worked in Tokyo for six weeks; after graduating early, she walked for Chanel in Rome and did a Gucci campaign. Her first job was an editorial for W photographed by Steven Meisel. Knight debuted as an Alexander Wang exclusive and like many models in that show she received a distinctive haircut from hairstylist Guido Palau.

Knight was chosen as a “Top Newcomer” by models.com, in 2015.
