= Nykhor Paul =

Sudanese fashion model

- Born: South Sudan
- Citizenship: South Sudanese
- Occupations: Fashion model, peace advocate
- Years active: 2000s–present

Nykhor Paul (Nuer: [ˈnjɔkɔr pɔl]) is a Sudanese fashion model.

Of Nuer ethnicity, Paul was born in what is now South Sudan. Owing to civil conflict, Paul escaped with her family to Ethiopia, where she grew up as a refugee. In 1998 Paul moved to the United States. She lived in Nebraska at age 14.

Based in New York, Paul has modelled for Vivienne Westwood, Rick Owens, Louis Vuitton and Balenciaga.
