= Campbell Addy =

British-Ghanaian photographer and filmmaker

- Born: March 19, 1993 (age 33); South London, England, United Kingdom
- Education: Central Saint Martins
- Occupations: Photographer; filmmaker; artist
- Years active: 2016–present

Campbell Addy (born March 19, 1993) is a British-Ghanaian photographer, filmmaker and artist. He is known working with high numbers of fashion clients Calvin Klein and more. In 2021, he joined Forbes 30 Under 30 list.

== Early life ==
Addy was born and raised in South London. His parents separated during his childhood and he was brought up by his Jehovah's Witness mother in a low-income community.

When he was 17, Addy's brother outed Campbell's sexual orientation to their mother after he had uncovered a photography of Campbell and a boyfriend in his bedroom. Fearing being sent to live with his Muslim father in Ghana, Addy fled home. He was taken in by the Albert Kennedy Trust and subsequently put into foster care with Richard Field, a gay artist living in South London. Addy has since reconciled with his family.

In 2010 Addy was tasked with reorganising the school library, where he discovered the books of Nick Knight, Norman Parkinson and Irving Penn and realised that the possibility of using photography in an artistic storytelling way.

Addy studied Fashion Communications at Central Saint Martins, where he realised he wanted to be a photographer after an encouraging conversation with friend Ib Kamara. In the final year of his degree he launched his own magazine and agency Nii Journal and Nii Agency.

== Career ==
Campbell Addy has worked with a number of fashion clients including Off-White, Calvin Klein, MAC. He has shot magazine covers for WSJ, Time, The Cut, Dazed and Rolling Stone, and photographed Tyler, the Creator, FKA Twigs, Naomi Campbell, Beyoncé, and Edward Enninful.

Addy's work has been exhibited in London, Paris, Melbourne, New York, Oslo, and Qatar, being part of exhibitions such as The New Black Vanguard at the Saatchi, Get Up Stand Up Now! At Somerset House and MAJOR at 180 the Strand.

Addy was included in Forbes 30 Under 30, and the New Wave British Fashion Awards in both 2018 and 2019.

His first monograph Feeling Seen: the Photographs of Campbell Addy debuted in 2022.

== Exhibitions ==
- I Love Campbell (stylized as I ♡ Campbell) @ 180 the Strand, 2023
- New School Represents: MAJOR @ 180 the Strand, 2022
- Campbell Addy: The British Fashion Council x British Embassy exhibition, Paris, 2022
- Haute Photographie @Amsterdam Museumsquare, 2022
- The New Black Vanguard @ Saatchi Gallery, 2022
- Feeling Seen @ Protein studios, London, 2022
- The New Black Vanguard w/ Aperture @ The Rencontres D’Arles, 2021
- The New Black Vanguard w/ Aperture @ Tasweer Photo Festival Qatar, 2021
- The New Black Vanguard w/ Aperture @ Bunjil Place Gallery Australia, 2020
- The Het Nieuwe Instituut in Rotterdam, 2019 – 2020
- Somerset House: Get Up Stand Up Now! 2019
- Matthew 7:7 & 8, 2017

== Publications ==
- Feeling Seen: The Photographs of Campbell Addy, 2022
- Niijournal III, 2018
- Unlocking Seoul, 2017
- Niijournal II, 2017
- Niijournal I, 2016

== Awards and recognitions ==
- The Agent's Club Awards (2020)
- Lovie Awards (2019)
- Creative Review – Zeitgeist Award (2017, 2018)
- Africa Media Works Photography Prize (2018)
- Stacks Best Magazine of the Year Award (2017)
- Dazed 100 (2017)
- British Fashion Awards: New Wave Creative (2018, 2019), Isabella Blow Award for Fashion Creator (2023).
- Nowness Award (2019)
- Forbes 30 Under 30 (2021)
- RPS (The Royal Photographic Society) Award for Fashion, Advertising and Commercial Photography (2024)
