= Kacper Kasprzyk =

Kacper Kasprzyk is a fashion photographer.

== Early life and education ==
Kasprzyk was born in Sweden, to a fashion designer mother. His interest in photography developed while he was enrolled at the art school Nyckelviksskolan, originally studying fashion design.

Kasprzyk's photography influences include Harry Callahan, Gregory Crewdson, and Gerhard Richter.

== Career ==
Kasprzyk's work has appeared in Dazed, Elle, French Vogue, Harper's Bazaar, GQ Style, i-D, and V magazine.

Kasprzyk photographed Brooklyn Beckham (son of David and Victoria Beckham) in clothing for Reserved, a leading clothing brand in Poland. He has a long-established professional relationship with designer Rick Owens and regularly photographs Owens's work.

Kasprzyk has also designed marketing campaigns for Gucci, Hermès, H&M, and Yves Saint Laurent, and created six short films featuring Versace designs for H&M.

== Awards ==
In 2012, Kasprzyk was a finalist in W magazine's "The Shot" competition for up-and-coming photographers. His photograph on the cover of the Röyksopp and Robyn EP Do It Again was awarded fifth place in Best Art Vinyl's list of the top ten album covers of 2014.
