= Éric Guillemain =

French photographer

Éric James Guillemain is a French photographer born in Morocco. He worked with Peter Lindbergh and photographed Vanessa Paradis for Vs. Magazine.

== Early life ==
Eric James Guillemain was born in Morocco and raised in Paris. He was the lead singer of the French rock band Venice, and moved to New York in 2002 to pursue a career in music. He ended up assisting photographer Peter Lindbergh.

== Career ==
In 2002 Eric moved to New York and was assisting world-renowned photographer Peter Lindbergh and eventually taking behind the scenes photos on Peter’s shoot and later on movie sets.

In 2010 Eric started his photography career and since then Eric works for international clients in advertising and editorial.

He photographed celebrities such as Isabelle Huppert, Diane Kruger, Norman Reedus, Vanessa Paradis, Anya Taylor Joy, Charlize Theron, Shailene Woodley, Sasha Lane, Jessica Alba, Dakota Johnson, Léa Seydoux, Keri Russell, Andie McDowell, Nick Cave, Rachel Weisz, Lou Doillon, Charlotte Gainsbourg, Jennifer Laurence, Carla Bruni, Adele Exarchopoulos, Famke Janssen, Lily Allen, Milla Jovovich, Clémence Poésy, Alicia Keys, Laetitia Casta, Jean Reno, Sigourney Weaver etc to name just a few.

In 2021 Eric James Guillemain has shown his work “Crosses”at 23 Pine Gallery.

Eric’s style can be described as stripped down and sudden without filters or device, connected directly through emotion.

Eric’s first book BACKSTAGE DREAMS published by Damiani will be released in 2025.

The book is inspired by Eugene Smith's backstage photo essay about Charlie Chaplin's Limelight. According to the cited source, it presents photographs of celebrities taken in natural settings and interior locations.
