= John Edmonds (artist) =

American photographer

- Born: 1989 (age 36–37); Washington, D.C.
- Education: Yale University School of Art; MFA, 2016; Corcoran School of the Arts and Design; BFA, 2012; L'École Parsons à Paris, France, 2011

John Edmonds (born 1989) is an artist working in photography who lives and works in Brooklyn, New York.

== Life and work ==
In his artistic practice, Edmonds explores themes of community, identity, and desire. Carrie Mae Weems describes Edmonds' as an artist who "re-imagines, and redefines the black man subject."

As of 2019, Edmonds is on faculty at Yale University and The School of Visual Arts.

He has had residencies at Light Work, Skowhegan School of Painting and Sculpture and Fabrica: The United Colors of Benetton's Research Center

== Exhibitions ==
- Whitney Biennial 2019, Whitney Museum of American Art, New York, NY. Curated by Rujeko Hockley and Jane Panetta.
- tete-a-tete, David Castillo Gallery, Miami, FL
- Do You See Me?, the Diggs Gallery at Winston-Salem University, Winston-Salem, North Carolina
- James Baldwin/Jim Brown & The Children, The Artist's Institute, New York, NY
- Lovers & Friends, Deli Gallery, Long Island City, NY

== Collections ==
- Philadelphia Museum of Art
- FOAM Museum Amsterdam Library
- George Eastman Museum
