= Pamela Hanson =

American photographer and filmmaker

- Born: 1954 (age 71–72); London
- Website: www.pamelahanson.com

Pamela Hanson (born 1954) is an American photographer and filmmaker, based in New York.

== Early life ==
Hanson was born in London and was raised in Geneva. She attended the American School in Lugano, Switzerland and later moved to the United States to pursue a degree in fine arts at the University of Colorado Boulder. After moving to Paris, she captured intimate portraits of friends which led to a career in photography. She currently resides in New York City and is represented Worldwide by LGA Management.

== Work ==
With over thirty years of experience in the fashion industry, Pamela Hanson's work has been featured in Vogue (American, French, British, German, Spanish, Italian, Russian, Chinese), Elle (American, French), Glamour (American, British, Italian), Porter, Harper's Bazaar (American, British, Australian), Vanity Fair (American, Italian, German), GQ (American, Australian), CR Fashion Book, InStyle, Town and Country, Telegraph Luxury, Stylist, Lula, Violet, and Lady. Other clients include: Estée Lauder, Dior, Furla, Ralph Lauren, Jimmy Choo, Lingua Franca, Avon, Gillette, J. Crew, Madewell, Esprit, Triumph, Yahoo Style, Clairol, Victoria’s Secret, Rent the Runway, Violet Grey, Reebok and Zenni Optical.

Her photographs have been sold to raise money for charities and organizations within the United States.

In June 2009, one of Hanson's ten nude photographs of Carla Bruni shot in 1994 was sold to an anonymous buyer for $19,600 at the spring auction at the Villa Grisebach Auktionen in Berlin.

Pamela Hanson has directed several video and television commercials for clients including Estée Lauder, Elizabeth and James, Avon, Warby Parker, L’Oreal, Johnson & Johnson, Charlotte Ronson, Stride Rite, Lubriderm, and the CFDA. Pamela also directed a series of television spots to raise funds for finding a Juvenile Diabetes cure and has received an award from the Association of Independent Commercial Producers (AICP) for her “Family Stories” short documentary, a public service announcement collaboration with The Partnership at Drugfree.org.

Hanson has directed television commercials; in June 2003, she directed a series of television spots to raise funds for finding a Juvenile Diabetes cure.

== Publications ==
- Girls (2001)
- Boys (2006)
- Private Room (2017)
- Pamela Hanson: The 90s (2025)

== Exhibitions ==
Hanson's photographs were on display at the Aperture Gallery in Fall 2008.

She is represented by New York gallery Staley-Wise. Her photographs were part of their exhibition Women Seeing Women.

== Collections ==
- Smithsonian American Art Museum
