= Tom Munro =

British photographer (born 1964)

Tom Munro (born 20 October 1964, England) is a British fashion, beauty and celebrity photographer based in London. His photography has been seen in editorial features and covers of many international magazines, such as Harpers Bazaar, V magazine, Vanity Fair, W magazine and Vogue. He has shot advertising campaigns for major fashion houses Dolce & Gabbana and Giorgio Armani, as well as campaigns for Guerlain, Givenchy, Lancome, Tom Ford and Yves Saint Laurent. He has directed commercials and films for Dolce & Gabbana 'Wild about Fall', Giorgio Armani 'Si' fragrance, Lancome 'Renergie' and Tom Ford 'Lips and Boys'.

Munro has shot iconic portraits and campaigns with celebrities such as Angelina Jolie, Leonardo DiCaprio, Cate Blanchett, Lady Gaga, Madonna, Nicole Kidman, Penelope Cruz, Reese Witherspoon, Rihanna, Scarlett Johansson.

== Career ==
Tom Munro studied photography at Parsons School of Design, New York. He began his career as an assistant to fashion photographer Steven Meisel. Munro embarked on his own photographic career in January 1997, shooting his first Vogue editorial in March of that year. After 20 years based in Manhattan, he returned to London in 2015, where he now lives and works.

In 2008, Munro started directing, débuting with Madonna’s music video ‘Give it 2 Me,’ the success of which led to four further film collaborations with ‘The Queen of Pop’, including ‘Die Another Day’ 2008 and ‘Justify My Love’ 2012.

In 2014 Munro became a member of the Directors Guild Of America.

== Solo exhibitions ==
- 2010, March. "Tom Munro", solo exhibition and book launch, Paris, France
- 2018, May. "72 Tokyo", solo exhibition

== Group exhibitions ==
- 2018, May. "A Shade Of Pale", group exhibition
- 2013, June. Camera Work "ROCKS", group exhibition

== Publications ==
- Tom Munro, 2010, published by Damiani ISBN 9788862081252

== Film ==
Director credits include "Give It 2 Me" 2008 and "Turn Up The Radio" 2013. “Die Another Day” 2008, “Justify My Love” 2012, “Human Nature” 2012.

== Press ==
1. (January 3, 1999) The Sunday Telegraph, Review, "Tom Munro, big shot".
2. (March 11, 2010) Elle, Culture, "Snap Judgment: Tom Munro".
3. (June 10, 2013) Welt, Kultur, "Die größten Hits der Popmusik-Fotografie".
4. (June 12, 2013) Berliner Morgenpost, Kultur, "Geschichten aus hundertundeinem Bild".
5. (Issue 10, 2018) S Magazine
6. (April, 2018) LFI Magazine, 72Tokyo
