= Nino Muñoz =

Chilean-Canadian photographer

Nino Muñoz is a Chilean-Canadian photographer.

== Early life and career ==
Born in San Antonio, Chile, Muñoz emigrated with his family to Canada in 1976. After living in Alberta for some time, the family settled in Richmond, British Columbia. In the early 1990s, Muñoz moved to New York City.

In 1999, Muñoz shot a fashion story for British Vogue with Gisele Bündchen. Muñoz has continued to work with Bündchen throughout his career and has photographed other actors such as Tom Cruise, Hilary Swank, Leonardo DiCaprio, Julianne Moore, Don Cheadle, Adrien Brody, Maggie Gyllenhaal, Sam Rockwell, Jay-Z, Christina Aguilera, Beyoncé, Daniel Craig, and Jake Gyllenhaal.

He is also an advertising photographer, with clients such as Bruno Magli, Lexus, Dune, Colcci, Rosa Cha, Misha, Falabella, Victoria's Secret, True Religion, Vero Moda, and London Fog. Muñoz has also worked with TV & entertainment networks including HBO, The CW, BBC America, NBC, Fox Broadcasting Company, CBS, Warner Bros., and Space.

Muñoz has worked with the nonprofit organization The Art of Elysium, and in 2007, he collaborated with The Art of Elysium and French Connection to host a photography exhibition, the proceeds of which benefited The Art of Elysium.

In 2008, Muñoz and Bündchen collaborated for the 30th anniversary of American Photo magazine.

A selection of Muñoz's photographs were on display in the "Beauty CULTure" exhibit at The Annenberg Space for Photography in Los Angeles in 2012.
