= Norman Jean Roy =

Canadian photographer

- Born: Norman Jean Roy; August 19, 1969 (age 56); Sherbrooke, Quebec, Canada
- Occupation: Photographer
- Website: www.normanjeanroy.com

Norman Jean Roy (born 1969) is a Canadian born portrait photographer. Roy is best known for his portraits of celebrities, socialites and personalities. His portraits have appeared on the covers and pages of Vogue, Vanity Fair, GQ, Allure, Harper's Bazaar, and Rolling Stone.

== Early life and education ==
Roy was born in Sherbrooke, Quebec, Canada. At the age of 6 he started taking an interest in photography. At fourteen, his family relocated to the United States, where Roy learned English. He attended high school in Southbury, Connecticut. After studying architecture and design, Roy worked for the design department at General Motors' Saturn division in Nashville, Tennessee.

== Photography career ==
Two years later, he purchased a 35mm camera and began photographing friends and local models. Finding the industry difficult and competitive, he left photography and pursued a career in golf. In 1994, American Photo magazine published a cover story about Richard Avedon, which Roy credits as his motivation to pursuing portrait photography again. After six months in France, Roy returned to Nashville to cultivate his portrait work and refine his technical skills.

Roy is now based in New York and is represented worldwide by Art + Commerce and AUGUST for licensing & syndication

== Exhibitions ==
- Traffik, Milk Studios, New York, NY 2008
