= Mariano Vivanco =

Peruvian photographer

- Born: Mariano Vivanco; December 15, 1975 (age 49); Lima, Peru
- Known for: Fashion photographer
- Website: marianovivanco.com

Mariano Vivanco (born 15 December 1975) is a Peruvian fashion and portrait photographer. He traveled the world with his family, who eventually settled down in New Zealand. Mariano moved to London in the year 2000 to pursue his career as a fashion photographer.

Vivanco has since become an editorial photographer, regularly shooting for Vogue, Harper's Bazaar, Muse magazine, Dazed & Confused, Vogue Hommes Nippon, Numéro, Numéro Homme, i-D, DSection magazine, Hercules, and GQ.

His portraits, nudes, and editorial work (in both men's and womenswear) are often in black and white. His subjects have included actors, athletes, singers, and models such as Cindy Crawford, Rihanna, Lady Gaga, Naomi Campbell, Eva Herzigova, Emma Watson, Ricky Martin, Lionel Messi, Eva Mendes, Miranda Kerr, Chloë Sevigny, Dita von Teese, Donatella Versace, Dolce & Gabbana, Sir Paul Smith, Cristiano Ronaldo, Lana Del Rey, Daniel Radcliffe, and Sam Smith.

The National Portrait Gallery, London displays three of his works: a portrait of model Lily Cole, one of stylist (and frequent collaborator) Nicola Formichetti, and one of choreographer Rafael Bonachela, (commissioned for i-D Magazine in 2004).

Vivanco has also produced films. He began with experimental videos having models mime to his favorite songs. These soon translated into spots for Dolce & Gabbana, Cesare Paciotti and Pull and Bear. He created a video piece for the Thierry Mugler menswear show in January 2011 featuring Rick Genest, known as "Zombie Boy".

In 2013 Vivanco was named as one of the ‘500 Most Influential People In Fashion’ by the Business of Fashion.

== Early life ==
Mariano Vivanco was born in Lima in 1975, and was raised around the world, including Peru, New Zealand, as well as the United States.

He moved to London in the year 2000. Vivanco got his start in the industry by making model portfolios, something he later turned into a book project, Ninety Five Chapel Market. Within a few years Vivanco was regularly shooting for magazines.

== Career ==
Vivanco got his start in the fashion industry by shooting portraits of models in London. After numerous shoots, he began to work more often for Dazed & Confused. In 2001, while working for Dazed, Vivanco met stylist Nicola Formichetti with whom he worked shooting several covers for the British magazine.

Vivanco has also published several books for the Dolce & Gabbana label: Calcio (2003), Milan (2004), Nationale (2006) and Milan Family (2007). The 2011 publication Uomini has received international recognition. David Gandy by Dolce & Gabbana (a 2011 publication) is a portrait of model David Gandy's career and his relationship with the fashion house Dolce & Gabbana.

In 2006, he was asked to shoot the French rugby team for the Dieux du Stade Calendar for 2007.

In 2007, Vivanco held his debut solo exhibition at the Print Space Gallery in east London, supported by Dazed & Confused. Here, he exhibited two editorial stories produced for Dazed entitled Cult and Artist. His second exhibition followed quickly, this time in Milan's Gold Restaurant. Here, he exhibited his images of the model David Gandy for Dolce & Gabbana's 2008 calendar.

Later, in 2008, Vivanco published Ninety Five Chapel Market, a retrospective look at his first years in London. It also documented Sienna Miller, David Gandy, and Lily Cole at the start of their careers. The collection was named after his first London address.

In the fall of 2011, Vivanco photographed Emma Watson for i-D magazine. He shot model David Gandy for the Dolce & Gabbana Fall/Winter 11/12 Eyewear Campaign, as well as the cover and fashion editorial photoshoot for Attitude. Vivanco also photographed Rick Genest for the Thierry Mugler French fashion house revival in 2011. Vivanco teamed with Nicola Formichetti and Lady Gaga to produce a video titled "Anatomy of Change," featuring a remix of Gaga's song "Scheiße." Later that year, Vivanco shot Lady Gaga for the British i-D magazine's Exhibitionist issue, featuring clothing from the Thierry Mugler fashion house.

In December 2012, Vivanco’s Personal Project was released, showcasing new nude work, accompanied by a short film which he also directed.

Lana Del Rey was also shot by Vivanco for both British GQ and Numéro Tokyo.

In 2013, Vivanco photographed a collaboration with British artist Damien Hirst and Rihanna for the 25th Anniversary of British GQ. Crowning 2013 was Vivanco’s inclusion one of the "500 Most Influential People In Fashion" by the Business of Fashion.

2014 included more work with Rihanna, Candice Swanepoel and other models for Vogue Brazil. Vivanco also captured the cover of British GQ with his shot of Colin Firth.

2015 saw Vivanco work with Georgia May Jagger for numerous campaigns for Sunglass Hut and shoot various other campaigns, including images for Cesare Paciotti and Joop.

In 2016, Vivanco began a relationship with Bernheimer Gallery showing in Paris Photo, Munich Highlights, Art Geneve, and Masterpiece London. He shot model Karlie Kloss for a Vogue Russia spread and cover. He also shot Jasmine Sanders for Lui magazine.

WWD wrote about his book Portraits Nudes Flowers (2016) in their Fashion Scoops and the retrospective collection of 15 years of work was described as "an aria in monochrome" by website Fucking Young.

Early 2017 saw another collaboration with Rihanna, this time for the March issue of Harper’s Bazaar USA.

The April 2017 cover of British GQ featured Vivanco’s photographs of boxer Anthony Joshua.

Between 2017 and 2025, Vivanco had numerous notable exhibitions, including Bling Bling Baby at NRW-Forum Museum (Dusseldorf, 2017), ArtGenève Art Fair by Bernheimer Fine Art Photography (Geneva, 2017), 25 - G&M Design Gallery (Monaco, 2020), Terrence Higgins Trust Charity Auction by Christie’s (London, 2023), PERU at G&M Design Gallery (Monaco, 2023), PERU at Frieze Art Fair (London, 2023), Photo London (2024), Phillip's "Seeing Red", and Orchids Festival (2025).
