= Sebastián Faena =

Argentine Filmmaker & Musician

- Born: 15 September 1984; Buenos Aires, Argentina
- Occupations: Photographer; Musician; Filmmaker
- Website: sebastianfaena.com

Sebastián Faena is a photographer, singer-songwriter and filmmaker.

== Early life ==
Faena was born and raised in Buenos Aires, Argentina. He studied literature and music at Columbia University.

== Career ==
His first feature film premiered as a work in progress at the 2007 Mar Del Plata Film Festival, where the lead actress, Dolores Fonzi, won Best Actress.

Over the last two decades, he has shot for magazines 032c, Vogue Italia, Harper's Bazaar, Vanity Fair, Pop, CR Fashion Book, V Magazine and many others, collaborating with the likes of Cindy Crawford, Naomi Campbell, Bella Hadid, Cara Delevingne, Lady Gaga, Rihanna, Penelope Cruz, Sigourney Weaver, Amelia Gray to name some.

He directed a short film 'Those Wrecked by Success' in 2015, starring Gigi Hadid.

In 2016 he was named Photographer of the Year at the Fashion Media Awards, awarded by Celine Dion.

He premiered his short film Fernando, at the Palais des Festivals et des Congrès during the 2018 Cannes Film Festival.

In 2021, he released his first EP with songs 'Save Your Life' (featuring Gray Sorrenti) and 'Artificial Irresistible'.
