= Brigitte Lacombe =

American photographer

Brigitte Lacombe (born December 23, 1950, in Alès, France) is an American photographer based in New York City. In May 2009, she published a collection "Lacombe anima/persona" with her photographs covering her work from 1975 to 2008. Her work has been published in many magazines, including Vanity Fair, Glamour, The New Yorker, GQ, New York and The New York Times Magazine.

Lacombe is famous for her raw techniques for shooting her portraits: “The situation I create is devoid of production values… I try to make it as bare as possible so it’s about them as them. And that’s it.” "“I know that once I set the tone by bringing people to a set that I want – meaning the lights, the intimacy of the space, the quietness, and the fact I stay one-on-one with them – I’m asking for the person in front of me to collaborate with me. It’s not just me imposing something; I want an exchange”.

At age seventeen, Lacombe left school to pursue photography as an apprentice with the black and white lab for Elle in Paris. Her first assignment was the 1975 Cannes Film Festival.

Lacombe started working at the black and white lab of Elle in Paris when she left school. She went to the 1975 Cannes Film Festival, where she met Dustin Hoffman and Donald Sutherland and started to photograph on film sets. She worked on the movies of Sam Mendes, David Mamet, Martin Scorsese, and others.
