= Mario Sorrenti =

Italian-American photographer, director

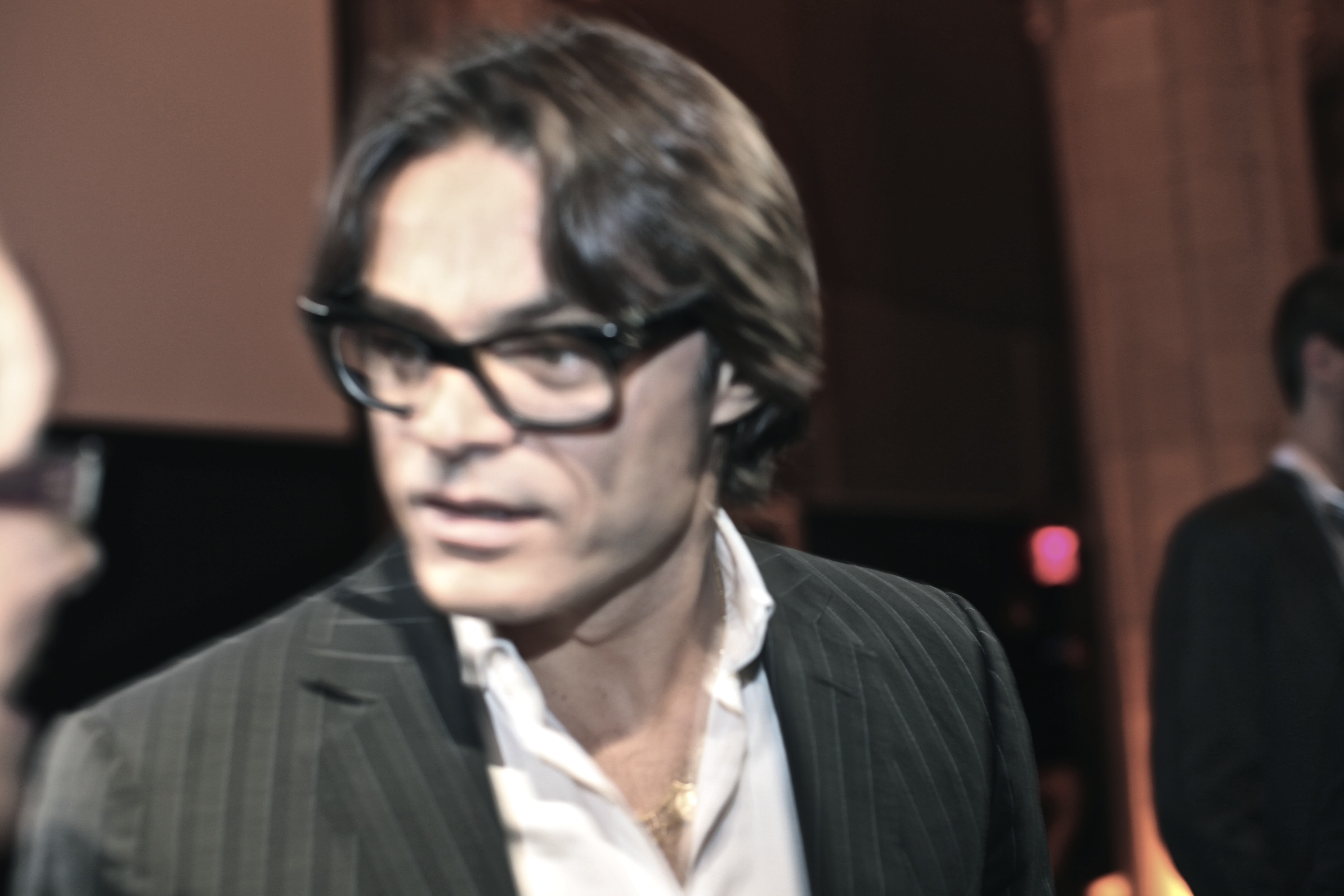
- Sorrenti at the 2012 Pirelli Calendar launch
- Born: October 24, 1971 (age 54); Naples, Italy
- Occupation: Photographer
- Notable work: Obession by Kate Moss (1993)
- Relatives: Davide Sorrenti (brother)

Mario Sorrenti (born October 24, 1971) is an Italian-American photographer best known for his spreads of nude models in the pages of Vogue and Harper's Bazaar.

== Early life ==
Sorrenti was born in Naples, Italy, and moved to New York City at the age of ten where he is still based. He is the son of New York-based creative director and fashion photographer Francesca Sorrenti. He is the older brother of fashion photographer Davide Sorrenti, who died from a kidney ailment in February 1997.

== Career ==
Sorrenti has held exhibitions in London (Victoria and Albert Museum), Paris, Monaco and New York City (Museum of Modern Art). He has undertaken campaigns and directed commercials for Calvin Klein, and has shot Kate Moss for the Calvin Klein Obsession ads. Sorrenti met Moss while working on an early 'Levis for Girls' campaign for The Design Corporation and Levi's. He has also worked for Lancôme, Paco Rabanne, Benetton and Pirelli Calendar 2012. He is currently signed exclusively with the agency Art Partner.

Mario starred in the 1991 Pool Hall Clash ad for Levi's showing his skills on the other side of the camera.

Sorrenti is responsible for the photographs on several music releases, most notably Shakira's Fijación Oral Vol. 1, as well as R&B artist Maxwell's album Embrya and a solo album by John Taylor of Duran Duran. His first musical project was the photography for rock group Del Amitri's 1995 album, Twisted, and its associated single releases.

== Videography ==
- 2004: John Mayer - "Daughters"

== Publications ==
- The Machine. Göttingen: Steidl; Paris: Garibaldi, 2004. ISBN 3-88243-793-6. A photographic study of Davide Sorrenti, his younger brother and fashion photographer, who died in 1997.
- Draw Blood for Proof, Mario Sorrenti. Göttingen: Steidl, 2011. ISBN 978-3-86930-303-1.
- Kate. Phaidon, 2018. ISBN 978-07-148-7680-1.
