= Cover model =

Model who appears on a magazine cover

A cover model is a male or female whose photograph appears on the front cover of a magazine. The cover model is generally a fashion model, celebrity, or contest winner. Generally, cover models are depicted solitarily; however, on occasion magazines will present a front cover with multiple cover models. Female cover models are often referred to as cover girls.

Cover models generally take part in a fashion or portrait photography photo shoot for the magazine. When a magazine depicts a candid or stock image for the main cover image, the talent is referred to as the magazine "cover" rather than "cover model" or "cover girl".

== See also ==
- List of Allure cover models
- List of Marie Claire cover models
- List of Sports Illustrated Swimsuit Issue cover models
- List of Vogue cover models
