= Alexi Lubomirski =

British photographer (born 1975)

- Born: Alex Jan Lubomirski; 26 August 1975 (age 51); London, England
- Education: University of Brighton
- Occupations: Photographer, author
- Website: www.alexilubomirski.com

Alex Jan Lubomirski (born 26 August 1975), professionally known as Alexi Lubomirski, is an English photographer best known for taking the official photographs of Prince Harry and Meghan Markle for their engagement and wedding.

== Early life ==
He was born in London, England, to an English-Peruvian mother and a Polish-French father and raised between England and Botswana with his mother. He studied at Magdalen College School, Oxford until 1994 (and now is an Old Waynflete), then he studied at the University of Brighton and became Mario Testino’s photography assistant.

== Later life ==
He lives in New York City as a fashion photographer and has had work published in Harper's Bazaar US, Vogue (Mexico, Germany, Russia, Spain, Korea, China), Men's Vogue China, Numero Tokyo, W Korea, GQ USA, and Allure. He has photographed Demi Moore, Beyonce, Charlize Theron, Gwyneth Paltrow, Natalie Portman and many others.

He wrote a book entitled Princely Advice for a Happy Life for his two sons and it has been translated into six languages. He has also published two books of photographs, Decade (2014) and Diverse Beauty (2016).

In May 2018, a set of commemorative postage stamps, featuring Lubomirski's official engagement photographs of Prince Harry and Meghan Markle, was issued by Royal Mail to mark the couple's wedding. He photographed the Sussex family again for their 2021 Christmas card, which was also their daughter Lilibet's first publicly released photo.

== Family ==
Lubomirski is the son of Władysław Jan Adam Lubomirski (born 1 January 1949) and his first wife, Eileen Pamela Beardsell (born 1947), an Englishwoman of Peruvian descent. He is a member of the House of Lubomirski, a Polish princely family.

On 8 August 2009 at Nowy Wiśnicz Castle Lubomirski married Giada Lubomirski (née Torri). Together they have two sons. They reside in New York. His wife Giada looks up to Candace Owens and shares her content consistently, stating that she agrees with Owens on numerous topics, particularly about Israel and Gaza. She voted for Jill Stein in the 2024 election, despite building a following from the Black Lives Matter movement and vowing to "protect Black women at all costs." Alexi has stated he supports his wife's political stances and is proud of how she uses her voice.
