= List of Polish models =

The Polish fashion industry has actively developed since the 1990s. It remains relatively small and is primarily centered in Warsaw. The modeling market is predominantly commercial and focused on TV advertisements. Polish models often travel abroad to participate in shows in Paris, Milan, London, and New York.

== List ==
| Name | Birth year | Height | Career start | Notes |
|---|---|---|---|---|
| Julia Banas | 1997 | 1.80 m (5 ft 11 in) | 2016 | |
| Zofia Batycka | 1907 | | | Miss Polonia 1930 |
| Małgosia Bela | 1977 | 1.77 m (5 ft 9 1/2 in) | 1998 | |
| Zuzanna Bijoch | 1994 | 1.80 m (5 ft 11 in) | 2010 | |
| Bogna Sworowska | 1967 | 1.79 m (5 ft 10 1/2 in) | 1983 | |
| Joanna Borov | 1993 | 1.73 m (5 ft 8 in) | | |
| Claudia Ciesla | 1987 | 1.75 m (5 ft 9 in) | 2003 | |
| Marzena Cieślik | 1981 | 1.76 m (5 ft 9 1/2 in) | | Miss Polonia 2006 |
| Ilona Felicjańska | 1970 | 1.78 m (5 ft 10 in) | | |
| Magdalena Frąckowiak | 1984 | 1.80 m (5 ft 11 in) | 2000 | |
| Lena Góra | 1990 | | | |
| Joanna Horodyńska | 1975 | 1.75 m (5 ft 9 in) | | |
| Jac Jagaciak | 1994 | 1.79 m (5 ft 10 1/2 in) | 2007 | |
| Anna Jagodzińska | 1987 | 1.77 m (5 ft 9 1/2 in) | 2003 | |
| Angelika Jakubowska | 1989 | 1.76 m (5 ft 9 1/2 in) | | Miss Polonia 2008 |
| Magdalena Jasek | 1993 | 1.80 m (5 ft 11 in) | | |
| Angelika Jurkowianiec | 1996 | 1.80 m (5 ft 11 in) | | |
| Magda Konopka | 1943 | | | |
| Dorota Krzysztofek | 1980 | | | |
| Monika Lewczuk | 1988 | 1.77 m (5 ft 9 1/2 in) | 2009 | |
| Rozalia Mancewicz | 1987 | 1.75 m (5 ft 9 in) | | Miss Polonia 2010 |
| Magdalena Mielcarz | 1978 | 1.77 m (5 ft 9 1/2 in) | | |
| Ewa Pacuła | 1971 | 1.73 m (5 ft 8 in) | 1990 | |
| Agnieszka Popielewicz | 1985 | | 2002 | |
| Anna Przybylska | 1978 | | | |
| Małgorzata Rożniecka | 1978 | 1.78 m (5 ft 10 in) | | Miss International 2001 |
| Anja Rubik | 1983 | 1.79 m (5 ft 10 1/2 in) | 1999 | |
| Ola Rudnicka | 1994 | 1.79 m (5 ft 10 1/2 in) | | |
| Izabella Scorupco | 1970 | 1.73 m (5 ft 8 in) | | |
| Kasia Struss | 1987 | 1.79 m (5 ft 10 1/2 in) | | |
| Kornelia Strzelecka | 1993 | 1.72 m (5 ft 7 1/2 in) | 2008 | |
| Kamila Szczawińska | 1986 | 1.78 m (5 ft 10 in) | 2001 | |
| Karolina Szymczak | 1991 | 1.76 m (5 ft 9 1/2 in) | | |
| Paulina Tomborowska | 1975 | 1.68 m (5 ft 6 in) | 1991 | |
| Karolina Wydra | 1981 | 1.75 m (5 ft 9 in) | 1997 | |
| Iga Wyrwał | 1989 | 1.68 m (5 ft 6 in) | | |
| Eva Zuk | 1991 | 1.76 m (5 ft 9 1/2 in) | | |

== Biographies ==
=== Eva Zuk ===
Eva Zuk (born 14 May 1991) is a Polish model and fashion influencer. She was trained in gymnastics and swimming during her childhood. She developed an interest in fashion as a teenager and began working as a model in London at age 16. After completing her undergraduate studies, she earned a master's degree in law in London. Zuk began her modeling career with FashionTV in France before joining Premier Model Management in London. She appeared on the covers of magazines including FHM, L'Officiel, New York Fashion Magazine, and Fashion Magazine NYC
