= List of Vogue Ukraine cover models =

This list of Vogue Ukraine cover models (2013–present) is a catalog of cover models who have appeared on the cover of Vogue Ukraine, the Ukrainian edition of American fashion magazine Vogue.

== 2010s ==
=== 2013 ===
Issue	Cover model	Photographer
March	Daria Werbowy	Steven Pan
April	Zuzanna Bijoch	Jeff Bark
May	Eugene Hütz & Kätlin Aas	Mark Seliger
June	Karolína Kurková	Hans Feurer
July	Olga Kurylenko	Phil Poynter
August	Meghan Collison	Olivier Zahm
September	Guinevere Van Seenus	Cüneyt Akeroğlu
October	Irina Kravchenko	Sebastian Kim
November	Jessica Stam	Chad Pitman
December	Marie Piovesan	Sofia Sanchez & Mauro Mongiello

=== 2014 ===
Issue	Cover model	Photographer
January	Toni Garrn	Benny Horne
February	Isabeli Fontana	Marcin Tyszka
March	Suvi Koponen	Cüneyt Akeroğlu
April	Sigrid Agren	Steven Pan
May	Lindsey Wixson	Jeff Bark
June	Arizona Muse	Cüneyt Akeroğlu
July	Małgosia Bela	Victor Demarchelier
August	Marina Abramović & Crystal Renn	Dusan Reljin
September	Karen Elson	Yelena Yemchuk
October	Hana Jiříčková	Nagi Sakai
November	Missy Rayder	Stockton Johnson
December	Elisabeth Erm	Driu Crilly & Tiago Martel

=== 2015 ===
Issue	Cover model	Photographer
January	Carmen Kass	Egor Zaika
February	Nadja Auermann	Arcin Sagdic
March	Caroline Trentini	Tom Munro
April	Vanessa Paradis	Marcin Tyszka
May	Georgia May Jagger	Marcin Tyszka
June	Ola Rudnicka	Arcin Sagdic
July	Hilary Rhoda	Jack Waterlot
August	Tatyana Kolovanova; Tereza Holanova; Sandra Nadja; Lauren Bigelow; Brigitta Liivak; Charlotte Goussin; Sasha Abi; Marta Campagna; Magdalena Wodowska	Vanessa Beecroft
September	Guinevere Van Seenus	Steven Pan
October	Nadja Bender	Marcin Tyszka
November	Nils & Lou Schoof	Elizaveta Porodina
December	Karmen Pedaru	Dusan Reljin

=== 2016 ===
Issue	Cover model	Photographer
January	Larissa Hofmann	Nagi Sakai
February	Alisa Ahmann	Ellen von Unwerth
March	Iana Godnia	Phil Poynter
March	Kriss Kulyk	Catherine Servel
March	Yulia Musieichuk	Synchrodogs
April	Sarah Abney	Choi Yong Bin
May	Joséphine Le Tutour	An Le
June	Emily DiDonato	Bon Duke
July	Anais Mali & Riley Montana	Hans Neumann
August	Olympia Scarry	Alexandra Gordienko
September	Lili Sumner	Baud Postma
October	Milla Jovovich	An Le
November	Lena Hardt	Nagi Sakai
December	Jessica Chastain	Dusan Reljin

=== 2017 ===
Issue	Cover model	Photographer
January	Vita Filonenko & Kristina Abibulayeva	Elizaveta Porodina
February	Anja Rubik	Chris Colls
March	Anna Cleveland	Yelena Yemchuk
April	Amber Valletta	Chris Colls
May	Lera Abova	Benjamin Vnuk
June	Doutzen Kroes & Oribe Canales	Chris Colls
July	Sofia Mechetner & Xavier Buestel	Yaniv Edry
August	Chloë Sevigny	Nan Goldin
September	Charlee Fraser	Alexander Saladrigas
October	Małgosia Bela	Chris Colls
November	Othilia Simon	Alique
December	Dorit Revelis	Jens Ingvarsson

=== 2018 ===
Issue	Cover model	Photographer
January	Alek Wek	Alexander Saladrigas
February	Aymeline Valade	Tung Walsh
March	Julia Ratner & Pasha Harulia	Reto Schmid
April	Charlotte Gainsbourg	Casper Sejersen
May	Giedrė Dukauskaitė	Nagi Sakai
June	Taja Feistner	Alexander Saladrigas
July	Marte Mei van Haaster	Alexander Saladrigas
August	Yann-Edouard; Coco Capitán; Eric-Emmanuel	Coco Capitán
September	Lara Stone	Quentin de Briey
October	Rose Daniels	Tina Tyrell
November	Stella Lucia	Leon Mark
December	Karen Elson	Patrick Bienert

=== 2019 ===
Issue	Cover model	Photographer
January	Juliane Grüner	Mélanie Lyon & Ramon Escobosa
February	Ansolet Rossouw	Till Janz
March	Vivien Solari	Jo Metson Scott
April	Elouane Duval-Genter; Edwina Preston; Nicolas Doué	Ronan Gallagher
May	Alba Rohrwacher	Stefano Galuzzi
June	Mariam de Vinzelle	Leon Mark
July	Shanelle Nyasiase	Nadine Ijewere
August	Krow Kian	Paul Sepuya
September	Lulu Tenney	Stuart Winecoff
October	Carolina Burgin	Vanina Sorrenti
November	Shelby Hayes	Milan Zrnic
December	Olena Zelenska	Paul Bellaart

== 2020s ==
=== 2020 ===
Issue	Cover model	Photographer/Artist
January	Abby Champion	Derek Henderson
February	Margaret Qualley	Yorgos Lanthimos
March	Lara Mullen	Bruno Staub
April	Kaya Wilkins	James Brodribb
May-June	—N/a	Yelena Yemchuk (Illustration)
July-August	Giselle Norman	Leon Mark
September	Viktoria Lulko	Melanie + Ramon
October	Anouck Lepère	Paul Kooiker
November	Tilda Swinton	Anton Corbijn
December 2019/January 2020	Luna Bijl	Liz Collins

=== 2021 ===
Issue	Cover model	Photographer
February	Sara Blomqvist	Cedric Bihr
March	Zso Varju	Johnny Kangasniemi
April	Ruth Bell	Nagi Sakai
May/June	Edie Campbell	Hill & Aubrey
July/August	Tess McMillan	Petra Collins
September	Vira Boshkova	Lukas Wassman
October	Kiki Willems	Pierre Ange Carlotti
November	Ashley Radjarame	Dan Beleiu
December	Mica Argañaraz	Pierre et Gilles

=== 2022 ===
Issue	Cover model	Photographer
February/March	Britt Oosten	Marie Deteneuille
Publication on hold due to Russian Invasion of Ukraine
September (digital cover)	Olena Zelenska	Annie Leibovitz

=== 2023 ===
Issue	Cover model	Photographer/Artist
Publication restarted
Spring	—N/a	Vasylyna Vrublevska
Summer	Pasha Harulia, Sasha Vodniy	Patrick Bienert
Autumn	Yaroslava Mahuchikh	Alexander Saladrigas
Autumn	Elina Monfils	Nagi Sakai
Autumn	Kharlan Olga	Toby Coulson
Winter	Pasha Harulia, Sasha Vodniy	Umit Savaci

=== 2024 ===
Issue	Cover model	Photographer
Spring	Karyna Maziar and Cadets of the Military Lyceum	Brett Lloyd
Spring	Oksana Rubaniak	Brett Lloyd
Summer	Tiama	Ania Brudna
Autumn	Ylang Messengurial	Alexander Saladrigas
Winter	Mariam de Vinzelle	Karolina Pukowiec

=== 2025 ===
Issue	Cover model	Photographer
Spring	Yura Romaniuk, Vika Parmakova, Karnya Maziar	Julia Noni
Summer	Veronika Kunz	Marcus Ohlsson
Autumn	Karolina Rossoshanska, Max Voloshyn	Stephan Lisowski
Winter	Yura Romaniuk, Jack Shippy	Stuart Winecoff

=== 2026 ===
Issue	Cover model	Photographer
Spring	Oleksandr Usyk	Charlie Gray
Summer	Freya Nutter	Gladys Tan
Autumn	Kris Krystal	Olu Odukoya
