= List of Vogue Czechoslovakia cover models =

This list of Vogue Czechoslovakia cover models (2018–present) is a catalog of cover models who have appeared on the cover of Vogue Czechoslovakia, the Czech and Slovak edition of American fashion magazine Vogue. The magazine is also known as Vogue CS.

== 2010s ==
=== 2018 ===
Issue	Cover model	Photographer	Ref.
September	Karolína Kurková	Branislav Šimončík	
October	Lara Stone	Rankin	
November	Anna Cleveland	Laura Marie Cieplek	
November	Lili Sumner	Dan Beleiu	
December	Kirsten Owen	Michal Pudelka	

=== 2019 ===
Issue	Cover model	Photographer	Ref.
January/February	Eva Herzigová	Pamela Hanson	
March	Karen Elson	Michal Pudelka	
April	Grace Hartzel	Dan Beleiu	
May	Gigi Hadid	Helena Christensen	
June	Pamela Anderson	Dan Beleiu	
July	Zuzana Čaputová	Ivan Pinkava	
August	Ester Ledecká, Tereza Maxová	Bryan Adams	
September	Grace Bol	Dan Beleiu	
September	Giedrė Dukauskaitė	Michal Pudelka	
September	Georgia May Jagger	Vince M. Aung	
October	Helena Christensen	Pauline Suzor	
November	Vera Amores	Guillaume Roemaet	
November	Finn Buchanan	Alice Rosati	
November	Hanne Gaby Odiele	Dan Beleiu	
December	Charlotte Gainsbourg	Anton Corbijn	
December	Uncredited group of models	Branislav Šimončík, Kaduri Elyashar	

== 2020s ==
=== 2020 ===
Issue	Cover model	Photographer	Ref.
January	Petra Němcová	Branislav Šimončík	
February	Carla Bruni	Cameron Postforoosh	
February	Carolyn Murphy	Guillaume Roemaet	
March	Karlie Kloss	Michal Pudelka	
April	Hana Jiříčková	Claire Rothstein	
April	Guinevere van Seenus	Guinevere van Seenus	
May/June	Marianne Schröder, Tristan Ridel	Jan Kralicek	
May/June	Klára Trombíková	Daniela & Linda Dostálková	
July/August	Eva Herzigová	Laura Sciacovelli	
July/August	Kylie Jenner, Stormi	Morelli Brothers	
September	Cynthia Nixon	Cameron Postforoosh	
September	Barbora Podzimková, Eva Klímková, Antonie Šteflová, Barbora Brusková, Linda Novotná, Frederikra Krenzeloková	Michal Pudelka	
October	Lineisy Montero	Nagi Sakai	
October	Dara Rolins	Lucian Bor	
November	Irina Shayk	Morelli Brothers	
November	Zsofia Varju	Luca Campi	
December	Małgosia Bela	Marcin Kempinski	
December	Prince Nikolai of Denmark	Marco van Rijt	

=== 2021 ===
Issue	Cover model	Photographer/Artist	Ref.
January/February	Juliane Grüner	Florian & Sebastian	
January/February	Sasha Luss	Lucian Bor	
March	Michéle Lamy	Marcin Kempski	
March	Anja Rubik	Marcin Kempski	
March	Kateřina Šimáčková	Magda Wunsche, Aga Samsel	
April	Ruth Bell	Cameron Postforoosh	
April	Élise Crombez	Zeb Deamen	
April	Alpha Dia	Branislav Šimončík	
May	Lara Mullen	Ben Parks	
May	Pavlína Pořízková	Marie Tomanová	
June	Lily McMenamy	Ladislav Kyllar	
June	Blanca Padilla	Lucian Bor	
July/August	Paris Hilton	Cameron Postforoosh	
July/August	Klara Kristin	Branislav Šimončík	
July/August	Ondra Vacek	Branislav Šimončík	
September	—N/a	Milan Houser	
October	Karolína Kurková	Marcus Cooper	
November	Simona Kust	Arseny Jabiev	
December	Rosamund Pike	Laura Sciacovelli	

=== 2022 ===
Issue	Cover model	Photographer/Artist	Ref.
January	Shalom Harlow	Cameron Postforoosh	
February	Barbora Velebová, Omal, Evelyn Vámoš, Anna Markova, Burian Martin	Arseny Jabiev	
February	Uncredited, Richard Richii, Zuzana Kusá, Katherine Ejindu Nsi Ejindu	Arseny Jabiev	
February	Uncredited, uncredited, uncredited, uncredited	Arseny Jabiev	
February	Nicol, Belzi, uncredited, Calum Williams, Silvia Kadlicová	Arseny Jabiev	
March	Lara Stone	Sonia Szóstak	
April	Hana Jiříčková	Branislav Šimončík	
April	Irina Lazareanu	Branislav Šimončík	
April	Erin Wasson	Branislav Šimončík	
May	—N/a	Beka Gvishiani (Style Not Com)	
June	Louise de Chevigny	Arseny Jabiev	
June	Ashley Radjarame	Arseny Jabiev	
July	Julia Fox	Cameron Postforoosh	
July	Dagmar Havlová	Branislav Šimončík	
August	Hugo Fulton	Hendrik Schneider	
August	Kim Peers	Zeb Daeman	
August	Daria Strokous	Ben Lamberty	
August	Yzomandias	Branislav Šimončík	
September	Fernando Casablancas	Branislav Šimončík	
September	Emily Kasten	Ladislav Kyllar	
September	Emily Krause	Tereza Mundilová	
September	Nyagua Ruea	Marek Micanek	
September	Adriana Sklenaříková	Branislav Šimončík	
October	Gabbriette	Ben Lamberty	
October	Gwen Stefani	The Morelli Brothers	
October	—N/a	Tono Stano	
November	Lola Nicon	Damien Krisl	
November	Majda John Peter	Arseny Jabiev	
December	Adhel Bol	Koto Bolofo	
December	Karolína Kurková	Agata Serge	
December	Maggie Maurer	Koto Bolofo	
December	Kim Schell	Abdull Artuev	

=== 2023 ===
Issue	Cover model	Photographer	Ref.
January	Bente Oort	Florian and Sebastian	
January	Ismael Savane	Florian and Sebastian	
January	Teo Bates	Florian and Sebastian	
February	Carmen Kass	Claire Rothstein	
March	Maty Drazek	Abdullah Artuev	
April	Daphne Groeneveld	Donari Braxton	
April	Carmen Dell'Orefice	Albert Watson	
May	Debra Shaw	Freddy Persson	
June	Luna Bijl	Arran & Jules	
July	Dita Von Teese	The Morelli Brothers	
July	Diana Agron	Marie Tomanova	
July	Marie Tomanova	Marie Tomanova	
July	Fan Bingbing	Dalong Yang	
August	Elle Macpherson	Branislav Šimončík	
September	Abbey Lee	The Morelli Brothers	
September	Amanda Murphy	Ina Lekiewicz Levy	
September	Alyda Grace	Marek Micanek	
October	Emily Driver	Jan Grombirik	
October	Michaela Kocianova	Lousy Auber	
October	Karolina Capkova	Jan Grombirik	
November	Giselle Norman	Ina Lekiewicz Levy	
December	Daniela Kocianova	Hana Knizova	

=== 2024 ===
Issue	Cover model	Photographer	Ref.
January	Alessandra Ambrosio	The Morelli Brothers	
February	Celeste Fitzpatrick; Michaela Hlaváčková	Petros	
March	Monica Bellucci	Paolo Roversi	
March	Nyakong Chan	Marek Mičánek	
April	Dalton DuBois	Cameron Postforoosh	
May	Krystyna Pyszková	Jan Grombirik	
May	Jasroop Kaur Singh, Pam Lucas	Hana Knížová	
June	Fernando Lindez	Arseny Jabiev	
June	Filip Hrivnak, Luna Passos	Benedikt Renc	
July	Ashley Graham	Luka Booth	
August	Tereza Petržilková, Vendy Dušková, Josef Dostal	Nicolas Schnabel	
September	Gwendoline Christie	Szilveszter Makó	
September	Steinberg	Pablo Saez	
October	Nathy Peluso	Florian & Sebastian	
October	Delilah Belle, uncredited	Morelli Brothers	
October	Róisín Murphy	Coni Tarallo	
November	Hannah Motler	Betina du Toit	
November	Sonya Mohova	Marek Micanek	
December	Rosie Huntington-Whiteley	Kulesza & Pik	

=== 2025 ===
Issue	Cover model	Photographer	Ref.
January	Maria Bakalova	The Morelli Brothers	
January	Consuelo Vanderbilt Costin	Cameron Postforoosh	
January	Evie Saunders	Alice Rosati	
February	Camille Chifflot, Athiec Geng, Roxane Marie, Léandre, Cade, Femi, Jules, Antonin Pareau, Matteo Mason, Côme, Glory	Pablo Saez	
March	Milla Jovovich	Zoey Grossman	
March	Louise Robert	Olga Sokal	
April	Tereza Ramba	Marie Tomanova	
May	Lindsay Lohan	The Morelli Brothers	
May	Bess van Noord	Alice Rosati	
June	Michelle Laff, Kobe Boateng, Tony Boysen, Milan Dubiel, Aaron Brandt, Jun Lai	Magnus Lechner	
June	Joe Locke	Kosmas Pavlos	
June	Karel Roden	Matúš Tóth	
July	Bibi Abdulkadir	Luka Booth	
July	Vilma Sjöberg	Marie Tomanová	
August	Vanessa Kirby	Rachell Smith	
August	Valery Kaufman	Nima Benati	
August	Arina Maksimova	Cameron Postforoosh	
September	Alys Lutrell-Hunt, Linda Novotna, Deannah Abrams	Michal Pudelka	
September	Alys Lutrell-Hunt, Deannah Abrams, Dexter Franc	Michal Pudelka	
September	Aylah Peterson	Bohdán Bohdánov	
September	Maggie Maurer	Hana Knízova	
October	Elsa Hosk	Carly Dame	
October	Hana Soukupová	Olga Sokal	
October	Brooke Candy	Joaquin Castillo	
October	Calin	Jingxiong Qiao	
November	Xie Chaoyu	Han Yang	
November	Sevdaliza	Colin Solal Cardo	
December	Daniela Peštová	Bohdán Bohdánov	
December	Alexa Chung	Melanie Rodriguez	
December	Ama Okolo, Farida Ebene	Michal Pudelka	

=== 2026 ===
Issue	Cover model	Photographer	Ref.
January	Hana Janata	Ina Lekiewicz Levy	
January	Taylor Hill	Jesús Isnard	
February	Olivia Vinten	Carly Dame	
February	Emma Chamberlain	CG Watkins	
March	Erin O’Connor	Michal Pudelka	
March	Perus Adolwi	Jan Grombirik	
April	Lauren Theobald	Alice Rosati	
April	Vialina Lemann	Kapturing	
May	Karolína Kurková	Simon Elmalem	
June	Paul Anthony Kelly	The Morelli Brothers	
July	Georgina Grenville	Pepe Herreros	
July	Lykke Li	Hana Knížová	
August	Kim Petras	Arseny Jabiev	
September	Adéla	Michal Pudelka	
September	Olivia Petronella Palermo	Bohdán Bohdánov	
October	Helena Christensen	Hana Knizova	
November	Lily McMenamy	Lala Serrano	
November	Hana Soukupová	Bohdán Bohdánov	
December	Sara Blomqvist	Giuseppe Vaccaro	
December	Iva Janžurovou	Veronika Čechmánková	
December	Valery Kaufman	Bohdán Bohdánov	
