= List of Vogue Polska cover models =

This list of Vogue Polska cover models is a catalog of cover models who have appeared on the cover of Vogue Polska, the Polish edition of Vogue magazine, starting with the magazine's first issue in March 2018.

== 2010s ==
=== 2018 ===
Issue	Cover model	Photographer
March	Małgosia Bela and Anja Rubik	Juergen Teller
April	Eva Herzigová	Chris Colls
May	Natalia Vodianova	Christian MacDonald
June	Adwoa Aboah	Tim Walker
July/August	Kasia Smutniak	Stanisław Boniecki
September	Christy Turlington	Chris Colls
October	Jac Jagaciak with Polonia Polish Folk & Dance Ensemble Of Chicago	Zuza Krajewska
November	Anja Rubik	Kacper Kasprzyk
December	Edie Campbell	Felix Cooper

=== 2019 ===
Issue	Cover model	Photographer
January	Magdalena Cielecka	Alexander Saladrigas
February	Joanna Kulig	Max Vadukul
March	Małgosia Bela	Tim Hill & James Aubrey Finnigan
April	Kasia Struss and Ola Rudnicka	Ellen von Unwerth
May	Charlotte Gainsbourg	Juergen Teller
June	Doutzen Kroes	Daniel Jackson
July/August	Edita Vilkevičiūtė	Chris Colls
September	Luna Bijl	Sonia Szóstak
October	Marte Mei van Haaster	Katja Rahlwes
November	Ewa Witkowska; Maria Zakrzewska; Kamila Szczawińska	Mary McCartney
December	Victoria Beckham	Alexi Lubomirski

== 2020s ==
=== 2020 ===
Issue	Cover model	Photographer
January	Patrycja Piekarska	Marcin Kempski
February	Julia Banaś	David Ferrura
March	Lady Jean Campbell	Maciek Kobielski
April	Julia van Os	Stanislaw Boniecki
May/June	Jac Jagaciak	Zuza Krajewska
July/August	Alexandra Agoston	Chris Colls
September	Bianka Nwolisa	Marcin Kempski
October/November	Magdalena Boczarska	Stanislav Boniecki
December	Anja Rubik	Anja Rubik

=== 2021 ===
Issue	Cover model	Photographer
January/February	Birgit Kos	Sonia Szostak
March	Paloma Elsseser	Chris Colls
April/May	Constance Jablonski	Bronislav Simoncik
June	Ola Rudnicka	Jakub Ryniewicz
July/August	Małgosia Bela	Magda Wunsche
September	Maja Zimnoch	Andrew Jacobs
October	Jane Fonda	Molly Matalon
October	Andie MacDowell	Daria Ritch
October	Sandra Drzymalska	Dudi Hasson
November	Flo Hutchings, Sienna King, Wang Han, Lily Nova, and Ngozi Anene	Erdem Moralıoğlu
December	Giedrė Dukauskaitė	Ina Lekiewicz Levy

=== 2022 ===
Issue	Cover model	Photographer
January/February	Julia Hafstrom	Hill & Aubrey
March	Lara Stone	Ina Lekiewicz Levy
April	Illustration by Yelena Yemchuk	
April	Illustration by Małgorzata Mirgatas	
May	Marie-Agnès Diène	Chloé Le Drezen
May	Viktoria Lulko	Chloé Le Drezen
May	Maaike Klaasen	Chloé Le Drezen
June	Julia Sobczyńska and Judyta Milczek	Stefan Heinrichs
June	Kacper Godlewski and Dominik Rosiński	Stefan Heinrichs
July/August	Lindsey Wixson-Young	Arianna Lago
September	Luca Gajdus	Jo Metson Scott
October	Dorota Masłowska	Laura Bailey
October	Mata	Luke Abby
November	Cindy Crawford	Paola Kudacki
December	Shalom Harlow	Stuart Winecoff

=== 2023 ===
Issue	Cover model	Photographer
January/February	Róża Czarnecka-Wiącek, Kuba Skała, Julia Kuźniar, Sara Chybalska, Tola Woźnica, Pati Bogusz, Hanna Serwińska, Maja Krajniewska, Yebin Hwang, Magda Kurczewska	Ina Lekiewicz Levy
March	Anja Rubik	Inez & Vinoodh
April	Lina Zhang	David Abrahams
May	Paola Manes, Nando Autiero	Dudi Hasson
June	Grace and Cassady Clover	Melanie Rodriguez
July/August	AI generated image of three lookalike female models	Nicola Bergamaschi & Mateusz Grzelak
September	Suvi Maria Riggs	Tina Tyrell
September	Cara Taylor	Tina Tyrell
October	Małgosia Bela	Wunsche & Samsel
October	Vito Bambino	Valentin Hennequin
November	Małgorzata Szumowska	Akila Berjaoui
December	Alek Wek	Erdem Moralioğlu

=== 2024 ===
Issue	Cover model	Photographer
January/February	Julia Banaś	Ina Lekiewicz Levy
March	Merlijne Schorren	Johan Sandberg
April	Sylke Golding	Alix Murat
April	Gemma Ward	Virginie Khateeb
May	Mirthe Dijk	Olivier Kervern
June	Diana Skowron, Madelief Bouter, Magda Rychard	Fanny Latour-Lambert
June	Martina Boaretto Giuliano	Bea De Giacomo
July/August	Sanah	Simon Elmalem
July/August	Dawid Podsiadło	Marcin Kempski
September	Lainey Hearn	Jeff Boudreau
September	Maggie Maurer	Nicolas Kern
October	Julie Hoomans	Kulesza & Pik
November	Nyaueth Riam & Athiec Geng	Karolina Pukowiec
November	Aivita Muze	Tatiana & Karol
December	Annabel Van Tilborg	Ina Lekiewicz Levy

=== 2025 ===
Issue	Cover model	Photographer
January/February	Lydia Angel	Fanny Latour-Lambert
March	Nora Svenson	Hein Gijsbers
March	Gemma Janes	Tom Craig
April	Krini Hernandez	Hill & Aubrey
April	Xiuli Jiang	Kulesza & Pik
May	Karolina Rzepa	Yan Wasiuchnik
May	Tida Rosvall	Anne Lai
June	Dalton Dubois	Melanie Rodriguez
June	Alin Szewczyk	Maksym Rudnik
July/August	Vivien Solari	Ina Lekiewicz Levy
July/August	Ewa Pajor	Sandra Mickiewicz
September	Claudia Campana	Bohdán Bohdánov
September	Bambi	Lola Banet
October	Gillian Anderson	Alexi Lubomirski
October	Magdalena Boczarska	Janek Wasiuchnik
October	Grażyna Torbicka	Janek Wasiuchnik
November	Greta Hofer	Ina Lekiewicz Levy
November	Hania Rani	Toby Coulson
December	Olga Lane	Fanny Latour-Lambert
December	Nadine Kirilova	Stanisław Boniecki

=== 2026 ===
Issue	Cover model	Photographer
January/February	Estelle Nehring	Karolina Pukowiec
March	Loo Loo Bark, Viktorija Bauzyte	Antonino Cafiero
March	Anda Rottenberg	Olga Sokal
April	Angelika Wierzbicka	Antonino Cafiero
April	Patrycja Piekarska	Melaine Rodriguez
May	Paula Anguera	Arianna Lago
June	Lydia Reid	Antoine Henault
July/August	Maja Chwalińska	Karolina Pukowiec
September	Karen Elson	Erdem Moralıoğlu
October	Fran Summers	David Abrahams
November	Greta Bellamacina	Melanie Rodriguez
November	Sara Grace Wallerstedt	Arianna Lago

== See also ==
- List of Harper's Bazaar Polska cover models
