= List of Harper's Bazaar Polska cover models =

This list of Harper's Bazaar Polska cover models (2013–2019; 2026–present) is a catalog of cover models who have appeared on the cover of Harper's Bazaar Polska, the Polish edition of American fashion magazine Harper's Bazaar.

== 2010s ==
=== 2013 ===
Issue	Cover model	Photographer
March	Małgosia Bela	Koray Birand
April	Anne Hathaway	David Slijper
May	Monica Bellucci	Signe Vilstrup
June	Gwyneth Paltrow	Daniel Jackson
July/August	Christy Turlington	Daniel Jackson
September	Olivia Wilde	Pavel Havlicek
October	Joanna Kulig	Piotr Stoklosa
November	Edyta Bartosiewicz	Marcin Kempski
December	Madonna	Terry Richardson

=== 2014 ===
Issue	Cover model	Photographer
January/February	Kasia Smutniak	Nico Bustos
March	Rosie Huntington-Whiteley	Karl Lagerfeld
April	Magdalena Frackowiak	Gianluca Fontana
May	Nicole Kidman	James White
June	Kate Moss	Terry Richardson
July/August	Miranda Kerr	Alexi Lubomirski
September	Lara Stone	Sebastian Faena
October	Charlize Theron	Nico Bustos
November	Elisa Sednaoui	Nico Bustos
December	Anne Hathaway	Alexi Lubomirski

=== 2015 ===
Issue	Cover model	Photographer
January/February	Alessandra Ambrosio	Simon Upton
March	Anna Jagodzińska	Marcin Tyszka
April	Kate Winslet	Alexi Lubomirski
May	Ola Rudnicka; Magdalena Jasek; Maja Salamon	Elisabeth Toll
June	Anja Rubik	Nico Bustos
July/August	Anna Ewers	Norman Jean Roy
September	Katy Perry	Jean-Paul Goude
October	Zuzanna Bijoch	Jens Langkjaer
November	Michelle Dockery	David Slijper
December	Gabriella Wilde	Felix Cooper

=== 2016 ===
Issue	Cover model	Photographer
January/February	Kate Upton	Victor Demarchelier
March	Cate Blanchett	Norman Jean Roy
April	Kasia Struss	Kevin Sinclair
May	Jennifer Lawrence	Mario Sorrenti
June	Alicja Bachleda-Curuś	Koray Birand
July/August	Daria Werbowy	Nico Bustos
September	Kanye West; Kim Kardashian	Karl Lagerfeld
October	Monika Brodka	Zuza Krajewska
November	Kasia Sokołowska	Zuza Krajewska
December	Gwyneth Paltrow	Alexi Lubomirski

=== 2017 ===
Issue	Cover model	Photographer
January/February	Keira Knightley	Alexi Lubomirski
March	Coco Rocha	Zhang Jingna
April	Kasia Jujeczka; Maja Salamon	Sonia Szóstak
May	Magdalena Frackowiak	Olivia Malone
June	Magdalena Cielecka	Zuza Krajewska
July/August	Kendall Jenner	Camilla Åkrans
September	Adriana Lima; The Weeknd; Irina Shayk	Brigitte Lacombe
October	Sam Rollinson	Marcin Tyszka
November	Zofia Wichłacz	Zuza Krajewska
December	Julia Roberts	Alexi Lubomirski

=== 2018 ===
Issue	Cover model	Photographer
January/February	Angelina Jolie	Alexi Lubomirski
March	Małgorzata Szumowska; Małgorzata Gorol	Zuza Krajewska
April	Anna Jagodzińska	Sergi Pons
May	Karolina Gruszka	Zuza Krajewska
June	Magdalena Jasek	Magdalena Luniewska
July/August	Morgane Polanski	Ina Lekiewicz
September	Paris Jackson	Mario Sorrenti
October	Alicja Tubilewicz	Ina Lekiewicz
November	Mela Koteluk	Adam Plu
December	Agnieszka Żulewska	Kulesza & Pik

=== 2019 ===
Issue	Cover model	Photographer
January/February	Michelle Gutknecht	Adam Plu
March	Mary Komasa	Max vom Hofe
April	Saoirse Ronan	Erik Madigan Heck
May	Natalia Siodmiak	Gosia Turczyńska
June	Georgia May Jagger	Ina Lekiewicz
July/August	Maja Ostaszewska	Adam Plu
September	Kate Moss	Mario Sorrenti
October	Blanca Padilla	Paul Bellaart
November	Zuzanna Bijoch	Kulesza & Pik
December	Agnieszka Grochowska	Kulesza & Pik

== 2020s ==
=== 2026 ===
Issue	Cover model	Photographer
September	Tilda Swinton	Johnnie Shand Kydd
October	Kamila Urzędowska	Branislav Šimončík
November	Natalie Portman	Carlijn Jacobs

== See also ==
- List of Vogue Polska cover models
