= Bienert =

Bienert is a surname. Notable people with the surname include:

- Gerhard Bienert (1898–1986), German actor
- Patrick Bienert (born 1980), German photographer
- Richard Bienert (1881–1949), Czech police officer and politician
- Theophil Joachim Heinrich Bienert (1833–1873), German botanist
