= Pacuła =

Pacuła [paˈt͡suwa] is a Polish surname. Notable people with this surname include:

- Ewa Pacuła (born 1971), Polish model and television personality
- Ireneusz Pacula (born 1966), Polish ice hockey player
- Joanna Pacuła (born 1957), Polish-American actress and model
- Tadeusz Pacuła (1932–1984), Polish basketball player
