= Ashley Radjarame =

French fashion model of Indian heritage

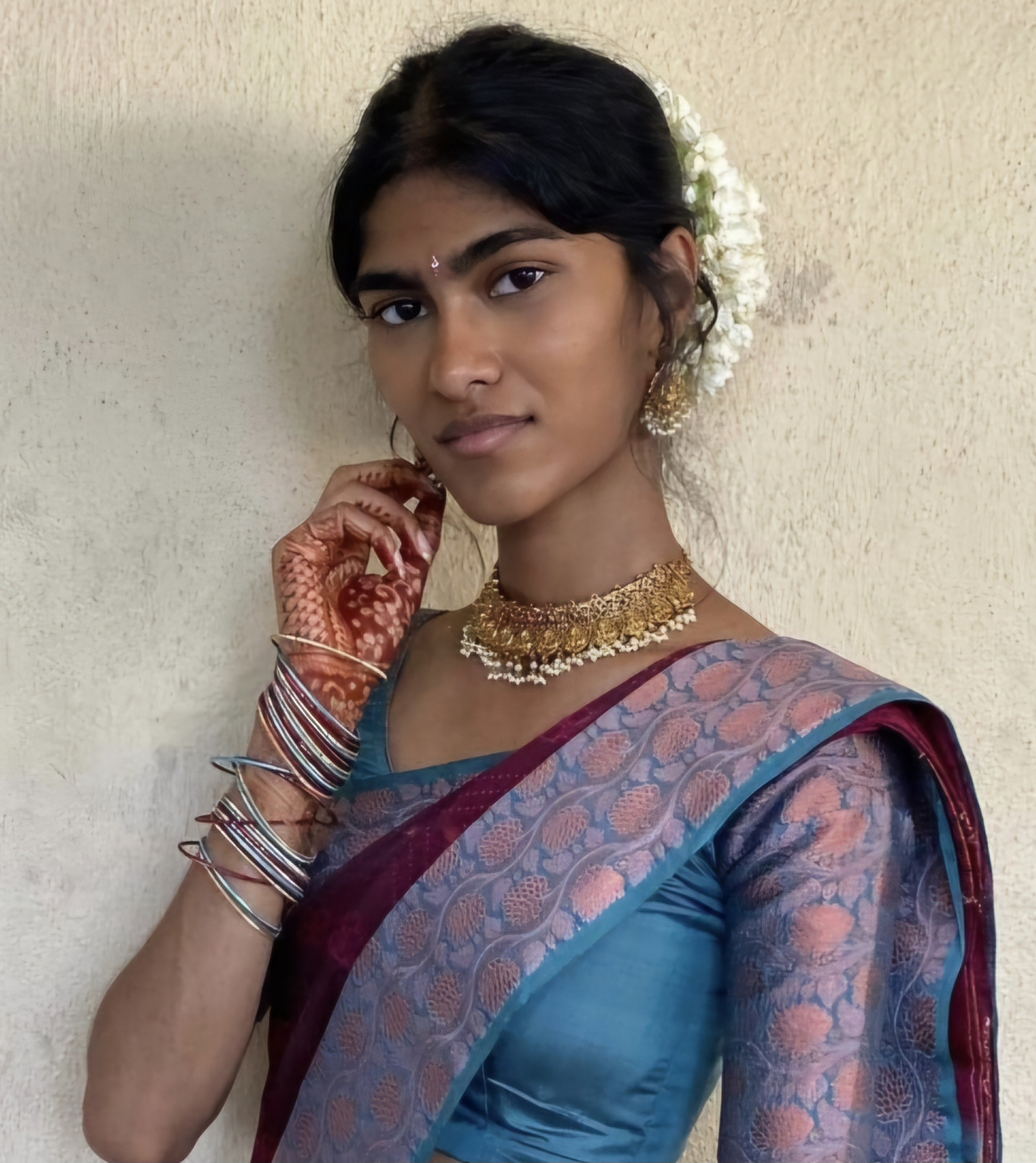
- Born: 1999 (age 26–27); Île-de-France, France
- Modelling information
- Height: 1.72 m (5 ft 7 1/2 in)
- Hair colour: Black
- Eye colour: Brown
- Agency: IMG Models (New York, Paris, Milan, London)

Ashley Radjarame (born 1999) is a French fashion model of Tamil Indian heritage. Scouted in London in 2019, she made her runway debut as an exclusive for Prada and was named one of Vogue's "Top 15 models" of the spring 2020 season. She has appeared on the covers of Vogue India, Vogue Ukraine, Vogue Czechoslovakia, and Vogue Polska, and is ranked among the industry's "Top 50" models by models.com.

== Early life ==
Radjarame was born in the Parisian suburb of Rueil-Malmaison to Tamil parents originally from Puducherry. Her maternal grandfather served in the French military, and her mother inherited French citizenship through him, moving to France at the age of 25; the whole family later settled there.

She experienced harassment from her peers in her youth over her ethnicity and her body. She has a younger sister. She has described herself as religious, and reads books on Hinduism.

== Career ==
Radjarame was scouted by casting director Mollie Dendle while vintage shopping on Brick Lane in London, where she was studying international business trade in a coffee shop. Less than a week later, she signed with IMG Models. Her first modelling job was the Prada Resort 2020 campaign, and she made her runway debut as an exclusive in the house's spring/summer 2020 show in 2019. Upon her debut, Vogue chose her as one of the "Top 15 models" of the spring 2020 season. She walked for Louis Vuitton's show that season, which took place at the Louvre. She has also walked the runway for Lanvin, Rabanne, Stella McCartney, Jacquemus, and Acne Studios, and is ranked as one of the "Top 50" models in the industry by models.com. Her advertising campaigns have included Mango, Fendi, Chanel Beauty, Louis Vuitton, and Supriya Lele, as well as Prada, Ferragamo, Jacquemus, Isabel Marant, and Sacai.

Radjarame's covers include the September 2021 issue of Vogue India, the November 2021 issue of Vogue Ukraine, the June 2022 issue of Vogue Czechoslovakia, and a digital cover for Vogue Polska in December 2022. Her October 2022 Vogue India cover was photographed in Puducherry in her family's hometown. She has since covered Marie Claire France (October 2025), Vogue Portugal (December 2025), and the spring/summer 2026 issue of Numéro Netherlands.

Models.com nominated her for Breakout Star in 2020 and for Model of the Year in 2021. In January 2026, she walked in the fall/winter 2026 shows of Toteme and Willy Chavarria. She has called for the industry to scout more South Asian models, and has said she wants to educate her community about colourism.

== Personal life ==
Radjarame returns to Puducherry every year to holiday with her family.
