= Anda Rottenberg =

Polish art historian and writer (born 1944)

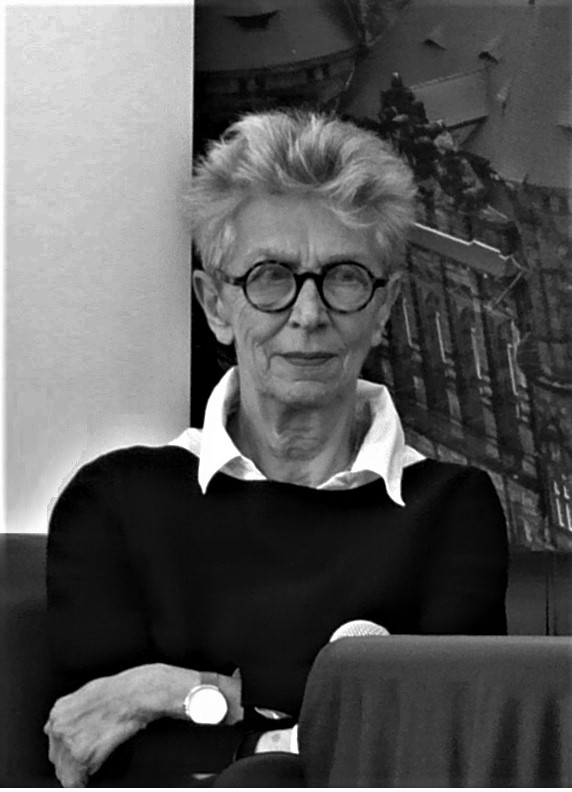
- Rottenberg in 2020
- Born: 23 April 1944 (age 82); Novosibirsk, Russian SFSR, Soviet Union
- Occupations: Art historian, writer
- Years active: 1963-present
- Notable work: Sztuka w Polsce 1945-2005 (en. "Art in Poland 1945-2005"), Proszę bardzo! (en. "You're welcome!")

Anda Rottenberg (born 23 April 1944) is a Polish art historian, art curator, art critic, and writer recognized for her contributions to recognizing Poland's art world. She is former director of the Zachęta National Gallery of Art in Warsaw and member of the International Association of Art Critics (AICA), International "Manifesta" Foundation and the International "Germinations" Foundation. She launched Egit, one of the first foundations for art in Poland, served as Director of the Department of Art at the Ministry of Culture and Art, was curator and commissioner of the Polish Pavilion in the Venice Biennial from 1973-2001, and was instrumental in establishing the Museum of Modern Art in Warsaw. Also, Rottenberg serves as the culture director at Vogue Polska.

== Biography ==
Anda Rottenberg was born in 1944. Her mother was Russian from Petersburg, and her father was a Polish Jew from the town of Nowy Sącz. All of his family was murdered during the Holocaust.

Rottenberg grew up in Legnica. In 1963, she moved to Warsaw, where she earned a degree in the history of art at the University of Warsaw.

She wrote the following books: Sztuka w Polsce 1945-2005 (en. "Art in Poland 1945-2005"), Draught - Texts on Polish Art of the ‘80s (2009), Here You Are (2009), and an autobiography Proszę bardzo! (en. "You're welcome!"). The main reason for writing the latter book was her anger at the police who were unable to find the body of her son (he was a drug addict and died in unknown circumstances). In her autobiography, Rottenberg also wrote about her mother, who survived the siege of Stalingrad [?] during World War II and was sentenced to prison for stealing a few spoons of food: she met there her future husband, Rottenberg's father.

Anda Rottenberg received the Officer's Cross Order of Polonia Restituta (2001), the Commander's Cross Order of Polonia Restituta (2011), Aleksander Gieysztor Prize (2013), and Medal for Merit to Culture – Gloria Artis (2014).

== Career ==
Anda Rottenberg is a Warsaw-based curator and writer. She established Egit in 1986, one of the earliest art foundations in Poland. She was Director of the Department of Art within the Ministry of Culture and Art in 1991-1992, Director of Mazowiecka Gallery in Warsaw from 1991-1993, and Director of the George Soros Center for Contemporary Art 1992-1993. She was Director of the National Gallery of Art, Zachęta, in Warsaw from 1993-2001 and orchestrated exhibitions featuring Polish artists on an international stage, with presentations in Venice and São Paulo Biennials.

Rottenberg was instrumental in establishing the Museum of Modern Art in Warsaw in 2005.
