= Paulina Tomborowska =

Polish model and television journalist

- Born: 1975 (age 50–51); Warsaw, Poland
- Modeling information
- Height: 168 cm (5 ft 6 in)
- Hair color: blonde
- Eye color: blue
- Agency: Model Plus: Warsaw Image Models: Tokyo Why Not Model Agency: Milan

Paulina Tomborowska (born 1975) is a Polish model and Polish TV journalist (Polsat Café).

She began working as a model at age 16 in 1991. Initially, she took part in television commercials and fashion shows, including for Polish fashion designer Anna Brodzinska. In 1995, she signed international contracts in Tokyo and Milan. Her height of 168 centimetres (66 in) was an ideal fit to the Japanese fashion market. For nearly four years, she moved between Warsaw, Tokyo and Milan. At the beginning of 1999, she returned to the Poland and became one of the most successful models in the country, in addition to such Ilona Felicjańska, Ewa Pacuła, Agnieszka Maciąg and Agnieszka Martyna. Since 1999, she appeared in television series and films, such as the series "Czułość i kłamstwa".

For several years, she was a TV presenter. On TV Polsat Cafe co-program "Zoom na miasto" and "Z tyłu sceny".

In later years, she has kept a low public profile, rarely shows up in media interviews.

She is a law graduate at the University of Warsaw.
