= Vivien Solari =

British model (born 1980)

- Born: 26 June 1980 (age 46); Aruba, Kingdom of the Netherlands
- Occupation: Model
- Years active: 1999–2006; 2013–present
- Modelling information
- Height: 174 cm (5 ft 9 in)
- Hair colour: Brown
- Eye colour: Blue
- Agencies: D' Management Group (Milan); IMG Models (New York City); IMG Models (Paris); Tess (London); Unique Models (Copenhagen)

Vivien Solari (born 26 June 1980) is a British model.

== Early life ==
Solari was born in 1980 on the Caribbean island of Aruba and was raised in Manchester.

== Career ==
Solari was 19 years old and studying psychology at the University of Leicester when she was scouted. She was then featured in Versace fragrance campaign and a Vogue Italia editorial, by the early 2000s was one of the top earning British models (behind Naomi Campbell and ahead of Kate Moss).

She took a break from her career in 2006 to focus on her family and returned to modelling in 2013.

Solari has been featured on the cover of Amica, D La Repubblica, Elle, Elle Italia, Harper's & Queen, Harper's Bazaar España, L'Officiel Paris, M Le Magazine du Monde, Marie Claire Italia, Numéro, Numéro Tokyo, Russh, British Vogue, Vogue Australia, Vogue Deutsch (Beauty), Vogue España, Vogue Paris, Vogue Polska, Vogue Türkiye, Vogue Ukraine. In advertising campaigns for Alexander McQueen, Bottega Veneta, Burberry, Christian Dior, Esprit, Gap, Genny, Hermès, Issey Miyake, Jil Sander, Missoni, Sportmax, Uniqlo, Vera Wang. Solari has also walked runways for Acne Studios, Ann Demeulemeester, Blumarine, Calvin Klein, Chanel, Chloé, Christian Lacroix, Diane von Furstenberg, Dries van Noten, Emanuel Ungaro, Fendi, Helmut Lang, Hussein Chalayan, Isabel Marant, John Galliano, Kenzo, Louis Vuitton, Revillon, Salvatore Ferragamo, Trussardi, Vivienne Westwood, and more.

== Personal life ==
Solari has three children. In 2020 she began reducing her carbon footprint when on modelling assignments. She is also an advocate for outdoor swimming and swims every morning.
