= Dorit Revelis =

Israeli fashion model

- דורית רבליס
- Born: Dorit Miriam Revelis; December 9, 2001 (age 24); Ashdod, Israel
- Occupation: Model
- Years active: 2016–present
- Modeling information
- Height: 5 ft 9.5 in (1.77 m)
- Hair color: Blonde
- Eye color: Green
- Agency: R&R by Roberto and Rotem (Israel); Robert (Italy); DNA Model Management (US); VIVA Model Management (Paris)

Dorit Miriam Revelis (Hebrew: דורית מרים רבליס; born December 9, 2001) is an Israeli fashion model.

Known for her distinctive curly hair, she has led many international modelling campaigns, including the global advertising campaigns for Ralph Lauren Polo, Topshop, Calvin Klein, Sonia Rykiel, Urban Outfitters, Chanel, Claudie Pierlot and Massimo Dutti, She has appeared in magazines such as British Vogue, Vogue Italia and Vogue Ukraine, while walking for Lacoste, Miu Miu and Off-White.

== Early life ==
Revelis was born and raised in Ashdod to a Jewish family. Her father Vadim Vladimir Revelis immigrated to Israel from the Caucasus in Russia, and her mother Zoya Shafir from Ukraine. She majored in math and physics at highschool, and plays classical piano. Revelis is also an awarded athlete in rhythmic gymnastics and track and field.

She was enlisted to the Israel Defense Forces in 2020.

== Career ==
External image
- Dorit Revelis for Off-White

She first became a popular with photographers due to her curly hair, and her resemblance to fellow Israeli model Michaela Bercu. In 2016, she was signed in an exclusive contract to lead campaigns for Yves Saint Laurent, however, the contract was blocked by French law due to her being under 16 years old at the time. In 2017, Revelis was chosen to open Dior's Haute couture show for S/S 2017, after the Italian Renaissance theme of the show had been partly designed around her. However, this was cancelled as they believed she may look too young.

She broke out in 2017, taking part in many international modelling campaigns, including the global advertising campaigns for Ralph Lauren, where she worked alongside fellow Israeli model Sofia Mechetner. She also led campaigns for Topshop, Calvin Klein, Sonia Rykiel, Urban Outfitters, Chanel, Claudie Pierlot, Miu Miu, Massimo Dutti. She was covermodel for Russh, alongside fellow Israeli model Sofia Mechetner.

In 2018, she was signed by Zara to lead its 2018 campaigns. She was also chosen to lead the global campaign for H&M for 2018.

As of 2020, she leads the campaign of Israeli fashion brand Castro.

== Personal life ==
She began dating Israeli actor Daniel Peretz in 2022, and they reside together in Tel Aviv.
