= Marie Tomanova =

Czech photographer (born 1984)

- Marie Tomanová
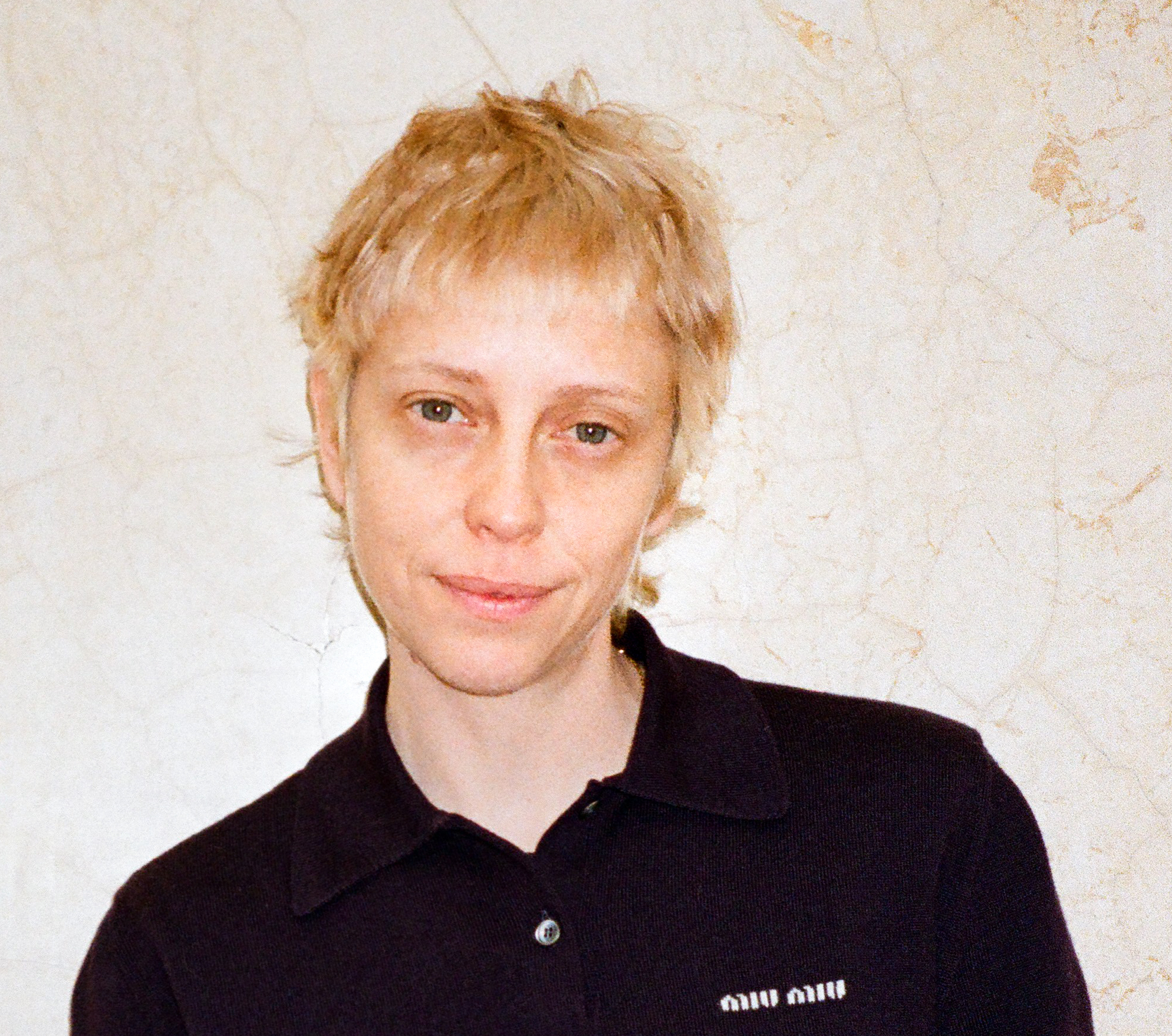
- Born: 1984 (age 41–42); Valtice, Czech Republic
- Occupations: artist, photographer
- Years active: 2016–present
- Website: marietomanova.com

Marie Tomanova (also known as Marie Tomanová, born 1984) is a Czech-born New York City–based artist. Her work focuses primarily on issues of identity and displacement. She first came to international attention with her first book, Young American, which celebrates individuality and youth, particularly in regard to gender, sexuality, and self-expression. Tomanova is the subject of a feature-length documentary film with HBO Europe by director Marie Dvorakova, World Between Us, which premiered at the Ji.hlava International Documentary Film Festival in 2024.

== Early life and education ==
Tomanova was born in Valtice, a village in the South Moravian region of the Czech Republic, near the Austrian border. She grew up in Czechoslovakia, coming of age during the post-Velvet Revolution (1989). Tomanova received an MFA in painting from the Faculty of Fine Arts at Brno University of Technology, Czech Republic (2010).

== Career ==
After receiving her MFA, Tomanova left the Czech Republic in 2011 to work as an au pair in the United States. First in North Carolina, later in New York State. After moving in 2012 to New York City, she found work babysitting, cleaning, and cooking for privileged families. After viewing an exhibition of the work of the photographer Francesa Woodman (1958–1981) at the Guggenheim Museum in 2012, she found her creative outlet in photography, took night classes in photography from Keren Moscovitch at SVA in New York City, and began to photograph herself against the backdrop of the American landscape in an attempt to see and understand herself. Focused on themes of identity and belonging, this body of photographic self-portraiture work established her first series Displacements (2012–2016). Displacements gained the attention of curators working with the theme of feminism and beginning in 2015, Tomanova's work was soon included in numerous group exhibitions with a feminist focus, most notably at A.I.R. Gallery. Since 2016, she has been organising group and solo exhibitions, creating her own photo collections, being a model for prestigious magazines and brands, such as Forbes, Balenciaga and many more.

== Work ==
=== Curation (2016–2018) ===
Beginning in 2016, with her reputation as an artist becoming established, Tomanova embarked on co-curating a series of exhibitions at the Czech Center New York between 2016 and 2018 as part of a new exhibition, Youth Explosion: The New Bohemia, which in addition to her own work included a roster of emerging young, queer-identifying artists such as Bobbi Salvör Menuez, Michael Baily-Gates, and Ethan James Green. In 2017 she co-curated Baby, I Like It Raw: Post-Eastern Bloc Photography and Video, an exhibition that featured the work Slava Mogutin, Sasha Kurmaz, Anya Schiller, Irina Yulieva, as well as Tomanova herself. In 2018, Tomanova co-curated her final exhibition for the Czech Center New York, Muse Muse, for which she invited curators to present the work of artists. Included in this show were photographer Pixy Liao and painter Teresa Chromati.

=== Young American (2016–2019) ===
In 2018, Tomanova had her first solo art exhibition at the Czech Center New York, called Young American. Whereas Tomanova's Displacement series of work sought to allow her to view herself in the American landscape, in a series of portraits of young people with whom she strongly identified, Young American sought to connect her with the social landscape. She developed the Young American exhibition into a book by the same name that garnered international recognition. The Introduction was written by photographer Ryan McGinley.

=== New York New York (2016–2021) ===
Next work New York New York project was first exhibited at Live For The Weather, her 2020 exhibition for the European Month of Photography at the Tschechisches Zentrum Berlin in the fall of 2020. At that exhibition, her largest-to-date, she was approached to do a new book, with much of the work shot during the COVID pandemic. Tomanova's second book, New York New York, published in 2021 by Hatje Cantz with a foreword by musician Kim Gordon, is more significantly a reorientation as Tomanova begins to examine the relationship between people and place, rather than to express a connection to a social landscape. Like Young American, New York New York garnered international acclaim for its raw, straight forward images that celebrated the multiculturalism of New York City from the point of view of a Czech immigrant finding her way to the American dream.

=== It Was Once My Universe (2017–2021) ===
In one way or another, we all leave home and look back with wordless wonder. Thank god there are artists like Marie Tomanova that can encapsulate the ruthless beauty of this rear-view canyon.

— Alec Soth, It Was Once My Universe (Foreword)

In 2017 Tomanova returned to Czech Republic, to Mikulov, where she expects to feel like she has returned home, but instead she feels lost and displaced after so long away. Tomanova writes in an October 5, 2022 interview with Gilda Bruno for The British Journal of Photography, “Everything was new, different, and foreign.” The documentation of the next several weeks of this return home (until January 5, 2018) is the subject of Tomanova's It Was Once My Universe body of photographic work, which she would publish as a book with Tokyo-based publisher Super Labo in 2022. It Was Once My Universe was selected by Berlin-based curator Sonia Voss to be included in the 2021 Louis Roederer Discovery Award exhibition section at the Rencontres d’Arles, Arles, France. It Was Once My Universe was then selected to travel for exhibition at the Jimei x Arles International Photo Festival, Xiamen, China.

=== 5 East Broadway (2023–2024) ===
Between February and May 2023, Marie Tomanova rented a 3.5 by 3.5 meter studio located at 5 East Broadway on the fourth floor of a New York City walk-up building and invited twenty-eight youth to come and tell her their dreams, to dance, to take photographs, and to film. This latest body of work, titled 5 East Broadway, consists of a series of color and black-and-white photographs and two artist films, Beat of My Heart (2023) and 14 Dreamers (I Want to be the Next Courtney Love…Only Better) (2023).

=== Films (2023–present) ===
- Beat of My Heart (2023) (14:35)
- 14 Dreamers (I Want to be the Next Courtney Love…Only Better) (2023) (18:05)

== Personal life ==
Since 2018 she lives with art historian and curator Thomas Beachdel in New York City.

== In culture ==
Documentary film directed by Marie Dvorakova The World Between Us traces five years of Tomanova's artistic and personal life since her first New York City solo art exhibition in 2018, Young American, through multiple international exhibitions and book projects, including Tomanova being featured in the New York Times, and photographing herself for the cover of Vogue CS in June 2022. Film was premiered at the Jihlava International Documentary Film Festival in October 2024.
