= Sofia Mechetner =

Israeli model

Sofia "Sofi" Mechetner סופיה "סופי" מצ'טנר
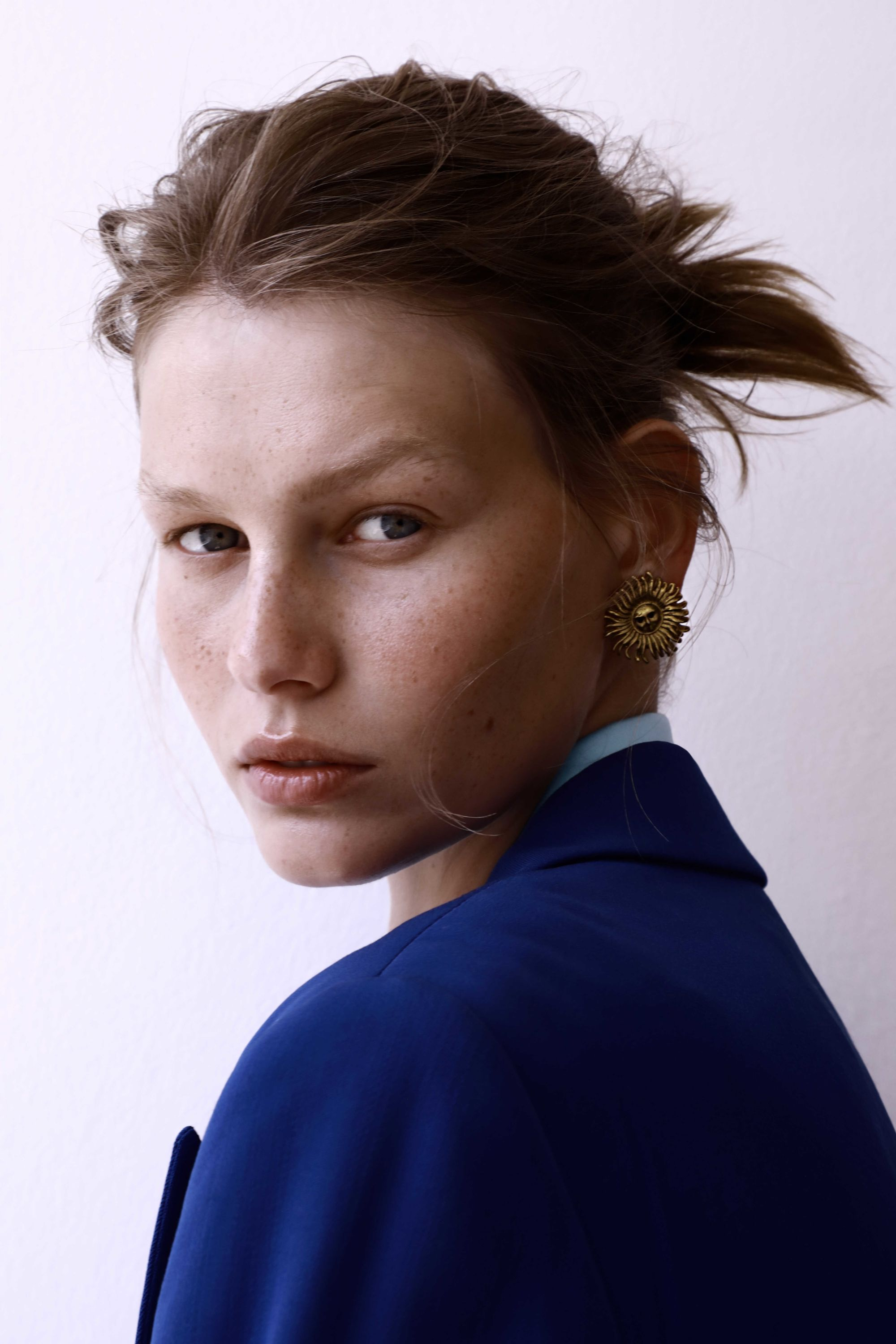
- Mechetner in 2021
- Born: Sofia Mechetner; 4 December 2000 (age 25); Holon, Israel
- Occupation: Model
- Years active: 2015–current
- Modeling information
- Height: 5 ft 11 in (1.80 m)
- Hair color: Blonde
- Eye color: Blue
- Agency: R&R By Roberto & Rotem (Tel Aviv); One Management (New York); VIVA Model Management (Paris)

Sofia "Sofi" Mechetner (Hebrew: סופיה "סופי" מצ'טנר; born 4 December 2000) is an Israeli model and the current face of Dior. In July 2015, at the age 14, she was chosen to be the face of Dior. In her first modelling job, Mechetner opened the Dior Haute Couture Fall Winter 2015/2016 Show at Paris Fashion Week, and in October of the same year she opened the Dior Spring Summer 2016 Show at Paris Fashion Week. Her 1 million Shekel (roughly US$250,000) annual contract with Dior was renewed for a second year in 2016.

In 2017, she signed an additional contract to work for Chanel. In 2017, she walked for Marc Jacobs, Miu Miu, Alexander McQueen, Mugler, Stella McCartney, Sonia Rykiel, Elie Saab, Karl Lagerfeld, Valentino, and H&M, as well as taking part in an international advertising campaign for Ralph Lauren. In 2018, she became lead model for Topshop's F/W 2018 and S/S 2019 international campaigns. In 2019, she led the Tommy Hilfiger S/S campaign.

== Early life ==
Sofia Mechetner was born and raised in Holon, Israel, to parents who immigrated from then Soviet Russia. Her parents Fyodor Sotnikov and Ksenya Mechenter divorced and her father left the family when she was 10.

In April 2019, Mechetner was enlisted to the Israel Defense Forces as a soldier, per mandatory military service, and opted not to move to New York City for more lucrative opportunities at that time. She had an honorable discharge from the IDF in April 2021.

== Career ==
External image
- Sofia Mechetner for Dior

She was chosen to be Dior's leading model after she was spotted by Dior's lead designer Raf Simons in Paris. In her first contract for Dior (her first ever modelling job), she was paid over $265,000, which she shared with her family, saying of her paycheck, "I just put it on the table and they can use it." She plans to use her modelling income to help her mother, who she considers to be her personal hero, saying: “She works so hard for the family. She always supports and takes care of me, my little sister, and my little brother. Together we all try to help so that it will be easier for our mom”.

As part of her contract, she is expected to travel to Paris four times a year for modelling campaigns. But she will continue at school in Israel, saying, “It is very important for me to continue to go to school." While working as a model she will be accompanied by a chaperone from Israel at all times, until she is 18. Her chaperone Rotem Gur makes sure she is accompanied for every moment while working.

She is represented by VIVA Model Management in Paris and Roberto Model Management in Tel-Aviv. In 2015, her story was covered by a documentary on Israel's Channel 2 news, which described her being discovered as a Cinderella story. In February 2016, she won a second contract of NIS 1 million, to lead Dior's 'Ready-to-wear' and international sunglasses campaigns – making her one of Israel's most highly paid models, while her Israeli best friend, model Dorit Revelis who is one year her junior, reportedly won a contract with Yves Saint Laurent. In 2017, the 16 year old model signed an additional contract with Paris fashion brand Chanel.

Despite her career, back in Israel she still helps her mother to clean houses. When not taking part in modelling campaigns, she lives the same life as before she was discovered: "I get up in the morning, help to organize my little sister Nicole (11) and my little brother Max (9), my mother goes to work as a cleaner and I go to school. When I get home from school, I'm sitting under a blanket and watching TV, talking with friends, go to the garden or to someone's house, return and do my homework and go to bed. Once the school principal said hello to me when she saw me in the hallway, but other than that I really feel normal in school, like everyone else." The modelling income has allowed the family to rent a more spacious apartment in her hometown of Holon, Israel.

In 2017, she walked for Marc Jacobs, Miu Miu, Alexander McQueen, Mugler, Stella McCartney, Sonia Rykiel, Elie Saab, Karl Lagerfeld, Valentino, and H&M, as well as taking part in an international advertising campaign for the Ralph Lauren Autumn/Winter campaign. In 2018, she was cover model for Elle France in April, cover model for Telva magazine, cover model for Russh, editorial model in Vogue Espana, walked for Lacoste, and led the international campaign for Marc Jacobs Daisy fragrances alongside Kaia Gerber, she also led the Fall/Winter campaign for Elie Saab signed to take part in an international campaign for H&M, and for Ralph Lauren Polo. In her international campaign for H&M, her image was projected onto New York's Times Square. In 2018, she became lead model for Topshop's F/W 2018 and S/S 2019 campaigns. In 2019, she led the Tommy Jeans S/S campaign.

== Personal life ==
She was in a relationship with Israeli model Tomer Telias from 2017 to 2021. They resided together in Yehud, Israel.

In 2019, Mechetner who as the daughter of non-Jewish mother is not halachically Jewish, said that she undoubtedly will convert to Judaism, stating that, "I feel as Jewish as ever. I light Shabbat candles, and I totally belong to this country [of Israel]."
