= Anna Jagodzińska =

Polish model

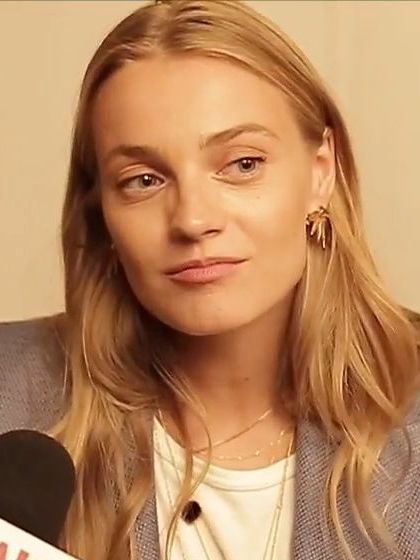
- Jagodzińska in 2018
- Born: Anna Maria Jagodzińska; September 12, 1987 (age 39); Sierpc, Poland
- Years active: 2003–2006, 2008–present
- Modeling information
- Height: 1.77 m (5 ft 9 1/2 in)
- Hair color: Blonde
- Eye color: Blue-Green
- Agency: New York Model Management (New York); Women Management (Paris); Elite Model Management (Milan, London); Uno Models (Barcelona); Scoop Models (Copenhagen); Modelink (Gothenburg); Kult Models (Hamburg); MP Stockholm (Stockholm); Model Plus (Warsaw)

Anna Maria Jagodzińska (born September 12, 1987) is a Polish model. She has appeared on the covers of American, Italian, Australian, Chinese, Portuguese, and German Vogue, L'Officiel, Revue de Modes, and Japanese Numéro. In December 2011, she was ranked #9 among models at the website models.com.

== Life and career ==
Jagodzińska was born September 12, 1987, in Sierpc, Poland. She signed with NEXT Model Management in 2003, and made her runway debut at Pringle of Scotland's Fall 2003 show. Later that year, she moved to New York City. During Spring 2004 fashion weeks (September 2003), she modeled for DKNY and Marc by Marc Jacobs. Her breakthrough year was 2004; she walked for Alexander McQueen, Burberry, Chanel, Marni, and Prada during Fall 2004 fashion weeks. That year, she also appeared in editorials in W, Vogue Italia, and i-D, and modeled in advertisements for BCBG Max Azria, Moschino Cheap & Chic, and Pollini.

In 2005, Jagodzińska appeared on the covers of French Revue de Modes, Australian Vogue, and L'Officiel. She also appeared in a British Vogue editorial. She walked in fashion shows for Derek Lam, Diane Von Fürstenberg, Marc Jacobs, and Peter Som. Finally, she did modeling for the fragrance Moschino Funny and for the Neiman Marcus catalog. In 2006, Jagodzińska appeared on the cover of German Vogue and in a Vogue Italia editorial. She also continued to appear in ads for Moschino and modeled in H&M's spring ad campaign. Jagodzińska then took a break from modeling to focus on study.

Jagodzińska made a "meteoric return" to modeling in February 2008, when she walked in Fall 2008 fashion shows for Balenciaga, Chanel, Givenchy, Louis Vuitton, and others. Later that year, she appeared on the covers of Japanese Numéro and Vogue Italia. She also did editorial work in Numéro, Vogue Paris, Japanese Vogue, Harper's Bazaar, and V. She featured as a 'Face of the Moment' in May 2009's US Vogue. Jagodzińska appeared in 58 shows for Spring 2009 fashion week. She modeled in twelve advertising campaigns for spring 2009. She walked in the annual 2009 Victoria's Secret Fashion Show in New York City for the first time. In 2010, Jagodzińska was featured with David Gandy in the "Light Blue" fragrance advert for Dolce & Gabbana which was photographed by Mario Testino.

Jagodzińska has appeared in campaigns for Donna Karan, GAP, Tom Ford, Neiman Marcus, Dolce & Gabbana, Tommy Hilfiger, Stella McCartney, Calvin Klein, Reserved, David Yurman, Oscar de la Renta, Prada, Chloé, Bottega Veneta, H&M, Gianfranco Ferré, Balenciaga, Alberta Ferretti, Moschino, and Max Azria. She has appeared in editorials for British, Chinese, Australian, Japanese, French, Italian, American, Portuguese, and German Vogue, Harpers Bazaar, i-D,W, V, French and Japanese Numéro.

== Lawsuit ==
It was reported in November 2010 that Jagodzińska had sued her agency (NEXT Model Management) alongside fellow Next models Karmen Pedaru and Anna Aleksandra Cywinska. According to the lawsuit, Next was “collecting and converting hundreds of thousands of dollars of their earmarked compensation remitted by third parties for bookings in the United States” and not passing on the cash. Jagodzińska claimed Next owed her $230,000 and also sought $1 million in punitive damages. As of 2012, no resolution had been made public.

== See also ==
- List of Poles
- Anja Rubik
