= Bohdán Bohdánov =

Ukrainian photographer (born 1996)

- Богдана Богданова
- Born: 1996 (age 29–30); Luhansk Oblast, Ukraine
- Education: Luhansk State Academy of Culture and Arts
- Occupation: Fashion photographer
- Website: bohdanbohdanov.com

Bohdán Bohdánov (Ukrainian: Богдана Богданова; born 1996) is a Ukrainian fashion photographer based between Paris, France and Milan, Italy.

== Early life and education ==
Bohdánov was born in 1996 and raised in a mining town in the Luhansk region of Ukraine. He studied photography at the Luhansk State Academy of Culture and Arts, due to the War in Donbas he left following his first year of study. He moved to Crimea and then to Moscow, Russia.

== Career ==
It was in Moscow that Bohdánov began shooting PR images for celebrities. During this period he photographed Rita Dakota, Maria Minogarova, Victoria Bonya, and Kseniya Borodina among others. Prior to leaving Luhansk he worked for a local fashion magazine.

Bohdánov has created photoshoots for Another Man China, L'Officiel, L'Officiel Italia, L'Officiel Hommes Italia, Numéro Netherlands, Numéro Switzerland, T China, Vogue Adria, Vogue Arabia, Vogue Czechoslovakia, Vogue Polska, Vogue Portugal, Vogue Taiwan, and lookbooks for Miss Sohee and Robert Wun.
