= Hana Knížová =

Czech photographer

- Education: Master's degree in Photography
- Alma mater: London College of Communication
- Occupation: Photographer
- Known for: Portrait photography
- Awards: John Kobal New Work Award (2013), Photographer of the Year by Czech Grand Design (2019, 2023)

Hana Knížová (Czech pronunciation: [ˈkniːʒovaː]) is a Czech photographic artist who uses conceptual and intimate portrait photography to explore themes of youth, identity, and interpersonal relationships. She is based in London and Prague.

== Early life and education ==
Knížová relocated to London in 2010, where she pursued and completed a master's degree in photography at the London College of Communication.

== Career ==
In 2013, she won the John Kobal New Work Award from the National Portrait Gallery, London for her portrait of identical twins Elza and Nellie, emphasizing her focus on family narratives.

Her work appeared in the 2013 Taylor Wessing Photographic Portrait Prize at the National Portrait Gallery.

In 2018, she was named Photographer of the Year at the Czech Grand Design Awards, and again in 2023.

Her portrait of Olivia Colman, commissioned as part of the John Kobal New Work Award and showcased at the National Portrait Gallery is included in the Gallery's permanent collection. Her projects have been covered in various outlets, showcasing her range and depth as a photographer.

Knížová has worked with fashion brands such as Alexander McQueen, Stella McCartney, Hugo Boss, Levi Strauss & Co. and her editorial work has appeared in publications like Dazed & Confused, Vogue, Harper's Bazaar, Tatler, The Telegraph.

== Exhibitions ==
Knížová has participated in solo and group exhibitions globally.

Year	Exhibition	Venue	Location	Source
2024	"Made by Fire"	Uměleckoprůmyslové muzeum	Brno	
2023	"Photographer of the Year"	Czech Grand Design		
2023	"Mothers"	National Gallery of Bosnia and Herzegovina	Sarajevo	
2023	"Mothers"	Mesnographies	Les Mesnuls, France	
2022	"Art Design Fashion" (permanent collection)	Uměleckoprůmyslové muzeum	Brno	
2021	"Tender"	The Vitrínka Gallery	London	
2019	"Photographer of the Year"	Czech Grand Design		
2019	"Tender"	Czech Centre	New York	
2018	"209 Women"	Portcullis House	London	
2017	"Portrait of Britain"	British Journal of Photography		
2017	"Take Festival"	Liquid Market	Vienna	
2016	"JURAPLATZ Art Space"		Biel/Bienne	
2016	"NatAaL at aFriCa UtOPia"	Royal Festival Hall	London	
2015	"Bizarre Behaviour"	Haus Ungarn	Berlin	
2015	"Life Framer"	Think Tank Gallery	Los Angeles	
2014	"Taylor Wessing Photographic Portrait Prize"	Scottish National Portrait Gallery		
2014	"John Kobal New Work Award"	National Portrait Gallery, London	London	
2014	"Hamr na Jezere"	Arcane Gallery	London	
2013	"Taylor Wessing Photographic Portrait Prize"	Bristol Museum		
2013	"John Kobal New Work Award"	National Portrait Gallery, London	London	
