= Julia Hafstrom =

Swedish fashion model (born 1992)

- Born: 11 May 1992 (age 34); Malmö, Sweden
- Occupation: Model
- Years active: 2009-present
- Modeling information
- Height: 1.74 m (5 ft 8 1/2 in)
- Hair color: Red
- Eye color: Hazel
- Agency: IMG Models (worldwide); Mega Model Agency (Hamburg); New Blood Agency (Stockholm) (mother agency)

Julia Hafstrom is a Swedish fashion model.

== Career ==
Hafstrom debuted at Prada resort and Miu Miu in 2009; famed photographer Steven Meisel personally requested her for a campaign.

Hafstrom has appeared in multiple Tommy Hilfiger campaigns including an ensemble with models such as Toni Garrn, Noah Mills, Tao Okamoto, Gracie Carvalho, and Jacquelyn Jablonski.

For her work with Gucci, American Vogue, MAC Cosmetics, and Tiffany and Co., models.com lists her as a "Money Girl". She has appeared in ads for brands such as Alexander Wang, Sephora, Max Mara, Gucci, Blumarine, Ralph Lauren, Dior Beauty, and Mango.

Hafstrom has been on the cover of CR Fashion Book.
