= Sam Rollinson =

British model

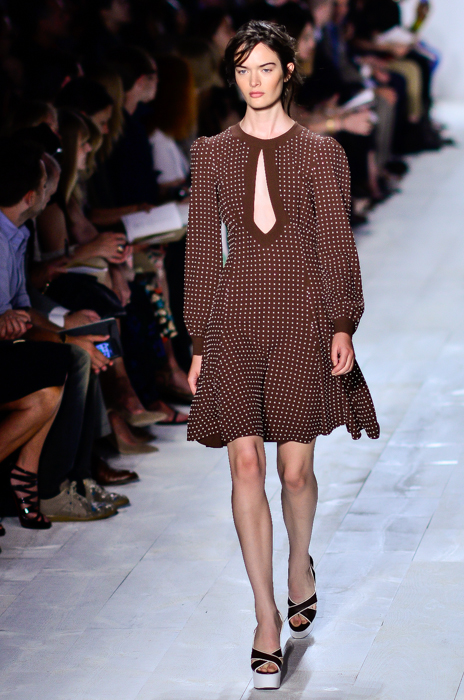
- Rollinson at New York Fashion Week, September 2013.
- Born: Samantha Jane Rollinson; 19 August 1994 (age 32); Doncaster, South Yorkshire, England
- Occupation: Fashion model
- Spouse: Matt Richardson
- Modelling information
- Height: 1.76 m (5 ft 9 1/2 in)
- Hair colour: Brown
- Eye colour: Blue
- Agency: Women Management (New York, Paris); Longteng Model Management (Beijing); Select Model Management (Los Angeles, Milan, London) (mother agency)

Samantha Jane Rollinson (born 19 August 1994) is a British fashion model.

== Early life ==
Rollinson was born in Doncaster, South Yorkshire, and has an older brother called Ben. She began modelling at 13, after she was scouted by Select Model Management at The Clothes Show Live, and after signing a contract in London, she was sent on test shoots.

== Career ==
At age 15, Rollinson shot her first campaign, photographed by Mario Testino, for Burberry; alongside model Rosie Huntington-Whiteley and actor Douglas Booth. Her first runway show happened in 2012, walking exclusively for Balenciaga and closing the show. After her debut, Rollinson walked in over 63 shows for designers including Chanel, Altuzarra, Stella McCartney, Chloé, Hermès, Celine, Saint Laurent, Emilia Wickstead, Dior, Prada, Louis Vuitton, Victoria Beckham, Vera Wang, Marc Jacobs, Fendi, Roberto Cavalli, Christopher Kane, Jil Sander, and Marni.

She has appeared on the cover of British, Serbian, Japanese, and Singaporean editions of Harper's Bazaar, Wonderland, and i-D as well as campaigns for Chanel, Balenciaga, and Mulberry.
