= Kateřina Šimáčková =

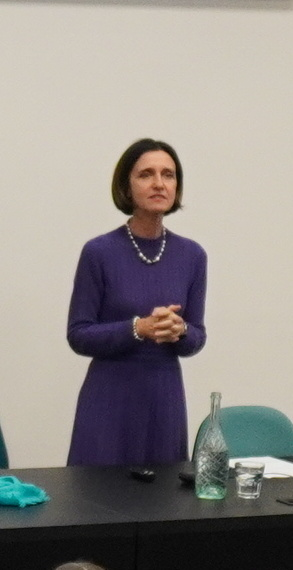
Image of Kateřina Šimáčková

Kateřina Šimáčková (born 1966) is a Czech judge who served on the Constitutional Court of the Czech Republic since 2013. On 28 September 2021, she was elected a judge of the European Court of Human Rights with respect to the Czech Republic, replacing Aleš Pejchal. Šimáčková remains with the Czech Constitutional Court until 13 December 2021 at which point she will go to Strasbourg.

In 2021, she received the distinction of the French Legion of Honour for her role in promoting human rights.
