= Olivia Vinten =

Danish fashion model (born 1999)

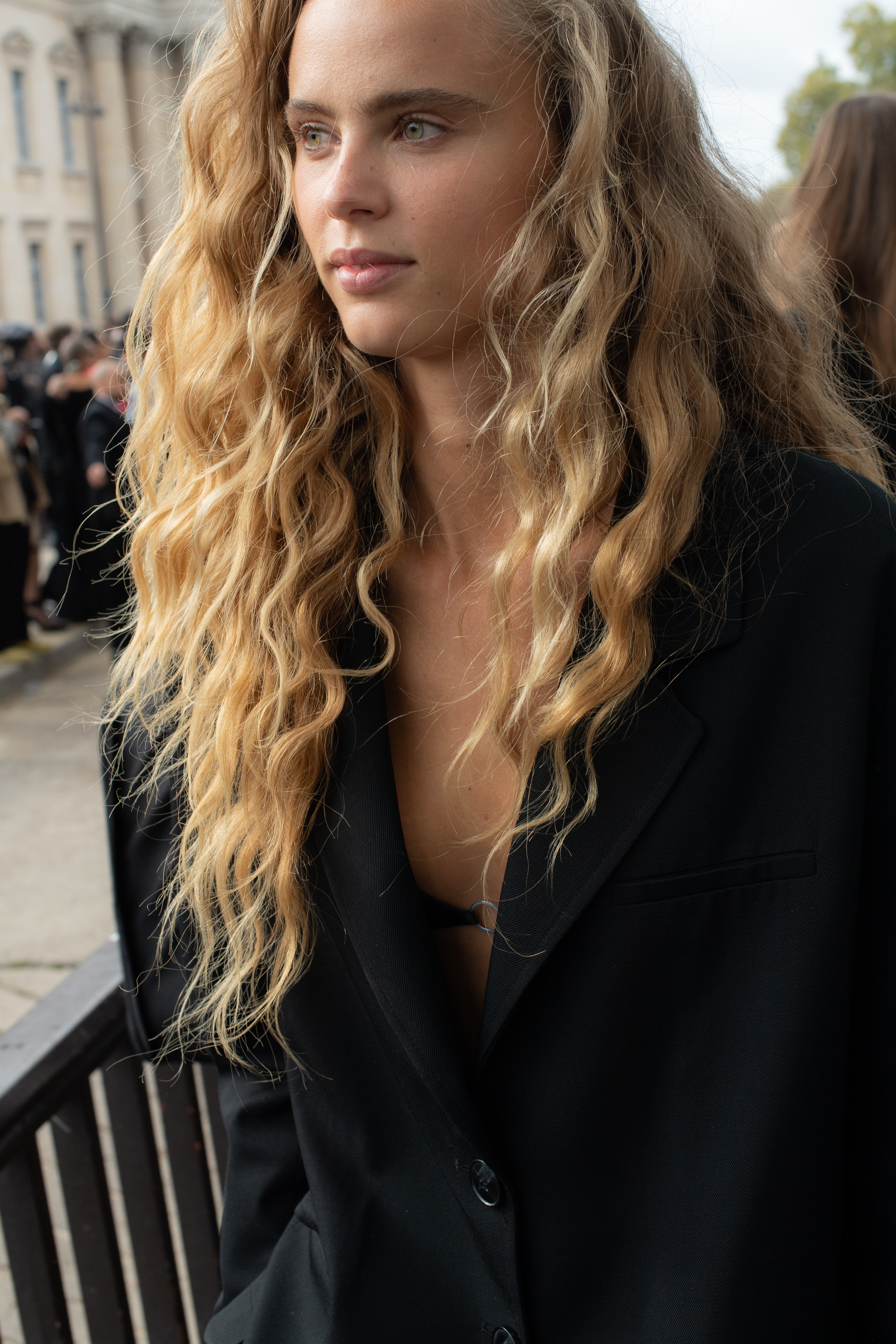
- Vinten at the Paris Fashion Week 2024
- Born: Olivia Ohrt Vinten; 7 April 1999 (age 27); Copenhagen, Denmark
- Years active: 2018–present
- Modeling information
- Height: 1.78 m (5 ft 10 in)
- Hair color: Blonde
- Eye color: Green
- Agency: DNA Models (New York); Select Model Management (London); Ford Models (Paris); Fabbrica Milano Management (Milan); A Management (Hamburg); 2pm Management (Copenhagen)

Olivia Ohrt Vinten (born 7 April 1999) is a Danish fashion model.

== Early life ==
Vinten was born in Copenhagen, Denmark. Her father is half-Guyanese and her mother is Danish; she has two sisters and two brothers. She graduated from Rysensteen Gymnasium.

== Career ==
Vinten was initially discovered at age 12, but began modeling full-time in 2018, when she debuted on the runway as a Fendi exclusive. The next season, Vinten walked for Etro, Hugo Boss, Moncler, Off-White, Blumarine, and Giambattista Valli. In the S/S 2020 season, Vinten walked for Oscar de la Renta (which she opened), Zimmermann, and Marc Jacobs among others. In December 2019, Vinten appeared in a Vogue editorial. In January 2020, she appeared on an illustrated cover of Vogue Italia, and she appeared in British Vogue, for the first time, in March 2020. In November 2021, Vinten appeared on the cover of Russh magazine.

Off duty, Vinten is known for her tomboy style.
