= Julia Banaś =

Polish model

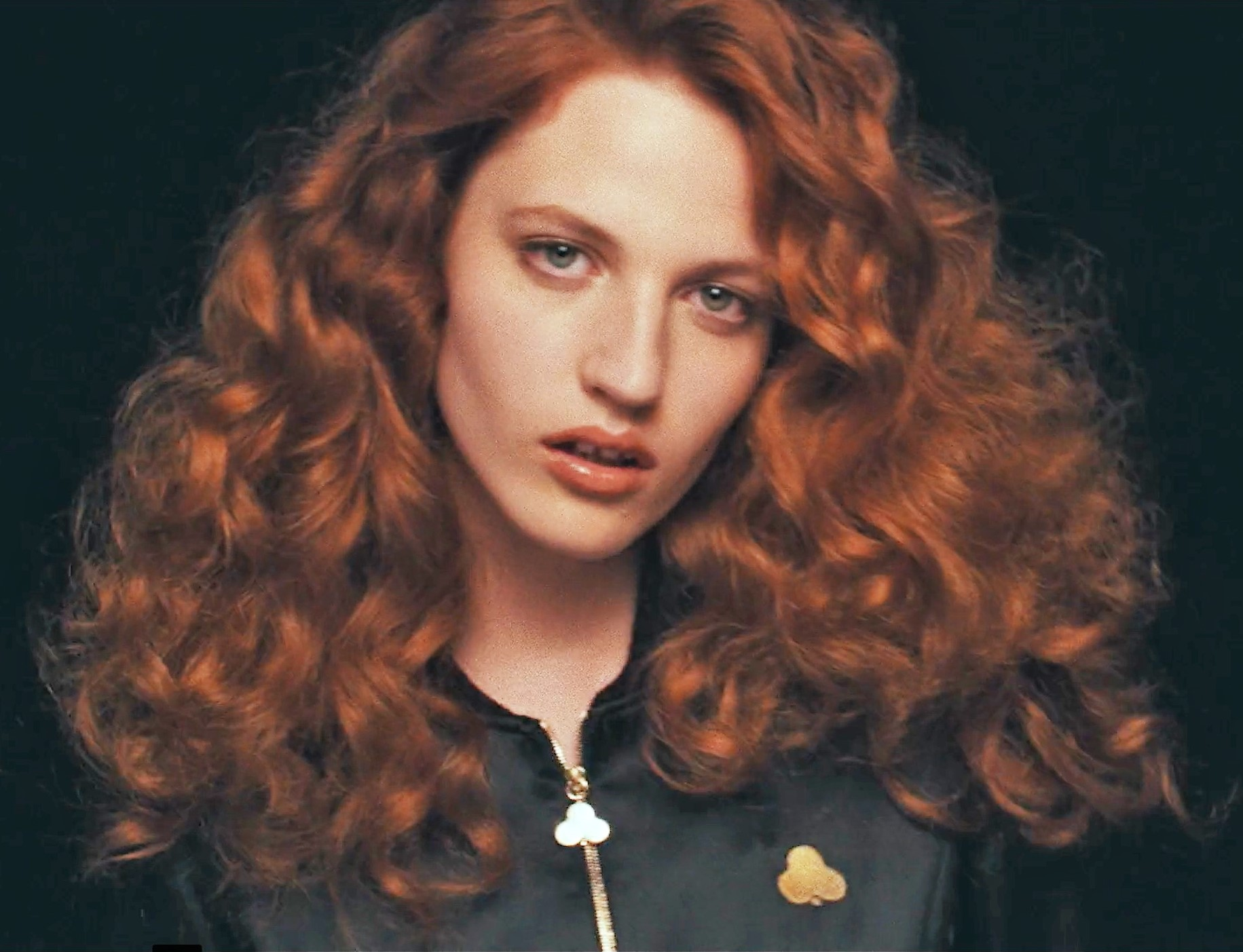
- Banas for Chaos accessories, 2016
- Born: 6 June 1997 (age 28); Częstochowa, Poland
- Modeling information
- Height: 5 ft 11 in (180 cm)
- Hair color: Red
- Eye color: Green
- Agency: The Society Management (New York); Elite Model Management (Paris, Milan, London, Barcelona, Copenhagen); Modelwerk (Hamburg); Munich Models (Munich); Modellink (Stockholm); Model Plus (Warsaw)

Julia Banaś (born 6 June 1997) is a Polish fashion model.

== Career ==
Banaś was discovered at age 17, and debuted as a Miu Miu and Fendi exclusive in 2016. She’s also walked for DKNY, Moschino, Altuzarra, Fila, Marni, Hermès, and L’Oréal.

In 2015, she won Glamour Poland's Woman of the Year award.

Banaś has been on the cover of Vogue Portugal, The Edit, Elle Poland, and Marie Claire Italy. She has appeared in H&M Magazine, Vogue Italia, W, Allure, Love, Numéro, The Daily Telegraph, Vogue Paris, V, The Sunday Times, Vogue Mexico, Vogue Australia, Vogue China, Vogue Japan, and Vogue Poland.

Banaś has done ads for Gucci, Sephora, Aldo, Zara, Marc Jacobs, Oysho, Emporio Armani, and Stella McCartney.

Banaś is also a skilled gardener having done gardening work for Elle Magazine.
