= Patrick Bienert =

German photographer

- Born: 1980 (age 45–46); Munich, Germany
- Known for: Fashion and Documentary Photographer
- Website: www.patrickbienert.com

Patrick Bienert (born 1980) is a German photographer who works on long-term projects of portrait, landscape and documentary photography. He predominantly documents youth culture and transformation on the borders of Eastern Europe. In January 2020, he published the book East End of Europe, about a pro-European generation in Georgia. In 2017, Bienert published the book Wake Up Nights, about young nightlife culture in Ukraine.

His projects are grounded in cultures and identity in relation to the history and its traces between the land and its inhabitants.

== Early life and education ==
Bienert was born in 1980 and grew up in Munich, Germany, where he studied photography at the Bayerische Staatslehranstalt für Photographie and the Munich University of Applied Sciences until 2006.

== Career ==
His photography project East End of Europe about a pro-European generation in Georgia was published in 2020 as a book by Kahl Editions. (Note: Publisher's description of East End of Europe, Kahl Editions, 25 February 2020. Accessed 2 March 2021.) Another Magazine included the monograph in its list of must-have photo books in 2020. Other bodies of Bienert's work include Asmara (2013), (Note: For a portfolio, see "Asmara", Lensculture. Accessed 17 January 2022.) in which he photographed both the modernist architecture of Asmara, the capital of Eritrea, from the period of the Italian colonisation, and the city's current inhabitants; Clothing Trade, (Note: For a portfolio, see "Clothing Trade", Lensculture. Accessed 17 January 2022.) a project about the second-hand clothing industry in Tunisia (2018); and Banks of Dnister (2019), (Note: For a portfolio, see "Banks of Dnister", Lensculture. Accessed 17 January 2022.) for which he followed the Dnister river along its route through Moldova, the breakaway state Transnistria and Ukraine, portraying the youth culture and the landscapes in the post-Soviet states.

Bienert's work has been published in The New York Times Magazine, The Atlantic, Double Magazine and Zeit Magazin. In 2018 he received a grant from the Goethe-Institut to work on his project about the second-hand clothing industry in Tunisia. His personal projects have been exhibited at OFR Galerie in Paris; Deichtorhallen, Hamburg, Germany; Amphithéâtre de Carthage, Tunisia; and Store Studios, London. Commissioned by the fashion brand Jil Sander, Bienert photographed at the Italian island of Ponza for the brand's pre-fall 2020 advertisements.

== Publications ==
- Wake Up Nights. Self-published, 2017. Edition of 500 copies.
- East End of Europe. With an essay by Florian Illies. Kahl, 2020. ISBN 978-0995761162. Edition of 500 copies.

== Exhibitions ==
- Asmara, Deichtorhallen, Hamburg, Germany, 2013
- Wake up Nights, Store Studios London, 2018
- Post Soviet Visions, Wake up Nights, Calvert 22 Foundation, London, 2018
- Wake up Nights, Capitis Studios, Berlin, 2018
- Wake up Nights, Ngorongoro, Berlin, 2018
- Clothing Trade, Tbilisi Photo Festival, Tbilisi, Georgia, 2019
- Conversations, Webber Gallery, London, 2018
- East End of Europe, Republic Square, Tbilisi, Georgia, 2019
- Clothing Trade, Amphithéâtre de Carthage, Tunisia, 2019
- East End of Europe, OFR Galerie, Paris, 2020 (Note: "Press – East End of Europe – Patrick Bienert", Kahl Editions. Accessed 2 March 2021.)

== Films ==
- Kiev (2018) – short film

== Awards ==
- Rovinj Photodays Award, Clothing Trade, Grand Prix, 2020
