= Vogue Ukraine =

Ukrainian fashion magazine

- Cover of the Spring 2024 issue, featuring Karyna Maziar
- Editor-In-Chief: Vena Brykalin
- Categories: Fashion
- Frequency: Quarterly
- Publisher: Condé Nast
- Founded: 2013; 13 years ago
- Company: Media Group Ukraine
- Country: Ukraine
- Based in: Kyiv
- Language: Ukrainian
- Website: vogue.ua

Vogue Ukraine (or Vogue Україна in Ukrainian) is the Ukrainian edition of the American fashion and lifestyle monthly magazine Vogue. The magazine has been published since March 2013, becoming the twenty-first local edition of Vogue.

== Publication history ==
In June 2012, it was announced that the Ukrainian edition of Vogue was in preparation, with Masha Tsukanova as editor-in-chief. Vogue Ukraine launched in March 2013 is published in partnership with Media Group Ukraine. The magazine has become known worldwide as an artistic edition with its own visual identity.

Vogue Ukraine is a multi-media brand that includes the monthly printed magazine and supplements with pdf version as well as digital platform vogue.ua with a high level of readers engagement at social media and YouTube channels.

=== Editor-in-Chief ===
- Masha Tsukanova (2013–2016)
- Olha Sushko (2016–2018)
- Philipp Vlasov (2019–2022)
- Vena Brykalin (2023-present)

== Content ==
In October 2018, The Calvert Journal named the best Vogue Ukraine cover in the magazine’s five-year history:

Among the imagery produced during the five-year history of Vogue Ukraine, it’s the January 2018 cover which perhaps stands out the most. It features the South Sudanese-British model Alek Wek (her first-ever solo Vogue cover) shot on an LA beach by Alexander Saladrigas. Wek is wearing a voluminous yellow puffer jacket and glistering turquoise tights-boots, head-to-toe Balenciaga. The image is striking: partly due to the surreal mismatch of the outfit and the settings — palm trees and pale golden sand more suited to surfers and LA-natives on a leisurely stroll — but also because of the cutting-edge idea of beauty it projects.

The December 2019 issue of the Ukrainian edition of Vogue unveils a project starring Olena Zelenska, the country’s First Lady. The photo shoot featuring an international team translated into a full-fledged magazine story with the heroine telling about her life in the new capacity, new obligations and opportunities, and fashion as a tool of cultural diplomacy, according to Kyiv Post.

It has elevated brands such as Who Is It clothing.

== FUTURESPECTIVE ==
In May 2025, Vogue Ukraine, in collaboration with PhotoVogue, announced the 15 finalists of FUTURESPECTIVE 2025, an initiative to elevate Ukrainian art and fashion photographers:

- Elena Subach received the Jury Choice award.
- Alina Prisich was named Discovery of the Year.
- Vic Bakin received the Special View award.

== See also ==
- List of Vogue Ukraine cover models
