= Magdalena Jasek =

Polish fashion model

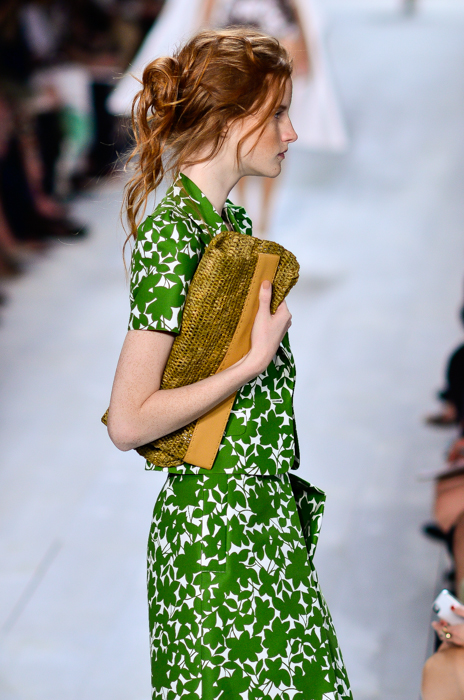
- Jasek walking for Michael Kors in 2013
- Born: 28 November 1993 (age 32); Warsaw, Poland
- Other name: Magdę Jasek
- Occupation: Model
- Modeling information
- Height: 1.80 m (5 ft 11 in)
- Hair color: Red
- Eye color: Blue
- Agency: The Society Management (New York); Oui Management (Paris); Why Not Model Management (Milan); Select Model Management (London); Uno Models (Barcelona); Elite Model Management (Copenhagen); Model Management (Hamburg); Munich Models (Munich); Joy Model Management (São Paulo); Donna Models (Tokyo); METRO Models (Zurich); Model Plus (Warsaw) (mother agency)

Magdalena Jasek is a Polish fashion model.

== Career ==
Jasek was discovered by sending her photos to a Polish magazine twice at age 14. At the shoot, the photographer set her up with Marilyn Agency. During her school years she only worked in Paris for haute couture shows. When she was old enough to have a visa she started doing international fashion weeks; opening Celine, and walking for designers including Marc Jacobs, Alexander McQueen, Balenciaga, Louis Vuitton (for whom she also did an advertisement), Kenzo, Saint Laurent, Valentino, Maison Margiela, Giambattista Valli, Rag & Bone, Calvin Klein, Giorgio Armani, Givenchy, and Fendi. The next year, 2014, Elle Poland chose her as their "Model of the Year", and she appeared on a cover of Elle Brasil with Camille Rowe and Ysaunny Brito.

She appeared in an ensemble Prada campaign alongside models including Cindy Bruna, Amanda Murphy, Julia Bergshoeff, Anna Ewers, Lexi Boling, and Malaika Firth. For Opening Ceremony, she appeared in a Spike Jonze- and Jonah Hill-written play about fashion week called 100% Cotton, also starring Elle Fanning, Karlie Kloss, Dree Hemingway, Alia Shawkat, Catherine Keener, Bobby Cannavale, John Cameron Mitchell, and Rashida Jones.

Jasek’s growing prominence in the fashion industry was reflected in her recognition by Models.com. In 2013, she was named to the publication’s Hot List, which highlights the most promising emerging models in the industry. Following a successful year that included major runway appearances and advertising campaigns for luxury fashion houses, she was promoted to the Models.com Top 50 models ranking in 2014.

Her campaign portfolio expanded during this period to include Valentino’s Spring/Summer 2013 and Fall/Winter 2013–14 campaigns, as well as campaigns for Marc by Marc Jacobs, Carven Spring/Summer 2015, and the Polish fashion label Bohoboco.
