= Ola Rudnicka =

Polish fashion model

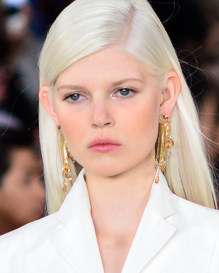
- Rudnicka walking the runway for Ralph Lauren, 2015
- Born: Aleksandra Rudnicka; 10 October 1994 (age 31); Warsaw, Poland
- Modeling information
- Height: 1.76 m (5 ft 9 1/2 in)
- Hair color: Platinum blonde
- Eye color: Blue
- Agency: View Management (Barcelona); Seeds Management (Berlin); Unique Models (Copenhagen); Model Management (Hamburg); Next Management (Los Angeles, Paris, Milan); MIKAs (Stockholm); Donna Models (Tokyo); METRO Models (Zürich); Models Plus (Warsaw) (mother agency)

Aleksandra "Ola" Rudnicka (born 10 October 1994) is a Polish fashion model based in Paris, France. She is known as a muse for Chanel.

== Career ==
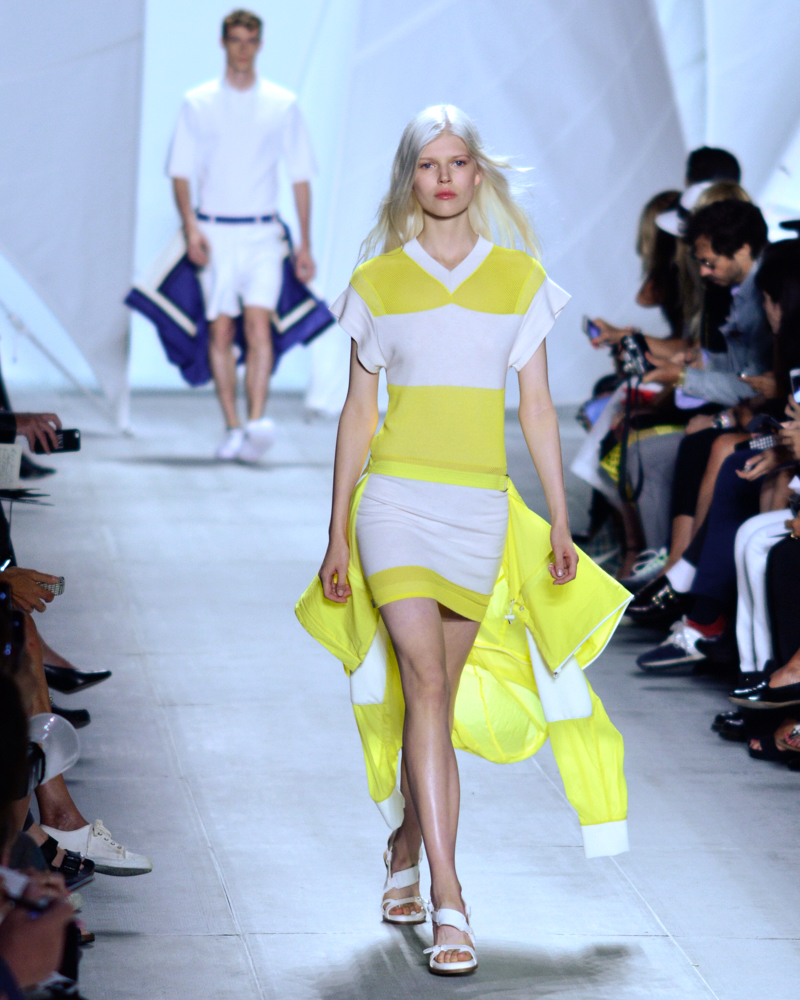
Rudnicka walking for Lacoste in 2020

Rudnicka was discovered in Warsaw at the age of 15 at a Zara store, and she started her career after moving to Paris to rejoin her mother and attend university. Rudnicka debuted as a Prada exclusive (both on the runway and in the campaign with an ensemble cast); after doing so, she became one of the "Top 50" models on models.com. In 2014, she appeared in a Vogue editorial which paid homage to a 1948 photo by Cecil Beaton. According to Vogue Poland and Vogue France, she has appeared in every Chanel show since 2014. She is the face of the 2022 pre-collection. Directed by Sofia and Roman Coppola, she appeared alongside models including Gigi Hadid, Rebecca Leigh Longendyke, Anna Ewers, Vittoria Ceretti, and Mona Tougaard in a short film for Chanel dedicated to the late designer Karl Lagerfeld.

Rudnicka has walked the runway for 3.1 Phillip Lim, Dolce & Gabbana, Victoria Beckham, Chloé, Dior, Valentino, Roberto Cavalli, Marc Jacobs, Calvin Klein, Diane von Fürstenberg and others.
