= Ewa Pacuła =

American model

Ewa Pacuła aka Ewa Saleta
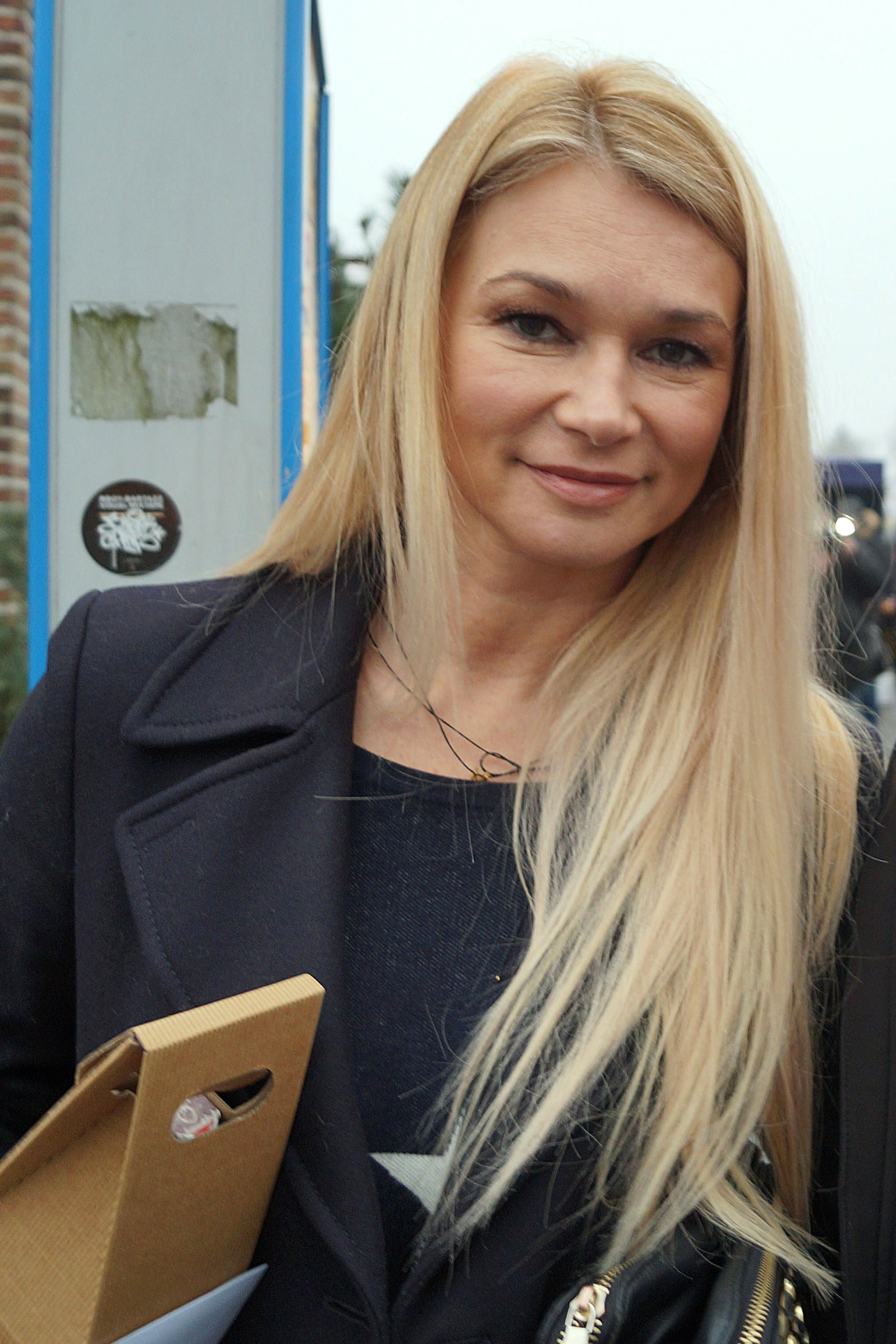
- Born: 1971 (age 54–55); Tomaszów Lubelski, Poland
- Modeling information
- Height: 173
- Hair color: blonde
- Eye color: green
- Agency: Gudejko: Warsaw, L.A. Models: Los Angeles, MC2 Model Management: Miami

Ewa Pacuła (born in 1971) began her modeling career in the United States at the age of nineteen in 1990 with help from her sister Joanna Pacuła, who had already established herself in Hollywood. Her first individual photo session was arranged at her home in Los Angeles. Ewa soon began to appear on the catwalk, promoting such collections as the Emporio Armani. Later, she signed a contract with a modeling agency in Miami. Although she also received an offer to work in Paris, she declined and in 1993 returned to Poland to begin modeling for the Polish high-fashion market.

Pacuła became a TV presenter in the late 1990s and appeared on Canal +'s regular programs, and later was the hostess of TV program Warszawianka on TVN in Warsaw. She currently hosts a program called Dobrenocki for the Polsat Cafe. She has played recurring roles in Now or Never! and Tenants. In 2005, she posed for the Polish edition of "Playboy".
