= Zuzanna Bijoch =

Polish model

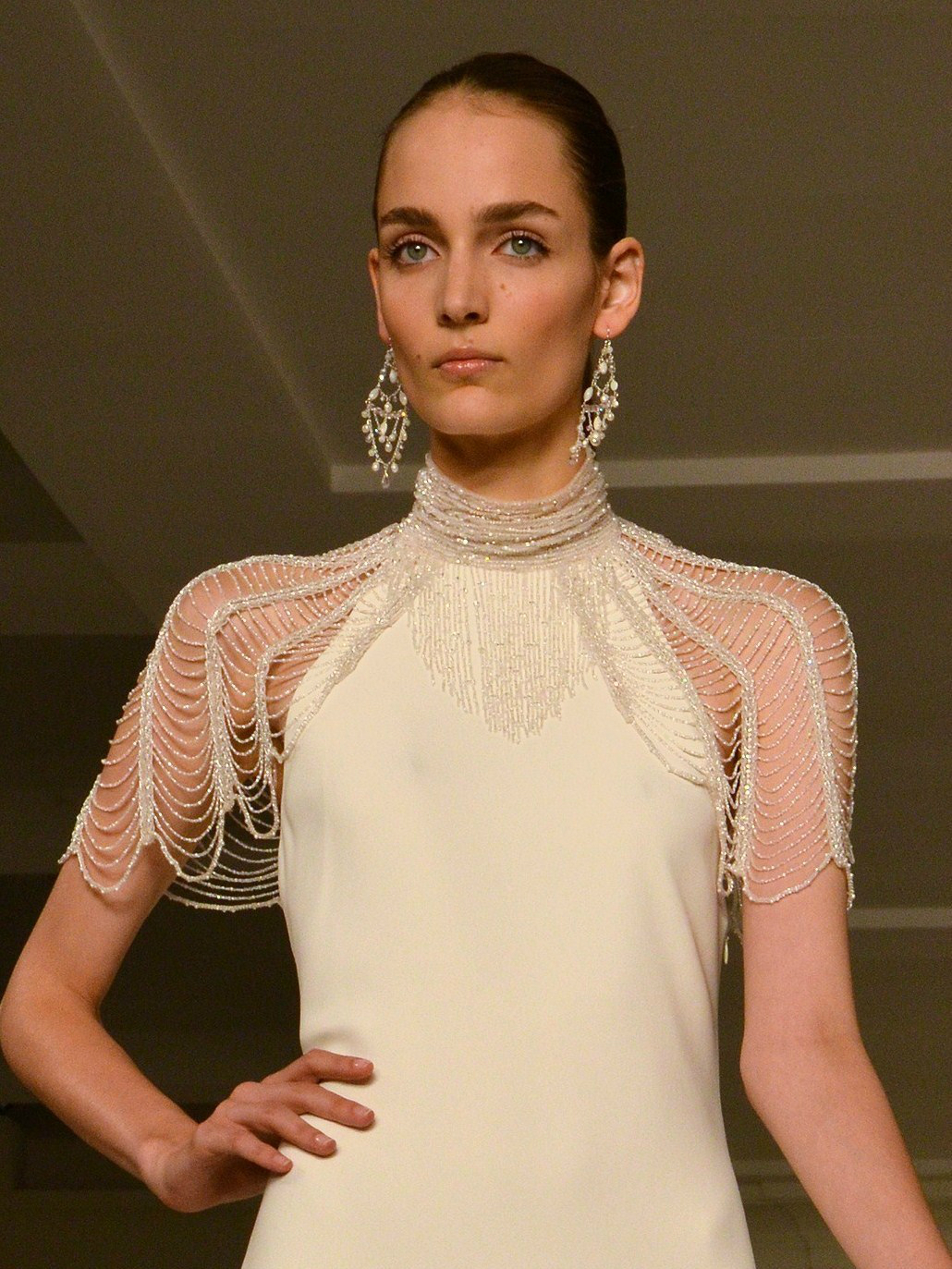
- Zuzanna Bijoch in 2013
- Born: 20 June 1994 (age 31); Katowice, Poland
- Other names: Zuza Bijoch
- Modeling information
- Height: 1.80 m (5 ft 11 in)
- Hair color: Brown
- Eye color: Green
- Agency: Next Management (New York, Paris, Milan, London, Los Angeles, Miami); View Management (Barcelona); 2pm Model Management (Copenhagen); Modelwerk (Hamburg); MIKAs (Stockholm); Chic Management (Sydney); D'VISION (Warsaw)

Zuzanna Bijoch (born 20 June 1994) is a Polish fashion model.

== Career ==
Bijoch was discovered at a modeling competition in Poland and booked a Prada campaign while in high school. She debuted at Georges Chakra in 2010 and walked for the spring Jason Wu, Topshop Unique, Salvatore Ferragamo, Marni, and Prada; she walked for Miu Miu in the 2011 season. For her work with Alexander McQueen, Valentino, Gucci, and Chloé, she was ranked on models.com’s “Top 50” list from 2014. She has also modeled for Givenchy, Marc Jacobs and a Louis Vuitton campaign. Bijoch walked over 50 shows in the 2011/12 season including Thakoon, Narciso Rodriguez, Nina Ricci, Victoria Beckham, Gianfranco Ferré, Moschino, and Balenciaga (which she closed).

Bijoch has been a guest judge on Poland’s Top Model.

== Personal life ==
In 2023, Bijoch graduated summa cum laude from Columbia University with a bachelor's degree in financial economics. She was valedictorian of the School of General Studies. The same year, she accepted a position at BDT & MSD Partners, a merchant bank headquartered in New York City.
