= Vogue Polska =

Polish fashion magazine

- First issue of Vogue Polska (March 2018)
- Editor-in-Chief: Ina Lekiewicz Levy
- Categories: Fashion
- Frequency: monthly
- Founded: 2018; 8 years ago
- Company: Visteria Sp. z o.o.
- Country: Poland
- Based in: Warsaw
- Website: www.vogue.pl

Vogue Polska is the Polish edition of the American fashion and lifestyle monthly magazine Vogue. It has been published since February 2018 and is the twenty-third local edition of Vogue.

== Publication history ==
In June 2017, it was announced that the Polish edition of Vogue was in preparation, with Filip Niedenthal as editor-in-chief. The local publisher, Visteria, signed a 5-year licence deal with the publisher of the original American version, Condé Nast, which was later extended for another five years. The printed magazine and its website were launched simultaneously on 14 February 2018. The circulation of the first issue was 160,000 copies and its cover featured the Polish models Anja Rubik and Małgosia Bela.

== Special issues and supplements ==
Vogue Polska has published a number of one-time and ongoing special issues and supplements, including Vogue Beauty, Vogue Travel, Vogue Living, Vogue Man, and Vogue Leaders. Since 2025, Vogue Polska Living has been published as a regular quarterly.

== Controversy ==
The cover photograph of the first issue caused controversy in Poland. Taken by Jürgen Teller, it featured Rubik and Bela standing next to a vintage Soviet-produced Volga GAZ-24, with Warsaw's Palace of Culture and Science in the background. Critics objected to the use of imagery associated with Poland's communist past, as well as to the photograph's deliberately austere aesthetic. Supporters praised the cover for departing from the conventions of fashion photography and presenting an unconventional image of contemporary Poland.

== See also ==
- List of Vogue Polska cover models
