= Anja Rubik =

Polish model and businesswoman (born 1983)

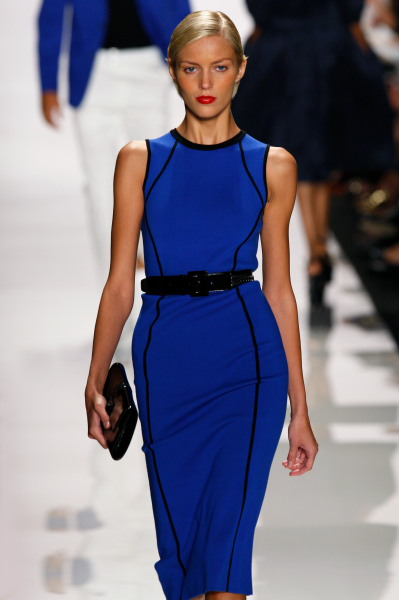
- Rubik in 2008
- Born: Anna Helena Rubik; 12 June 1983 (age 43); Rzeszów, Poland
- Occupation: Model
- Years active: 1998–present
- Spouse: Saša Knežević (m. 2011; div. 2015)
- Modeling information
- Height: 1.79 m (5 ft 10 1/2 in)
- Hair color: Brunette
- Eye color: Blue
- Agency: DNA Model Management (New York); SAFE Mgmt (Paris); Next Model Management (Milan); D'VISION (Warsaw)
- Website: www.anjarubik.com

Anja Rubik (born Anna Helena Rubik; 12 June 1983) is a Polish supermodel, activist, philanthropist and entrepreneur. She is one of the most prominent models of the 20th and 21st century, continuously featuring on magazine covers, as well as runways and campaigns for the most notable fashion houses. By 2009, Rubik was dubbed a "top model" by French Vogue and continues to influence the fashion industry.

Rubik is the founder of SEXEDpl, a foundation that builds and promotes comprehensive sex education in Poland. Rubik also plays a substantial role in supporting the women's rights movement as well as the LGBT+ community in Poland, as an activist and public speaker. She lives and works between Paris, New York City and Warsaw.

== Early life ==
Rubik was born in Rzeszów, Poland. In 1983, she and her parents, both doctors of veterinary medicine, moved to Greece. They later moved to Winnipeg in Manitoba, Canada and, further, to Umtata in Transkei, South Africa. In 1994, they moved back to Poland to Częstochowa, where Rubik attended school. At thirteen she took part in the Elite Model Look, and later joined the D'ivision Model Agency. At the age of seventeen, Anja moved to Paris where she completed her education at a British high school, École Bilingue, and where she continued her modelling career. In 2003, she moved to New York City where she continues to live and work, dividing her time between the United States, Paris and Warsaw. Her family still lives in Poland.

== Career ==
=== Model ===
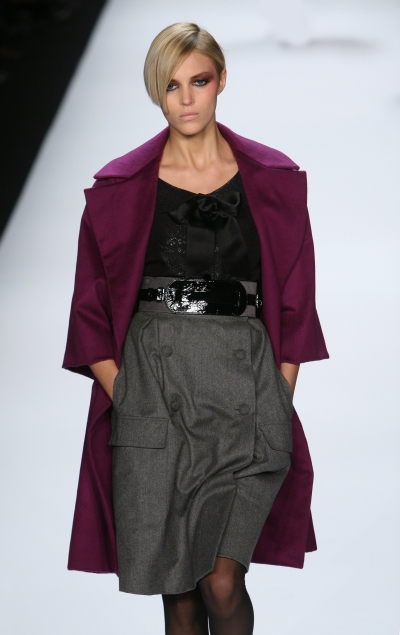
Rubik in 2008

Rubik made her runway debut during the Paris Fashion Week Fall/Winter 1998 Chanel haute couture show. Her modelling career started to take off after she landed her first campaign for Chloé photographed by Inez and Vinoodh. By the end of the year, she was labeled fashion's rising star by Style.com. By 2009, Rubik was dubbed a "top model" by French Vogue. In 2011, the International Business Times hailed "supermodel" Rubik as the "world's most in-demand model".

Vogue Paris declared Rubik one of the top 30 models of the aughts. In 2010 she was ranked as one of the top 25 Money Girls by models.com. By 2012, she was ranked as an Industry Icon.

In addition to her seven-year period as the face of Chloé, Rubik has fronted campaigns for Gucci for four consecutive seasons, photographed by Mert and Marcus, and Fendi for four consecutive seasons, photographed by Karl Lagerfeld. The designer-photographer has also photographed Rubik for numerous magazine covers including Chanel and the 2011 Pirelli Calendar. Lagerfeld has referred to Rubik as one of his favourite models.

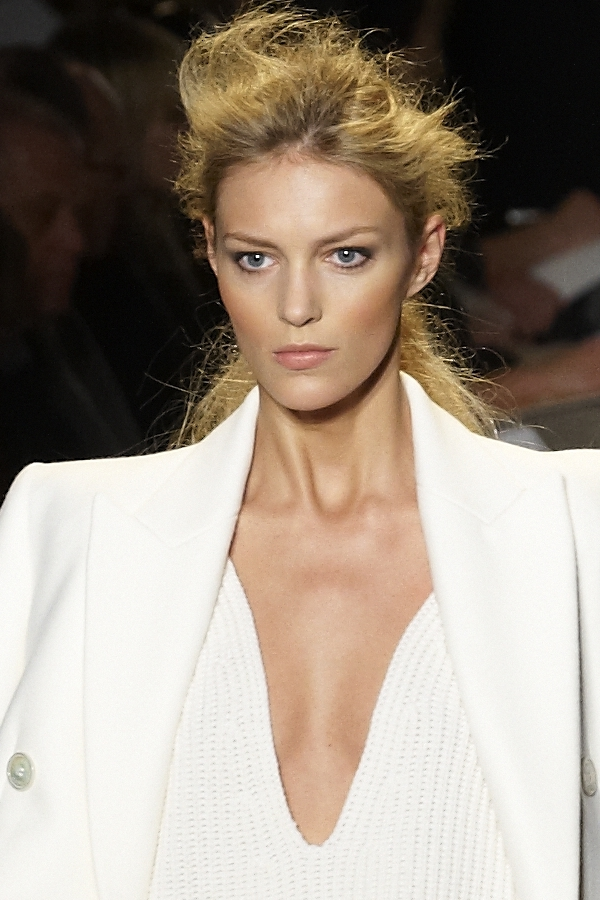
Rubik in 2010

Rubik has also starred in campaigns for Armani, Balmain, Dante Herró, Chanel, Dior, Elie Saab, Estée Lauder, Givenchy, Hermès, Lanvin, Valentino, and Yves Saint Laurent. Rubik was the face of Chloé's fragrance alongside Chloë Sevigny and Clémence Poésy, and she starred in Fendi's Fan di Fendi fragrance campaign with Mark Ronson. In addition, Rubik has been the principal in campaigns for Barneys New York, Belstaff, BLK DNM, Bottega Veneta, DKNY, Etro, Dante Herró, Forever 21, Gap, H&M, Jimmy Choo, Karl by Karl Lagerfeld, Kurt Geiger, La Perla, Lacoste, Mango, Marc Jacobs, Moschino, Oscar de la Renta, Ralph Lauren, Roberto Cavalli, Seven Jeans, Tod's, Tommy Hilfiger, and Zara.

Rubik has been modelling in London, Milan, New York, and Paris throughout the 2000s. Rubik's select runway appearances include the Haute Couture collections of Atelier Versace, Chanel, Christian Dior, Christian Lacroix, Jean-Paul Gaultier, Tom Ford and Valentino. She has walked the runway for the prêt-à-porter collections of Alexander McQueen, Alexander Wang, Anthony Vaccarello, Balenciaga, Balmain, Burberry Prorsum, Chloé (5 seasons), Emanuel Ungaro, Emilio Pucci, Fendi (4 seasons), Gucci (4 seasons), Isabel Marant, Kanye West's DW Kanye West line, Michael Kors, Prada, and Victoria's Secret among others.

Rubik has been featured on the covers of more than thirty international editions of Vogue. She was selected to cover the fourth issue of Porter magazine, following Gisele Bündchen, Lady Gaga and Lara Stone, and The New York Times Style Magazine. She has also covered international editions of Elle, Glamour, Harper's Bazaar, Nylon, Numéro, self service, and W magazines. She was one of the three Poles, alongside Lech Wałęsa and John Paul II, who appeared on the cover of Time magazine, photographed by Ben Hassett.

Rubik has worked with photographers and artists, such as Annie Leibovitz, Araki, Camilla Akrans, David Bailey, David Sims, Collier Schorr, Inez van Lamsweerde and Vinoodh Matadin, Ellen von Unwerth, Glen Luchford, Hans Feurer, Hedi Slimane, Juergen Teller, JR, Mario Testino, Mario Sorrenti, Michael Thompson, Nick Knight, Patrick Demarchelier, Peter Lindbergh, Paolo Roversi, Steven Klein, Steven Meisel, and Terry Richardson.

=== Lagerfeld's muse ===
Rubik has become one of Karl Lagerfeld's most recognizable muses and helped launch the career of Yves Saint Laurent's Creative Director, Anthony Vaccarello; she continues to be the inspiration behind his designs. Rubik met designer Vaccarello in 2011. She helped organize and starred in his first runway collection in 2012, and subsequently appeared in campaigns for his eponymous brand. She wore his first mile-high slit gown to the 2012 Met Gala, making worldwide headlines.

=== Creative design ===
In 2012, Rubik founded and created the annual 25 magazine, for which she also served as editor-in-chief. The magazine became a creative force showcasing artists and photographers from around the world, and their views of sensuality. Contributors include Alex Prager, Araki, Ben Gorham, Carsten Holler, Daniel Arsham, Hedi Slimane, Isabel Marant, Inez and Vinoodh, JR, Marina Abramović, and Woodkid.

In 2017, she collaborated with artist Erwin Wurm on a special edition of Numero Berlin.

Rubik has done capsule collections with Giuseppe Zanotti in 2013 and IRO in 2016.

In 2014, Rubik unveiled her own debut fragrance, Original by Anja Rubik. She was involved in every step of the creative process, including designing the bottle and the campaign, shot by Paola Kudacki. She continues to run the label as a private enterprise selling across the world.

In September 2015, Rubik made her directorial debut by directing Issue 04's teaser film featuring Andreea Diaconu, themed around the five senses.

In 2015, Rubik hosted and curated the Art & Fashion Forum, an open platform of inspiration and education. Art & Fashion Forum 2015 was the 9th edition of an event initiated by Grażyna Kulczyk, which is organized in Stary Browar in Poznań every year since 2007.

She was invited to lead a panel discussion for the 2016 Istanbul International Arts and Culture Festival together with Mirosław Bałka.

In recognition of her global entrepreneurial and philanthropic experience, she served as a member of the Board of Advisors at the Brooklyn Museum from 2016 to 2018.

In 2022, Rubik became a global ambassador of French luxury jewelry and watch house Boucheron as part of its "Icons" campaign. In 2023, she became a guest editor of Vogue Poland's March 2023 issue to celebrate the magazine's 5th anniversary.

=== Media and other appearances ===
Since 2010, Rubik has made several appearances on Top Model, the Polish edition of America's Next Top Model. In 2014, she became the host and a judge of the Polish version of the reality show Project Runway Poland.

In 2010, Rubik appeared as a judge in The Fashion Show, alongside Isaac Mizrahi, Iman and Laura Brown.

In 2014, Rubik starred in a music video for the song Chleb by Mister D., a music project of the Polish author Dorota Masłowska and film director Krzysztof Skonieczny.

2014 also marks Rubik's appearance in the Black Atlass music video to the "Jewels" track, directed by Yoann Lemoine.

In 2016, she starred in Lost Me, Mary Komasa's music video directed by Jan Komasa. Further, in 2019, Rubik directed the music video to Mary Komasa's track "Be a Boy".

Rubik was an inspiration for the main character Cane Lele in the manga "The One".

In 2020, she lent her voice to one of the characters in the award-winning animation Kill It and Leave This Town by Mariusz Wilczyński, shown widely at film festivals, including Berlinale.

=== Social engagement and activism ===
In 2017, Rubik accepted the role of Creative Consultant and Ambassador for Parley and works with the organization on global campaigns to life about ocean awareness and sustainability. In 2019, Rubik addressed the United Nations at Parley's World Ocean Day event. Together with Massive Attack, she worked on "Home of the Whale (Mayday Mix)", a track created to connect people to the oceans. A year later, she collaborated with Parley and Net-a-Porter on an issue of Porter magazine dedicated to ocean awareness.

In the same year, she directed and produced a pro bono #SEXEDpl campaign that brought up the subject of comprehensive sex education. In September 2018, she published the #SEXEDpl book for teenagers – #SEXEDpl. Anja Rubik Talks About Adolescence, Love and Sex. The book quickly became a nation-wide bestseller, selling over 200K copies, and is continuously available in bookstores. In 2018, Rubik turned her social projects into the SexedPL Foundation. The foundation quickly became one of the most successful Polish platforms providing young people, parents and adults with substantial, age-appropriate education on human rights, gender equality, reproduction and sexuality with a positive approach, emphasizing values such as respect, inclusion, equality and responsibility. SEXEDpl is recognized by the most influential global institutions such as the United Nations and UNFPA.

As Rubik stated in her interview for British Vogue in January 2021, "In 2020, the Polish government is doing its best to censor and ultimately ban sex education. The adults of tomorrow face an isolated and uncertain future without the very best community care and structured education. Our government's attack on sex education is an attack on our children and our future."

Anja presented #SEXEDpl at Oxford University and joined the Oxford Union Debate. She was a speaker, together with Dr. Christian Jessen and Dr. Ruth Westheimer, presenting the topic of pornography as a part of sex education. She was also a speaker at the Nairobi Summit, part of the International Conference on Population and Development (ICPD), with a presentation entitled "Innovative Partnerships: Harnessing Creative Industries to Tackle Stigma and Taboo". In 2018, and 2019, Rubik also appeared at the UNFPA conference in Istanbul, addressing the importance of sexuality education.

Rubik is an advocate for women's rights and widely contributes to the women's movement in Poland and actively supports the LGBT+ community in Poland.

=== Awards ===
Throughout her modelling career, Rubik received carious prizes in recognition of her personal style and achievements as a model. These include the Złoty Nos Award (2008, Pani magazine), Prix de la Moda (2021, Marie Claire), the Plejada Top Ten Award (2012, Onet) and the Elle Style Icon Award (2014, Elle). Anja is also an honorary citizen of her hometown, Rzeszów.

2018 marks an important period in Rubik's work as an activist. She was named Glamour's "Woman of the Year", and a Gazeta Wyborcza magazine "Superhero" for her #SEXEDpl campaign. The same year, Anja was further awarded with the Gwiazdy Dobroczynności Prize in recognition for her work as the founder of the SEXEDpl Foundation. Later in 2018, Rubik, as an advocate for environment causes, was also given the Elle x H&M Conscious Award.

In 2024, Rubik was awarded the Freedom of Speech Medal (Polish: Medal Wolności Słowa) at a ceremony held in the European Solidarity Centre in Gdańsk. She was recognized for her "courageous use of free speech" in her advocacy for women's rights and fight for youth access to sexual education in Poland.

== Personal life ==
Rubik and her longtime boyfriend, Serbian model Sasha Knezevic, became engaged just before Christmas 2010 in Vienna. They married on 16 July 2011 in Deià, Mallorca. In October 2015, Anja confirmed that they had separated and later divorced.

== See also ==
- List of Polish people
