= Małgosia Bela =

Polish model and actress

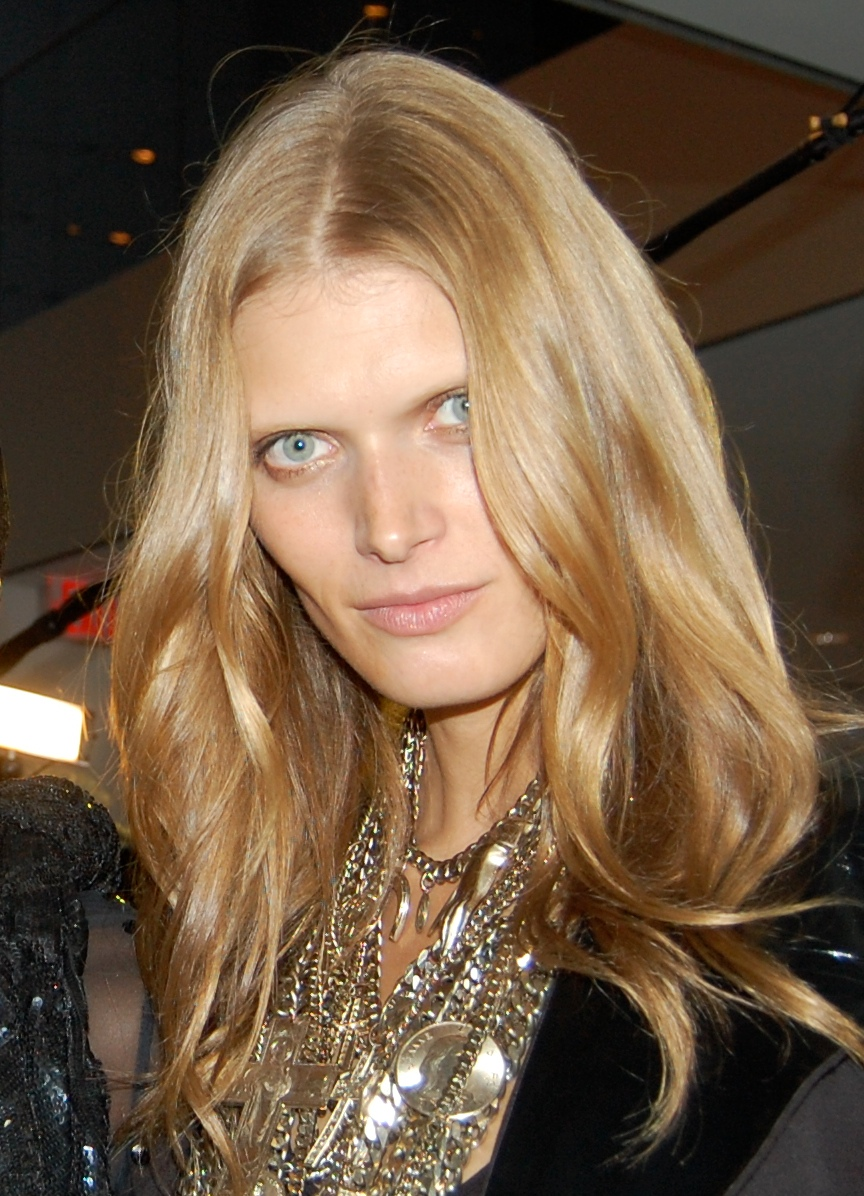
- Born: Małgorzata Bela; 6 June 1977 (age 49); Kraków, Poland
- Education: University of Warsaw
- Spouses: Artur Urbański (divorced) Jean-Yves Le Fur (m. 2013, divorced) Paweł Pawlikowski (m. 2017)
- Children: 1
- Modeling information
- Height: 1.77 m (5 ft 10 in)
- Hair color: Brown
- Eye color: Blue
- Agency: DNA Model Management (New York); VIVA Model Management (Paris, London, Barcelona); d'management group (Milan); Model Plus (Warsaw)

Małgosia Bela (born Małgorzata Bela; 6 June 1977) is a Polish fashion model and actress. She made her debut as a runway model for Comme des Garçons, Givenchy, and Balenciaga in 1998, and appeared in various photoshoots for Vogue. In 2004, she made her film debut in the Polish film Ono, and in 2018 appeared in Luca Guadagnino's remake of Suspiria.

== Early life ==
Bela was born in Kraków, Poland in 1977. She was classically trained as a pianist as a child, and later attended the University of Warsaw, where she graduated with a degree in literature.

== Career ==
Bela became a successful runway and editorial model in the late nineties, appearing on the covers of many international editions of Vogue, including Vogue Italia and Vogue Paris. Lanvin, Valentino, Jil Sander, and Versace enlisted her in their advertising campaigns.

In 2001, Bela moved on to an acting career, playing leading role in the Polish movie Stranger (dir. Małgorzata Szumowska) and the Italian/Polish production Karol: A Man Who Became Pope about the Polish Pope John Paul II.

She returned to the fashion industry in 2006, appearing in advertising campaigns for the houses of Lanvin, Louis Vuitton, Chloé, Jil Sander, Donna Karan, and Marc by Marc Jacobs, and for retailers H&M and Barneys.

She appeared in the Pirelli Calendar 2009. She made a Halloween photo session for Harper's Bazaar with photographer Tim Walker and film director Tim Burton. In April 2011, Malgosia appeared on the cover of Vogue Turkey, photographed by Cuneyt Akeroglu. Also in 2011, Małgosia took part – for the second time – in the Pirelli Calendar of 2012.

In 2023 Bela released her own part memoir, part art book titled Winter Girl.

== Personal life ==
Bela has a son, Józef (born 2004), with her first husband, Polish director Artur Urbański. She married French magazine publisher Jean-Yves Le Fur in 2013 in Italy. At the end of 2017, she married Polish film director Paweł Pawlikowski.

== Filmography ==
| Year | Title | Role | Notes |
|---|---|---|---|
| 2004 | Ono | Ewa | |
| 2005 | Karol, un uomo diventato Papa | Hanna Tuszynska | Television film |
| 2006 | Karol, un Papa rimasto uomo | Hanna Tuszynska | Television film |
| 2006 | We're All Christs | Ela | |
| 2011 | Janosik: A True Story | Maria | |
| 2011 | Without Secrets | Weronika Kasprzyk | Series; 8 episodes |
| 2018 | Suspiria | Mrs. Bannion/Death | |
| 2025 | Muse | | Short film |
| 2025 | No! You're Wrong. or: Spooky Action at a Distance | Violet | |
