= Coco Rocha =

Canadian model (born 1988)

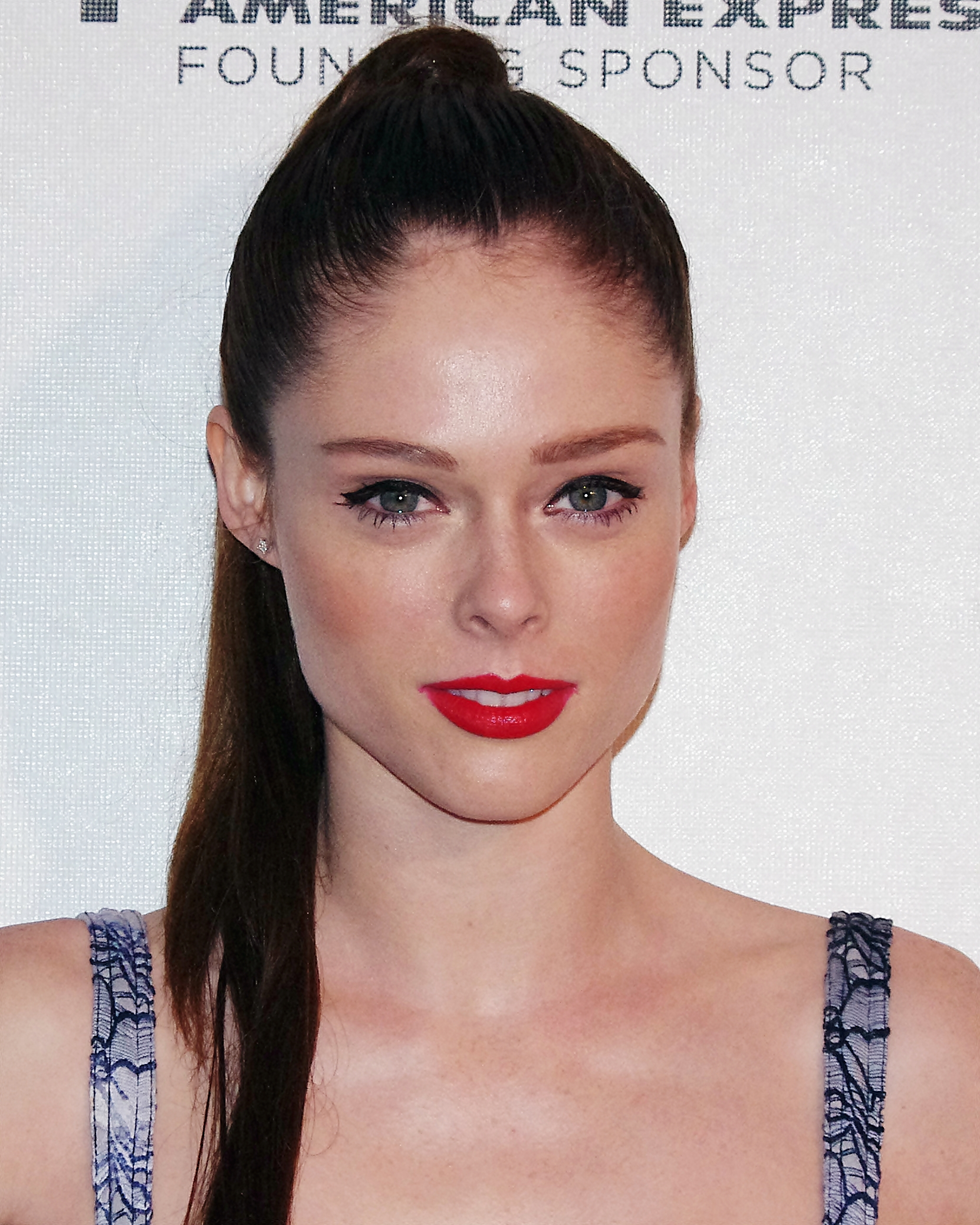
- Rocha in 2012
- Born: Mikhaila Rocha; September 10, 1988 (age 38); Toronto, Ontario, Canada
- Spouse: James Conran (m. 2010)
- Children: 3
- Modeling information
- Height: 5 ft 10 in (1.78 m)
- Hair color: Brown
- Eye color: Blue
- Agency: Nomad Management (New York, Los Angeles, Miami Beach); Women Management (New York) (Milan) (Paris); Elite Model Management (London); Uno Models (Barcelona); Modelwerk (Hamburg); Specs Model Management (Montreal); Vivien's Model Management - Sydney (Sydney); Spot 6 Management (Toronto)
- Website: www.coco-rocha.com

Mikhaila "Coco" Rocha (born September 10, 1988) is a Canadian model. She is known as the first "digital" supermodel, and is known for her advocacy for younger models. As an author, she collaborated on the 2014 book Study of Pose. Rocha is also the founder of the Coco Rocha Model Camp and co-owner of the Nomad Management Modeling Agency. In 2025, Rocha was announced as the host of the Project Runway Canada reboot on Crave.

== Early life ==
Rocha was born Mikhaila Rocha in Toronto, Ontario, and grew up in Richmond, British Columbia, where she attended Hugh McRoberts Secondary School. Her family is in the airline industry. She has two siblings. She is of Irish and Ukrainian descent.

== Career ==
=== Modeling ===
In 2002, agent Charles Stuart approached Rocha at an Irish dance competition and asked her if she would consider modeling for him. At that point, she had never thought of modeling before. When she did begin to model, her knowledge of fashion was limited. Initially Rocha spent time modeling in Asia, where she would shoot up to 75 looks a day for two months. She returned to New York and signed an exclusive contract with photographer Steven Meisel, who created a list of clients she could and could not work with. Of the time, Rocha has stated that, "the industry started to hear about this list, so when I finally got to Paris, big designers were trying to get their name on the list. It was, now looking back, one of the craziest times in my career." She became known as one of the first models to harness social media, and earned the nickname the “Queen of Pose” for her skill and creativity in posing. Meisel shot an editorial of Rocha with Gemma Ward and Amanda Moore, which appeared on the cover of the April 2006 issue of Vogue Italia.

The following March, she walked the Fall/Winter 2006 ready-to-wear show at New York Fashion Week, most notably for Anna Sui and Marc Jacobs. Backstage at the Anna Sui show, Rocha met model Naomi Campbell, who held her hands and told her she was "her new favourite model". During Paris Fashion Week, she walked for designers like Stella McCartney, Shiatzy Chen, Christian Lacroix, Emanuel Ungaro, and Marc Jacobs.

A year later, in February 2007, Rocha opened Jean Paul Gaultier's Scottish Highlands-inspired Fall/Winter 2007 show by Irish-dancing down the runway; American Vogue dubbed this the "Coco Moment" and suggested it as a sign that the fashion industry misses the "supermodels". Rocha was featured on the May 2007 issue of US Vogue with models Doutzen Kroes, Caroline Trentini, Raquel Zimmermann, Sasha Pivovarova, Agyness Deyn, Jessica Stam, Hilary Rhoda, Chanel Iman, and Lily Donaldson as the "World's Next Top Models." In 2008, casting agent James Scully said of Rocha:

I will be the first to admit I did not believe the hype, but within five seconds of meeting her, I was totally charmed and understood why everyone loves her. Some people feel her look is specific, but I find her to be the most chameleon-like of all the girls.

Rocha has been on the cover of many top fashion magazines including American, Brazilian, Italian, Japanese, Korean, Thai, Mexican and Spanish Vogue, Russian, Australian, Singaporean, Chinese, Vietnamese, Serbian, Thai, Brazilian and Mexican Harper's Bazaar, Flare, Fashion, Numéro, L'Officiel, W, Dazed & Confused, i-D and Time Style & Design, among others.

Since her debut, Rocha has been the face of a variety of advertising campaigns including Versace, Americana Manhasset, Balenciaga, Chanel, D&G, Dior, Dolce & Gabbana, Lanvin, The Gap, Ports 1961, Tommy Hilfiger, Yves Saint Laurent, Esprit, Liz Claiborne, Calvin Klein, Nicole Farhi, DeBeers, Zac Posen, Rimmel, Hermès, Fendi, Longchamp, Balmain, Christian Siriano, L'Oréal Paris, Nine West, Chaumet, Akris, Banana Republic, H&M, Area, Donna Karan, Diesel, Roberto Bravo and many more. She has appeared in editorials for American, Italian, Korean, French, Russian, Spanish, Brazilian, Japanese, Mexican, and British Vogue, British, Canadian, Czech, French, Quebec, and Italian Elle V, W, French, Korean, and Japanese Numéro, British and Japanese Dazed & Confused, i-D, Time Style & Design, and Ukrainian, Russian, Korean, and American Harpers Bazaar.

In July 2010, Rocha appeared on the Vogue website daily for an entire month in a feature named "Today I'm Wearing". The following month, Rocha appeared on a billboard in Times Square for an ad campaign with Marie Claire magazine in partnership with Project Runway in which she modeled a contestant's winning design.

In spring of 2011, it was announced that Rocha would again be the face of a limited edition Karl Lagerfeld designed Coca-Cola light campaign. She previously collaborated with Lagerfeld and Coca-Cola in 2010. In July 2011, Coco Rocha became the first high fashion model to be photographed by the Lytro Camera, the camera takes what the company calls a "living picture," meaning that it captures enough visual information in a single exposure so that the focus and zoom can be adjusted even after the picture is taken. Rocha said she reached out to the company after reading about them on the website Mashable.

In August 2011, it was announced that Rocha would be the face of an upcoming Karl Lagerfeld for Macy's collection. In mid-February 2012, Coco appeared in a commercial for White House Black Market created by New York advertising agency ceft and company new york in which she was featured tap-dancing.

In September 2014, Rocha walked for designers including Zac Posen at Spring New York Fashion Week, her tenth year working with the designer. In November, Rocha again appeared on the cover of Flare, and became the magazine's first guest editor.

=== Film and television appearances ===
Rocha appeared in The September Issue, a 2009 fly-on-the-wall documentary film about American Vogue magazine.

Rocha appeared as a guest judge on episode 8 of season 2 of the reality competition show Project Runway Canada in 2009, where the challenge for contestants was to create a dress for Rocha to wear. She hosted the 2010 MTV Video Music Awards white carpet. On October 19, 2011, she appeared as a guest judge on America's Next Top Model, where host and head-judge, Tyra Banks, referred to her as "The Queen of Posing". The short documentary Letters to Haiti featured Rocha and fellow model Behati Prinsloo delivering supplies to Haiti after the 2010 earthquake; it was shot by Rocha's husband, James Conran. The movie premiered in Toronto in October and New York in December 2011.

In 2013, Rocha was one of three coach/judges (along with Karolina Kurkova and Naomi Campbell) on the first season of the Oxygen network reality show The Face. She did not return for the second season.

In 2015, in the 9th cycle of Australia's Next Top Model, Rocha appeared in the series' ninth episode, where the final four traveled to New York. She also appeared in season 14 of Project Runway as a guest judge on a challenge where the designers took their inspiration from Finding Neverland on Broadway.

In 2022, in episode 12 of season 19 of Project Runway, the designers made an evening dress for Rocha to model and be photographed wearing (in lieu of a runway presentation). She also served as guest judge. That same year, she also appeared as a guest judge in episode 7 of season 17 of Germany's Next Top Model, a role she reprised in season 18 a year later.

In 2025, Rocha was named as the host of the Project Runway Canada reboot on Crave.

=== Writing and online presence ===
Rocha wrote the foreword to Canadian fashion reporter Jeanne Beker's book Struttin It!, about the modeling profession. In March 2011, she announced the launch of her new website said to contain almost 10,000 pictures covering her entire career as a model so far.

In April 2012, Rocha became the first high-fashion model to have more than one-million followers on the social media platform Google+. In 2014, Rocha released the book Study of Pose with photographer Steven Sebring, an encyclopedia of 1000 poses modeled by her, including those from her influences like Botticelli's Venus and Jessica Rabbit.

=== Other ventures ===
In June 2016, Rocha took a management and ownership stake at Nomad Mgmt Modeling Agency and served as the brand director for the agency. In her new role, she works with models to help them develop strategies for their career. Its roster includes Soo Joo Park, Jourdana Phillips, and Rocha herself. She also helped launch the agency's first office outside of the US, in Vietnam, in addition to opening a Los Angeles booking agency.

Rocha privately trained models entering the fashion industry, such as Kendall and Kylie Jenner, through one-on-one consultations, from which she developed the idea for a model camp. In July 2018, she opened the Coco Rocha Model Camp in a renovated 8,000 square foot property that can house about a dozen model students at a time. The program is attended in four-day sessions, instructing students on the modeling industry, and Rocha has also taught the program at Harvard University.

Rocha, along with her husband, is an investor and advisor for two web3 platforms, P00ls and FLYP. Both platforms connect creators of art and fashion with their fans through social tokens, a type of cryptocurrency used to monetize a brand.

== Activism and charitable work ==
Rocha is one of the few models who have spoken out against the prevalence of eating disorders in the modeling industry. In an open letter to The New York Times on her blog, she wrote, "How can any person justify an aesthetic that reduces a woman or child to an emaciated skeleton? Is it art? Surely fashion's aesthetic should enhance and beautify the human form, not destroy it." In an e-mail to the Associated Press, she wrote: "I'll never forget the piece of advice I got from people in the industry when they saw my new body ... They said, 'You need to lose more weight. The look this year is anorexia. We don't want you to be anorexic but that's what we want you to look like.'

In June 2011, Coco announced a partnership with Canadian-fashion-retailer Jacob for a "Photoshop-free" campaign. In her blog, she wrote she hoped the shoot could "balance the scales a little by pulling so far back from what has been the current trend of total digital model manipulation."

On October 11, 2011, Rocha appeared on Anderson Cooper's daytime television show, Anderson, where she said models are scouted too young and put under pressure to stay thin and behave unnaturally, while they are "still minors".

On November 1, 2011, she launched Coco Rocha for Senhoa, a collection produced together with Senhoa, an organization helping Cambodian survivors of human trafficking. The capsule collection contained seven unique pieces designed by her and handcrafted by human trafficking survivors. All proceeds went directly to the Senhoa program. To help raise awareness for the cause, Rocha brought in additional models Chanel Iman, Caroline Trentini, and Behati Prinsloo. In the first of two campaigns, Iman, Trentini and Rocha were photographed by Nigel Barker. Rocha also worked with The Model Alliance, to improve underage protection laws for models in New York State, noting that models did not have the same protections as other underage people in the entertainment industry. New labor protections were enacted in the state to help prevent future abuses.

== Recognition ==
In October 2010, Rocha was given Marie Claire's Prix d'Excellence as their model of the year at a ceremony in Paris.

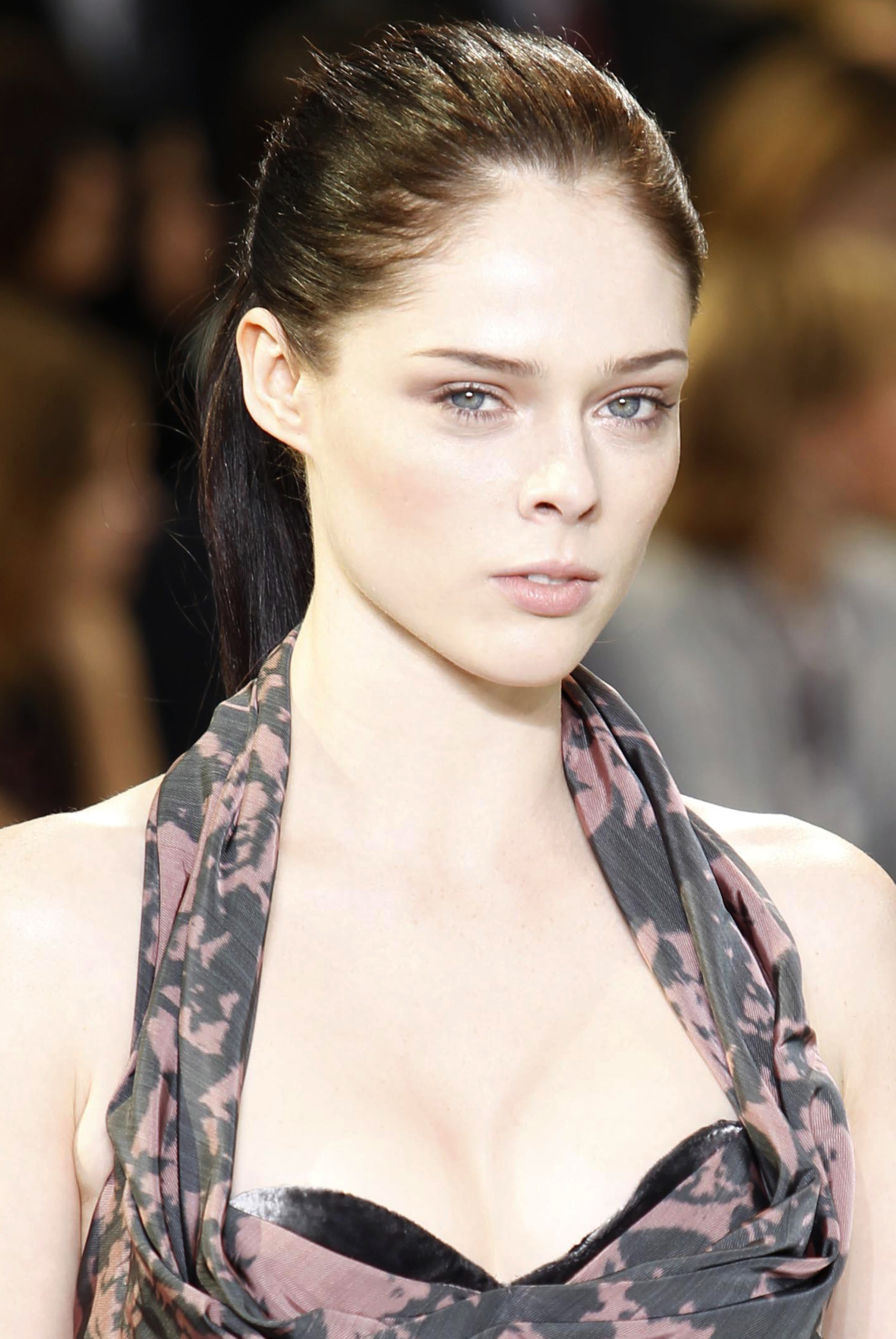
Rocha modeling for Louis Vuitton (2010)

In November 2010, she was awarded the Seventeen Body Peace award by Seventeen magazine. Rocha had contributed a number of articles to the magazine on the topic of girls' body image and self-esteem. On February 14, 2011, she was awarded the Elle Style award for 'Model of the Year' by Boy George in London.

On June 16, 2011, Rocha and husband James Conran both received awards for their philanthropic work at the Pay It Fashion Forward event in Manhattan. In 2012, Vogue Paris declared her one of the top 30 models of the 2000s.

On February 1, 2014, Rocha was awarded the "Model of the Year Award" at the Canadian Arts and Fashion Awards in Toronto, Canada. On April 24, 2014, she received the prestigious Vienna Fashion Award as Style Icon at a lavish ceremony at Vienna's Museumsquartier. In 2019, she was awarded the Identities Leadership in the Arts Award at Harvard University.

== References in popular culture ==
Rocha was one of twenty-one high fashion models mentioned in Kanye West's 2010 song "Christian Dior Denim Flow".

== Personal life ==
Rocha has been a devout Jehovah's Witness since childhood, and in a 2013 interview stated that she still participates with Jehovah's Witnesses in their practice of preaching door-to-door. She calls herself "a Christian first and a model second", and says that due to her faith she will not pose nude, with cigarettes, nationalistic emblems or religious icons.

Rocha married artist James Conran on June 9, 2010. They have three children: a daughter, Ioni James Conran (born March 28, 2015), a son, Iver Eames Conran (born April 20, 2018), and a second daughter, Iley Ryn Conran (born November 22, 2020).
