= Project Runway Canada season 1 =

Project Runway Canada
- Season 1
- No. of tasks: 10
- No. of contestants: 12
- Winner: Evan Biddell
- No. of episodes: 11

Release
- Original release: October 8 – December 12, 2007

Season chronology
- Next → Season 2

Project Runway Canada Season 1 is the first season of Project Runway Canada, a reality competition show for fashion designers that is part of the Project Runway franchise. It aired in late 2007 on the Slice channel, which had relaunched earlier that year. The season received critical acclaim, and won the 2008 Gemini Award for Best Reality Program or Series. Project Runway Canada gave Slice one of its most successful series since the launch of its new branding.

The winning designer of the first season was Saskatchewan-based designer Evan Biddell. As his prize for winning the competition among 12 designers, Biddell won $100,000 to start his own fashion line, a professional portfolio photo shoot provided by L'Oreal Paris, a retail mentorship with Winners and a cover and feature spread showing his winning collection in Elle Canada.

In 2019, Evan Biddell competed on season 7 of Project Runway All Stars against other worldwide Project Runway winners. He placed 4th.

== Season 1 contestants ==
The 12 fashion designers competing in the first season were:

- Evan Biddell, 23, from Saskatoon, Saskatchewan
- Lincoln Cheung, 26, from Montreal, Quebec
- Marie Genevieve Cyr, 25, from Montreal, Quebec
- Sofia Duncan, 34, from Ottawa, Ontario
- Megan Fischer, 25, from Calgary, Alberta
- Kendra Francis, 35, from Toronto, Ontario
- Darin Hartmann, 43, from Bashaw, Alberta
- Michael Hatley, 25, from Toronto, Ontario
- Lucian Matis, 27, from Toronto, Ontario
- Shernett Swaby, 30, from Toronto, Ontario
- Carlie Wong, 22, from Vancouver, British Columbia
- Stephen Wong, 38, from Toronto, Ontario

The 12 models competing for an Elle Canada spread in the first season were:

- Shandel Chakalall, 24
- Lauren Cummins, 24
- Shani Feldman, 27
- Ashley Hart, 19
- Renée Holford, 25
- Amanda La Magna, 17
- Joelle Litt, 25
- Chanel Michaels, 26
- Jessica Romano, 22
- Jaclyn Vens, 18
- Drea Vujovic, 23
- Gigi Young, 22

== Season 1 challenges ==
Designer Elimination Chart
| Designer | 1 | 2 | 3 | 4^{1} | 5 | 6^{2} | 7 | 8 | 9 | 10 | 11 | Episode |
|---|---|---|---|---|---|---|---|---|---|---|---|---|
| Evan | HIGH | HIGH | IN | IN | IN | IN | WIN | HIGH | HIGH | HIGH | WINNER | 11-Finale |
| Lucian | LOW | IN | HIGH | HIGH | HIGH | WIN | HIGH | LOW | LOW | WIN | RUNNER-UP | 11-Finale |
| Marie Genevieve | WIN | LOW | IN | IN | OUT | HIGH | HIGH | WIN | WIN | LOW | 3RD PLACE | 11-Finale |
| Stephen | LOW | IN | LOW | LOW | IN | HIGH | IN | HIGH | HIGH | OUT | | 10-Listen To Iman |
| Shernett | IN | IN | WIN | HIGH | HIGH | LOW | LOW | LOW | OUT | | | 9-Resort Wear Galore |
| Kendra | HIGH | WIN | IN | LOW | LOW | IN | IN | OUT | | | | 8-Splash From The Past |
| Megan | IN | LOW | HIGH | HIGH | WIN | LOW | OUT | | | | | 7-Keep A Child Alive |
| Carlie | IN | IN | IN | IN | LOW | OUT | | | | | | 6-Opposites Attract |
| Michael | IN | IN | LOW | OUT | | | | | | | | 4-The Thrill Of The Hunt |
| Sofia | IN | HIGH | OUT | | | | | | | | | 3-Passion For Fashion |
| Lincoln | IN | OUT | | | | | | | | | | 2-When It Rains, It Pours |
| Darin | OUT | | | | | | | | | | | 1-Clothes Off Their Backs |

Blue background and WIN means the designer was marked as the strongest performer and won that challenge.
Turquoise background and HIGH means the designer was marked as the second strongest performer, but did not win.
Light blue background and HIGH means the designer was marked as one of the strongest performers, but did not win.
Pink background and LOW means the designer was marked as one of the weakest performers, but was not eliminated.
Orange background and LOW means the designer was marked as the second weakest performer and was in the bottom two, but was not eliminated.
Red background and OUT means the designer was marked as the weakest performer and was eliminated.
Crimson background means the designer was eliminated, but was brought back.
Teal background and ADV means the designer advanced to the finale.
Green background and WINNER means the designer won the entire competition.

^{1} - Although Lucian, Megan, and Shernett designed in the winning collection, they did not win immunity or a prize. They were just the team with the best showing; the judges were not impressed by any of the collections.

^{2} - Marie Genevieve was eliminated in the "Dressing the Diva" episode, but then was brought back when the next challenge required splitting into teams of two. There were only seven designers, so the leftover designer (Shernett) had to choose amongst the eliminated designers to work with. Shernett initially chose Michael Hatley, but Michael then explained that she did not want to return to the show. Shernett's next choice was Marie Genevieve, who returned to the runway.

== Season 1 Fashion models ==
Model Elimination Chart
| Model | 1 | 2 | 3 | 4 | 5 | 6 | 7 | 8 | 9 | 10 | 11 |
|---|---|---|---|---|---|---|---|---|---|---|---|
| Ashley | IN | IN | IN | IN | IN | IN | WIN | IN | IN | IN | WINNER |
| Chanel | WIN | IN | IN | IN | IN | WIN | IN | IN | IN | WIN | OUT |
| Drea | IN | WIN | IN | IN | IN | IN | IN | IN | WIN | IN | OUT |
| Renée | IN | IN | IN | IN | IN | IN | IN | IN | IN | OUT | |
| Jaclyn | IN | IN | WIN | IN | IN | IN | IN | IN | OUT | | |
| Amanda | IN | IN | IN | WIN | IN | IN | IN | OUT | | | |
| Jessica | IN | OUT | IN | IN | IN | IN | OUT | | | | |
| Lauren | IN | IN | IN | IN | WIN | OUT | | | | | |
| Joelle | IN | IN | IN | IN | OUT | | | | | | |
| Shandell | IN | IN | IN | OUT | | | | | | | |
| Gigi | IN | IN | OUT | | | | | | | | |
| Shani | IN | IN | OUT | | | | | | | | |

Blue background and WIN means the model wore the winning design that episode.
Red background and IN means the model wore the losing design that episode.
Yellow background and OUT means the model quit the competition.
Pink background and OUT means the model wore the winning design that episode, but was eliminated.
Dark gray background and OUT means the model was eliminated in this episode.
Green background and WIN means the model was paired with the winning designer, and won the competition.

=== Episode 1: Clothes Off Their Backs ===
Original Airdate: October 8, 2007

13 designers meet their host, Iman, who informs them that one of them will be going home immediately. Their challenge is to create an outfit in 30 minutes with very limited materials. After one designer (Tyler Longshaw) is cut, the remaining 12 designers learn the competition has only just begun and they must now each create an innovative look using only the clothes from another competitor's suitcase. Marie Genevieve wins the first challenge and Darin and Stephen are in the bottom two. Darin is eliminated.

- Guest Judge: Arthur Mendonça
- Winner: Marie Genevieve Cyr
- Eliminated: Darin Hartmann

=== Episode 2: When It Rains It Pours ===
Original Airdate: October 15, 2007

On a trip to the park, a mass of lost and broken umbrellas is revealed as the challenge fabric. The designers race to choose the best of the broken umbrellas to create a cocktail dress. The twist is that the designers must utilize all of the fabric from the umbrellas they have chosen.

- Guest Judge: Heatherette
- Winner: Kendra Francis
- Eliminated: Lincoln Cheung

=== Episode 3: Passion For Fashion ===
Original Airdate: October 22, 2007

Faced with the challenge of creating a new look for a Bratz doll, the designers go to a party to consult with the "experts": 12-year-old girls!

- Guest Judge: Jasmin Larian
- Winner: Shernett Swaby
- Eliminated: Sofia Duncan

=== Episode 4: The Thrill Of The Hunt ===
Original Airdate: October 29, 2007

The designers have to design the season's must-have item. After a visit to a Winners flagship store, they are split into groups of three and told that they're designing a three-piece look based on a piece that they find at Winners.

The teams:

- Michael, Stephen and Kendra
- Marie Genevieve, Biddell and Carlie
- Megan, Lucian and Shernett

- Guest Judge: Shannon Johnson
- Winners: Megan Fischer
- Eliminated: Michael Hatley

=== Episode 5. Dressing The Diva ===
Original Airdate: November 5, 2007

The eight remaining designers are challenged to create a performance outfit for Canada's opera darling Measha Brueggergosman to wear during her upcoming North American tour. The twist is that Maesha is known for only singing barefoot.

- Guest Judge: Measha Brueggergosman
- Winner: Megan Fischer
- Eliminated: Marie Genevieve Cyr

=== Episode 6: Opposites Attract ===
Original Airdate: November 12, 2007

The designers are required to pair off into teams, which means one of the five previously eliminated contestants gets a second chance. Since the numbers of contestants are now odd, Shernett gets to pick a previously eliminated contestant to be her partner and re-enter the competition. She selects Michael first but it is later revealed that Michael does not feel capable of re-entering. Shernett's other choice is Marie Genevieve, who accepts. The designers must choose a pair of opposites to drive their design, but later discover that their two cohesive looks must also reflect day and evening wear.

- Guest Judge: Ian Hylton
- Winner: Lucian Matis
- Eliminated: Carlie Wong

=== Episode 7: Keep A Child Alive ===
Original Airdate: November 19, 2007

The designers are challenged to design a dress inspired by the word "hope". The final creations are to be presented at a "Keep a Child Alive" event hosted by Iman, where the dresses are bid on in a silent auction to raise money for AIDS research in Africa. Marie Genevieve's dress was auctioned for $10,000 and Biddell's dress was invited to be part of a collection. Every cent from the sale of the dress will go to charity.

- Guest Judge: Wayne Clarke
- Winner: Evan Biddell
- Eliminated: Megan Fischer

=== Episode 8: Splash From The Past ===
Original Airdate: November 26, 2007

It's a lesson in fashion history as the designers take inspiration from some famous historical looks. The fashion industry has to use their costume inspiration to create two swimsuits: one for their model and one for a plus-size model.

During model selection, the models were dressed in costume to represent the inspiration for the bathing suits. The designers picked as follows:

| Designer | Inspiration |
|---|---|
| Biddell | Geisha |
| Marie Genevieve | British Punk |
| Shernett | Flapper |
| Kendra | Marie Antoinette |
| Lucian | Gypsy |
| Stephen | Greek Goddess |

- Guest Judge: Tu Ly
- Winner: Marie Genevieve Cyr
- Eliminated: Kendra Francis

=== Episode 9: Resort Wear Galore ===
Original Airdate: December 3, 2007

The remaining five designers are challenged to create resort wear. After travelling to southern California for inspiration, they head to L.A. to meet special guest Nick Verreos from season two of Project Runway U.S. He reveals that the designers must make 2 outfits, one for their model and one for themselves.

- Guest Judge: Joe Mimran, Kimberley Newport-Mimran
- Winner: Marie Genevieve Cyr
- Eliminated: Shernett Swaby

=== Episode 10: Listen To Iman ===
Original Airdate: December 10, 2007

In the final challenge that will determine which three finalists will compete at L’Oréal Fashion Week, the four remaining designers are tasked with designing an outfit for Iman. The winning design will be worn by Iman at the fashion show finale.

- Guest Judge: Robin Kay
- Winner: Lucian Matis
- Eliminated: Stephen Wong

=== Episode 11: Finale ===
Original Airdate: December 17, 2007

The three finalists show their collections at L’Oréal Fashion Week in Toronto to determine the winner of the first Project Runway Canada.

- Guest Judge: None
- Winner of Project Runway Canada: Evan Biddell
- Winner of Fashion Model Competition: Ashley Hart

== Judges ==
- Iman
- Brian Bailey (mentor)
- Shawn Hewson
- Rita Silvan
