= The Fashion Show (American TV series) =

- Genre: Reality television
- Created by: Eli Holzman
- Starring: Isaac Mizrahi; Fern Mallis (season 1); Kelly Rowland (season 1); Iman (season 2); Laura Brown (season 2)
- Country of origin: United States
- Original language: English
- No. of seasons: 2
- No. of episodes: 22

Production
- Running time: 42 minutes
- Production company: Left/Right Productions

Original release
- Network: Bravo
- Release: May 7, 2009 – January 25, 2011

The Fashion Show: Ultimate Collection (originally styled as The Fashion Show) is an American reality television series that premiered on May 7, 2009, on the Bravo cable network. The show focuses on fashion design and features hosts fashion designer Isaac Mizrahi and supermodel Iman. The contestants compete against each other to create the best clothes. They are restricted in time, materials, and theme; the resulting designs are judged and one or more designers is eliminated each week. The show was originally co-hosted by singer Kelly Rowland; she was replaced by Iman in Season 2.

It replaced Bravo's first fashion-competition TV show Project Runway, following its move to Lifetime. Internationally the show was broadcast on Dutch television RTL 5 and was broadcast on British Pay-TV channel Really. Bravo made no move to renew the show after the second season ended on 25 January 2011.

== Format ==
=== Season 1 ===
Season 1 features Kelly Rowland and Isaac Mizrahi as hosts. The hosts are also judges and are joined by Fern Mallis and Laura Brown in the judging panel.

Fifteen designers compete to win $125,000 and have their fashions sold in retail. America chose the winner as these designers were presented with challenges that tested their skill.

=== Season 2 ===
New host Iman (who had previously hosted the Canadian edition of Project Runway), returning host Isaac Mizrahi (who would go on to judge Project Runway's All-Star season), and returning judge Laura Brown of Harper's Bazaar gathered together as the second season introduced a new format. The contestants are split up into two fashion "houses". Each fashion house is expected to assemble a cohesive fashion show for each episode, from the ground up, including everything from the lighting, music, the set, and the fashions.

Simply called The Fashion Show during the show's first season, the second season's restyled title is The Fashion Show: Ultimate Collection.

Season 2 premiered on November 9 at 10:00 pm/9:00 pm central, and features 12 designers competing to create the ultimate collection and for the chance to win $125,000 provided by TRESemme Professional Hair Care.

== Season 1 contestants ==
Contestant	Outcome
Jonny Day	14th Place
Kristin Hassan	13th Place (quit)
Laura Dawson	12th Place
Markus Ketty	11th Place
Andrew Christian	10th Place
Keith Lissner	9th Place
Angel Chang	8th Place
Lidia Amirova	7th Place
Haven Howell	6th Place
Merlin Castell	5th Place
Johnny Rodriguez	4th Place
Reco Chapple	3rd Place
James-Paul Ancheta	2nd Runner-up
Daniella Kallmayer	1st Runner-up
Anna McCraney	Winner

== Season 1 challenges ==
Episode number	1	2	3	4	5	6	7	8	9	10
Mini- Challenge winner(s)	Johnny R. Keith; Merlin	Angel; James-Paul; Lidia; Merlin	Lidia^{1}	Johnny R.^{2}	Daniella	Daniella	Johnny R. Merlin	Anna	Anna	Daniella

Designer elimination progress
Main Challenge	1	2	3	4	5	6	7^{3}	8	9	10	11^{4}	12	Title
Anna	SAFE^{2}	HIGH	HIGH	SAFE	SAFE	SAFE	**WIN**	HIGH	**WIN**	HIGH	FINALIST	**WINNER**	12 - Finale—Part 2.
Daniella	SAFE^{1}	**WIN**	SAFE^{1}	HIGH	**WIN**	SAFE	LOW	HIGH	SAFE	**WIN**	FINALIST	RUNNER-UP	12 - Finale—Part 2.
James-Paul	**WIN**	SAFE	SAFE	SAFE	SAFE	SAFE	LOW	SAFE	LOW	LOW	FINALIST	RUNNER-UP	12 - Finale—Part 2.
Reco	SAFE	SAFE^{2}	SAFE^{2}	**WIN**	HIGH	SAFE	LOW	LOW	HIGH	SAFE	OUT		11 - Finale—Part 1.
Johnny R.	SAFE	LOW	SAFE^{2}	SAFE	SAFE	LOW	HIGH	**WIN**	SAFE	OUT			10 - Blood, Sweat and Sparkle.
Merlin	HIGH	SAFE	SAFE	SAFE	LOW	**WIN**	HIGH	SAFE	OUT				9 - It's In the Cards.
Haven	SAFE	SAFE^{2}	LOW	SAFE	SAFE	HIGH	**WIN**	OUT					8 - Ode to La Mode.
Lidia	SAFE^{1}	SAFE	SAFE	LOW	SAFE	SAFE	OUT						7 - On the Job.
Angel	SAFE^{1}	SAFE	SAFE	HIGH	LOW	OUT							6 - Mean Girls.
Keith	SAFE^{2}	SAFE^{1}	SAFE^{1}	SAFE	OUT								5 - Shape Shifters.
Andrew	SAFE^{2}	SAFE^{1}	**WIN**	OUT									4 - The Shoe Must Go On.
Markus	SAFE	LOW	OUT										3 - Trick Up Your Sleeve.
Laura	SAFE	OUT											2 - All The Bang, Half The Bucks.
Kristin	LOW	QUIT											2 - All The Bang, Half The Bucks.
Jonny D.	OUT												1 - Must Have Style.

- **^Note 1**: Team 1, consisting of Angel, James-Paul, Lidia, Merlin are selected as the top team. But Lidia is chosen as the individual winner of this challenge and wins an immunity.
- **^Note 2**: Team 3, consisting of Haven, Johnny R., and Reco, are selected as the top team. But Johnny R. is chosen as the individual winner of this challenge.
- **^Note 3**: The remaining eight contestants are separated into four teams consisting of: Anna & Haven; Johnny R. & Merlin; Lidia & James-Paul; and Daniella & Reco. The four teams each create one outfit.
- **^Note 4**: The remaining four contestants presented an entire collection on the runway from which the judges choose three to be voted upon by the show's viewers.

(WINNER) Designer was chosen by viewers as the winner of The Fashion Show.
[(1ST) RUNNER-UP] Designer came in second place in the votes.
[(2ND) RUNNER-UP] Designer came in third place in the votes.
(FINALIST) Designer was selected by judges as a finalist to be voted on by viewers.
(WIN) Designer was selected by judges as the winner of the challenge.
(HIGH) Designer had one of the best designs determined by fashion show audience.
(LOW) Designer had one of the worst designs determined by fashion show audience.
(LOW) Designer was in the bottom two.
(OUT) Designer was eliminated.
(QUIT) Designer voluntarily left the competition.
(SAFE) Designer was declared safe; team was in the middle of the pack.
[SAFE^{1}] Designer was on the winning team.
[SAFE^{2}] Designer was on the losing team.

Teams^{6}
Designer	Week 1	Week 2	Week 3
Anna	Team 2	**Team 2**	Team 2
Daniella	Team 1	Team 2	**Team 2**
James-Paul	Team 1	**Team 1**	Team 1
Reco	Team 3	Team 3	**Team 3**
Johnny R.	**Team 3**	Team 3	Team 3
Merlin	**Team 1**	Team 1	Team 1
Haven	Team 3	**Team 3**	Team 3
Lidia	Team 1	Team 1	**Team 1**
Angel	Team 1	Team 1	Team 1
Keith	**Team 2**	Team 2	Team 2
Andrew	Team 2	Team 2	Team 2
Markus	Team 3	Team 3	Team 3
Laura	Team 3	Team 3	
Kristin	Team 2		
Jonny D.	Team 2		

- Entries in **bold text** indicate that the designer was team leader that week.
- **^Note 6**: Teams were disbanded on Week 4, thus rendering it an individual competition from there on out.

== Season 2 contestants ==
Elimination order

- Francine Simmons
- Mike Vensel (quit)*
- Tamara Jones
- Rolando "Ro" Tamez
- Golnessa Farmanara
- David Caldwell
- Cindy Ayvar
- Eduardo de las Casas
- Cesar Gallindo
- Dominique Pearl David
- Calvin Tran
- Jeffrey Williams

== Season 2 challenges ==
Designer elimination progress
Episode	1	2	3	4	5	6	7	8	9	10	Title
Jeffrey	SAFE^{2}	SAFE^{2}	SAFE^{2}	WIN	LOW	SAFE^{1}	SAFE	WIN	LOW	WINNER	
Calvin	LOW	SAFE^{2}	SAFE^{1}	SAFE^{2}	SAFE^{1}	SAFE^{1}	LOW	SAFE^{2}	WIN	RUNNER-UP	
Dominique	SAFE^{1}	SAFE^{1}	HIGH	SAFE^{2}	SAFE^{1}	WIN	WIN	LOW	WIN	RUNNER-UP	
Cesar	WIN	HIGH	SAFE^{2}	HIGH	SAFE^{2}	LOW	SAFE	HIGH	OUT		9 - Elemental Fashion
Eduardo	HIGH	WIN	WIN	SAFE^{2}	WIN	SAFE^{1}	HIGH	OUT			8 - Eccentric Glamour with Simon Doonan
Cindy	SAFE^{2}	SAFE^{2}	SAFE^{2}	SAFE^{1}	SAFE^{2}	SAFE^{2}	OUT				7 - Civil Unions
David	SAFE^{1}	SAFE^{1}	SAFE^{1}	LOW	HIGH	OUT					6 - Lost and Found
Golnessa	SAFE^{2}	SAFE^{2}	LOW	HIGH	OUT						5 - Reel to Genteel
Ro	SAFE^{1}	SAFE^{1}	SAFE^{1}	OUT							4 - Time Capsule
Tamara	SAFE^{2}	SAFE^{2}	OUT								3 - Femme Fatale
Mike	SAFE^{1}	QUIT									2 - The Human Body
Francine	OUT										1 - Iman's Career In Fashion

(WINNER) Designer was chosen by viewers as the winner of The Fashion Show.
[(1ST) RUNNER-UP] Designer placed second in the voting.
[(2ND) RUNNER-UP] Designer placed third in the voting.
(WIN) Designer was selected by judges as the winner of the challenge.
(HIGH) Designer had one of the best designs determined by the judges.
(LOW) Designer was in the bottom two.
(OUT) Designer was eliminated.
(QUIT) Designer voluntarily left the competition.
[SAFE^{1}] Designer was on the winning team.
[SAFE^{2}] Designer was on the losing team.

Fashion houses
Designer	Week 1	Week 2^{7}	Week 3	Week 4	Week 5	Week 6	Week 7^{8}	Week 8	Week 9
Jeffrey	Emerald Syx	Emerald	Emerald	Emerald	Emerald	NAMI	Diamond	Emerald	Emerald
Calvin	Emerald Syx	Emerald	NAMI	NAMI	NAMI	NAMI	Gold	NAMI	NAMI
Dominique	NAMI	NAMI	NAMI	NAMI	NAMI	NAMI	Diamond	NAMI	NAMI
Cesar	NAMI	NAMI	Emerald	Emerald	Emerald	Emerald	Platinum	Emerald	Emerald
Eduardo	NAMI	NAMI	NAMI	NAMI	NAMI	NAMI	Platinum	NAMI	
Cindy	Emerald Syx	Emerald	Emerald	Emerald	Emerald	Emerald	Gold		
David	NAMI	NAMI	NAMI	NAMI	NAMI	Emerald			
Golnessa	Emerald Syx	Emerald	Emerald	Emerald	Emerald				
Ro	NAMI	NAMI	NAMI	NAMI					
Tamara	Emerald Syx	Emerald	Emerald						
Mike	NAMI	NAMI							
Francine	Emerald Syx								

- ^Note 7: In Week 2, House of Emerald Syx was renamed House of Emerald.
- ^Note 8: In Week 7, designers were randomly paired by taking rings (diamond, gold or platinum) out of a bag.
