= Jeffrey Williams (fashion designer) =

American fashion designer

Jeffrey C. Williams
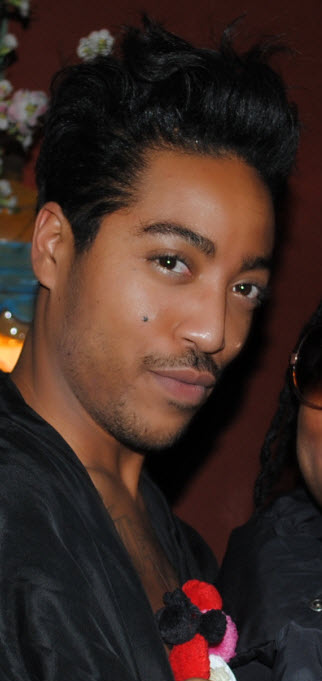
- Occupation: fashion designer
- Television: The Fashion Show Season 2 (Winner)

Jeffrey C. Williams (born in Seattle, Washington), is a fashion designer who won the second season of Bravo network's Project Runway spinoff, The Fashion Show.

== Background ==
Jeffrey Williams were born in Seattle, Washington. They were born to Jeffrey Williams and Beverly Minnis Williams and grew up in a blended family of 12 children. They are openly gay. Their gift for fashion and design was evident as young as age three, they loved the feel of fabrics, liked picking out their mother's dress up clothing. Their mother supported and inspired her prodigious son, supplying them as young as seven, with needles, thread, and fabric their first designs were pillows. By high school they had a fully equipped design studio in their home and a Jeffrey Williams prom gown was desired by their classmates. Their gift for design and style was applied to making handmade wigs for their mother during her bout with breast cancer.

Being raised in a large family that was eventually headed by one parent, they knew that the cost of pursuing fashion design would be a hard task to accomplish but after graduating from Garfield High School in 2002, they applied and was accepted in 2004 into the Fashion Institute of Technology in New York City. That same year their mother succumbed to breast cancer. She continues to be an inspiration. Their mother left their godmother, Dawn Mason (former WA State Representative) with instructions that she must see that Jeffrey complete design school, and that one day they would be famous.

== Education ==
Their talent as an illustrator was recognized by their instructors, and was selected for the highly competitive Illustration program. Then following a desire to add an international appeal to their design they competed for a coveted spot in the study abroad option. Offered by the New York Fashion Institute, they studied abroad at Politecnico di Milano in Milan, Italy, and developed a love for working as a fashion designer, internationally. Participating in many art programs to gain notoriety. In 2009, Williams graduated from the New York Fashion Institute getting a Bachelors in International Fashion Design. Soon after graduating, they began to collaborate with many other fashion designers in order to better their own individual clothing line. The designers Williams has worked with include Alexander Wang and Peter Som. They have also worked with many celebrity stylists such as Patti Wilson.

== Career ==
By the request of their older sister, Baionne, Williams decided to audition for the second season of the reality television program The Fashion Show. While on the show, they received mixed reactions from the judges. As the show progressed and their fashion designs work began to improve, and they became popular with the viewing audience they became very competitive. They won as The Ultimate Designer, beating eleven other contestants. On the series finale, they were highly praised by the show's judges Iman, and Mary J. Blige, who described this work as unique and of high value. Since the ending of the show, they have gained confidence to venture into other projects and ideas.

They traveled to India to view fabrics and designs and are now working as a fashion illustrator, a fashion consultant, and a stylist. Residing in New York, they work on their own fashion line.
