= David Sidorsky =

American professor of philosophy (1927–2021)

David Sidorsky Professor Emeritus
- Born: July 7, 1927; Calgary, Alberta, Canada
- Died: December 28, 2021 (aged 94)
- Occupations: Philosopher, Professor
- Years active: 1959-2008
- Known for: Studies on John Dewey, Sidney Hook

Academic background
- Education: New York University
- Alma mater: Columbia University
- Thesis: The Nature of Disagreement in Social Philosophy: Four Criticisms of Liberalism (1959)

Academic work
- Doctoral students: Elliot N. Dorff

David Sidorsky (July 7, 1927 – December 28, 2021) was an American professor emeritus of philosophy, who joined the faculty of Columbia University in 1959.

== Background ==
David Sidorsky was born on July 7, 1927, in Calgary, Alberta, after his Jewish parents emigrated from Lithuania. He received a BA in 1948 and MA in 1954 from New York University. He received his doctorate in philosophy from Columbia University in 1962. He wrote his doctoral dissertation on "The Nature of Disagreement in Social Philosophy: Four Criticisms of Liberalism."

== Career ==
=== Military ===
Sidorsky served in the 72nd Infantry Battalion in the Israeli Army's 7th Brigade during the 1948 Arab–Israeli War. On his way to join the army, he was held captive for six weeks in Baalbek, Lebanon. After the fighting stopped, he studied at Hebrew University, where professors included Hugo Bergman.

=== Academics ===
After visiting home in Calgary after the war and studies in Israel, he returned to New York City and taught at New York University. In 1959, Sidorsky began teaching philosophy at Columbia University, with primary interests in moral and political philosophy, as well as philosophy of literature and the 20th century philosophy and American philosophy. He also taught philosophy at New York University. Sidorsky's doctoral students include Elliot N. Dorff (1971).

=== Politics ===
In 1981, Sidorsky began an association lasting more than three decades with the Jewish Institute for National Security Affairs (JINSA) by joining its board of directors. By 1987, he had moved to JINSA's advisory board, where he remained a member until at least as late as 2011. (JINSA, is a pro-Israel non-profit think-tank, founded in 1976 and based in Washington, DC.)

== Personal life and death ==
Sidorsky was a lifelong disciple of John Dewey. Teachers and colleagues include: Frank Tannenbaum, James Goodman, Horace L. Friess, John Herman Randall Jr., J. L. Austin, and Gilbert Ryle.

Sidorsky studied Arabic.

Sidorsky appeared in the documentary Tom's Restaurant - A Documentary About Everything (2014). Eater.com described Sidorsky as "doe eyed cupid of a classics [sic] professor."

David Sidorsky died age 94 on December 28, 2021.

== Legacy ==
Rabbi Elliot N. Dorff dedicated his book To Do the Right and the Good (2004) to Sidorsky. Costin Alamariu dedicated his book Selective Breeding and the Birth of Philosophy (2023) to Sidorsky.

== Works ==
Sidorsky's works include:

Essays:

- "Contemporary Reinterpretations of the Concept of Human Rights," Iyyun
- "The Third Concept of Liberty and the Politics of Identity," Partisan Review
- "Liberty, Equality, Fraternity: Pluralist Perspectives," NOMOS
- "Modernism and the Emancipation of Literature from Morality: Teleology and Vocation in Proust, Joyce, and Ford Maddox Ford," New Literary History
- "The Historical Novel as the Denial of History: From Nestor via the Vico Road to the Commodius Vicus of Recirculation," New Literary History
- "The Uses of the Philosophy of G.E. Moore in the Works of E.M. Forster," New Literary History
- "Pragmatism: Method, Metaphysics, and Morals," German Encyclopedia of Pragmatism
- "A Note on Three Criticisms of Von Wright," Journal of Philosophy (1965)
- "Philosophy, Politics and Society," with Peter Laslett and W. G. Runciman, Philosophical Review (1966)
- "Are rules of moral thinking neutral? A note on liberty and equality," Mind 77 (1968)
- "Contextualism, Pluralism, and Distributive Justice," Social Philosophy and Policy (1983)
- "Moral Pluralism and Philanthropy," Social Philosophy and Policy (1987)
- "Razón, igualdad y el dilema de la práctica," Apuntes Filosóficos (1993)
- "Contextualismo, pluralismo y justicia distributiva," Apuntes Filosófico (1994)
- "Correspondencia" with Roberto Bravo, Apuntes Filosofico (1994)
- "Incomplete Routes to Moral Objectivity: Four Variants of Naturalism," Social Philosophy and Policy (2001)
- "Incomplete Routes to Moral Objectivity: Rationalism and Pluralism," Yearbook for Philosophical Hermeneutics
- "The Uses of the Philosophy of G. E. Moore in the Works of E. M. Forster," New Literary History (2007)
- "Sidney Hook," Stanford Encyclopedia of Philosophy (2008)

Books Edited or Introduced:

- The Alliluyev Memoirs: Recollections Of Svetlana Stalina's Maternal Aunt Anna Alliluyeva And Her Grandfather Sergei Alliluyev with David Tutaev (1968)
- The Liberal Tradition in European Thought (1970)
- The Future of the Jewish Community in America: Essays Prepared for a Task Force on the Future of the Jewish Community in America of the American Jewish Committee (1973) with Walter I. Ackerman
- John Dewey: The Essential Writings (1977)
- The Later Works of John Dewey, Volume 3, 1925 - 1953: 1927-1928, Essays, Reviews, Miscellany, and "Impressions of Soviet Russia", edited by Jo Ann Boydston (1988)
- Vision Confronts Reality: Historical Perspectives on the Contemporary Jewish Agenda (1989) edited by Ruth Kozodoy

== See also ==
- John Dewey
- Sidney Hook
- Jewish Institute for National Security Affairs (JINSA)

== External sources ==
- Philosophical Papers - David Sidorsky
- IMDB - David Sidorsky
- Center on Capitalism and Society - (Video) "The Impact of Individualism: The Age of the Individual: 500 Years Ago Today (2017)
- Toldot Yisrael (Oral history of June 1, 2021)
- Jewish Museum of Maryland (Photo 1965)
