= Project Runway Canada season 2 =

Project Runway Canada
- Season 2
- No. of tasks: 11
- No. of contestants: 14
- Winner: Sunny Fong
- No. of episodes: 12

Release
- Original release: January 27 – April 14, 2009

Season chronology
- ← Previous; Season 1 Next → Season 3

The second season of Project Runway Canada, Global's reality competition show for fashion designers, was the first season to air on the Global network, since the show stopped airing on Slice. The season premiered on January 27, 2009.

The winner of Project Runway Canada Season 2 was Sunny Fong.

== Contestants ==
The 14 fashion designers competing in the second season were:

- Adejoké Taiwo, Calgary
- Baylor Orlando, Montreal
- Brandon R. Dwyer, Barrie
- Camille Prins, Toronto
- Christie Clayton, Vancouver(deceased)
- Danio Frangella, LaSalle (deceased)
- Genevieve Graham, Vancouver
- Jaclyn Murray, Winnipeg
- Jason Meyers, Hamilton
- Jeff MacKinnon, Toronto
- Jessica Biffi, Toronto
- Kim Cathers, Vancouver
- Margarita Voultsos, Montreal
- Sunny Fong, Toronto

== Challenges ==
Designer Elimination Chart
Designer	1	2	3	4	5	6	7	8	9	10	12	Episode
Sunny	HIGH	HIGH	WIN	WIN	WIN	HIGH	HIGH	WIN	WIN	WIN	WINNER	Finale
Jessica	IN	IN	HIGH	IN	LOW	WIN	WIN	HIGH	WIN	LOW	RUNNER-UP	Finale
Jason	LOW	WIN	HIGH	IN	HIGH	LOW	OUT		WIN	HIGH	3RD PLACE	Finale
Genevieve	IN	IN	IN	HIGH	IN	LOW	HIGH	OUT	WIN	OUT		From Boardroom to Bedroom
Adejoké	WIN	LOW	IN	LOW	HIGH	HIGH	LOW	HIGH	OUT			Gimme Shelter
Kim	HIGH	IN	IN	LOW	LOW	IN	LOW	LOW	OUT			Gimme Shelter
Jeff	IN	LOW	LOW	IN	IN	OUT						Hope Springs Eternal
Baylor	IN	IN	WIN	HIGH	OUT							Something Old, Something New
Brandon	IN	LOW	IN	OUT								Re-Fashioning the Houses
Christie	LOW	IN	OUT									Colour Me Right
Margarita	IN	OUT										Claim to Fame
Camille	OUT											Fashion is a Battlefield
Danio	WD											Fashion is a Battlefield
Jaclyn	WD											Fashion is a Battlefield

Blue background and WIN means the designer was marked as the strongest performer and won that challenge.
Turquoise background and HIGH means the designer was marked as the second strongest performer but did not win.
Light blue background and HIGH means the designer was marked as one of the strongest performers but did not win.
Pink background and LOW means the designer was marked as one of the weakest performers, but was not eliminated.
Orange background and LOW means the designer was marked as the second weakest performer and in the bottom two for that challenge, but was not eliminated.
Red background and OUT means the designer was marked as the weakest performer and was out of the competition.
Crimson background means the designer was eliminated, but was brought back.
Teal background and ADV means the designer advanced to Fashion Week.
Green background and WIN means the designer won the entire competition.
Yellow background and WD means the designer withdrew from the competition.

Note 1: Although being on the winning team, the judges did not like Adejoke's look. Inversely, despite being on the losing team, the judges liked Baylor's look.
Note 2: Genevieve and Jason, after previously being eliminated, were brought back in Episode 9 with the requirement that their team had to win the challenge in order for them to remain in the competition.
Note 3: Episode 11 featured the Final Three preparing their collection for Toronto Fashion Week. There was no judging or elimination in this episode.

Model Elimination Chart
Model	1	2	3	4	5	6	7	8	9	10	11	12
Tori	IN	IN	WIN	IN	IN	IN	IN	WIN	WIN	WIN	IN	WINNER
Alissa	IN	IN	IN	IN	IN	WIN	IN	IN	WIN	IN	IN	OUT
Ashley	IN	WIN	IN	IN	IN	IN	IN	OUT	WIN	IN	IN	OUT
Stephanie	IN	IN	IN	IN	IN	IN	IN	IN	WIN	IN	OUT	
Gabrielle	IN	IN	IN	WIN	IN	IN	IN	IN	IN	OUT		
Jasmine	WIN	IN	IN	IN	IN	IN	IN	IN	IN	OUT		
Ramata	IN	IN	WIN	IN	IN	IN	IN	OUT				
Elise	IN	IN	IN	IN	IN	OUT						
Cathy	IN	IN	IN	IN	IN	OUT						
Alix	IN	IN	IN	OUT								
Lauren	IN	IN	OUT									
Alyson	IN	OUT										

Blue background and WIN means the model wore the winning design that challenge.
Red background and IN means the model wore the losing design that challenge.
Gray background and OUT means the model was out of the competition.
Green background and WIN means the model was paired with the winning designer, and won the competition.

Note: The models were not used in Episode 5. The models were not used in Episode 7.

== Episode guides ==
=== Episode 1: Fashion is a Battlefield ===
Original Airdate: January 27, 2009

14 designers took part in the second season of Project Runway. They stayed in Ottawa, Ontario. For their first challenge, they were given the task of making a ground-breaking design with various camouflage prints, and the winner of the challenge would have their design displayed in the Canadian War Memorial Museum. While designing, Jaclyn, who suffers from chronic insomnia had a panic attack caused by lack of sleep. She was taken to the hospital and withdrew from the competition. The next day, Danio's legs were in excruciating pain, and after a period of contemplation he also withdrew from the competition. On the runway show, Adejoké and Sunny's design impressed, while Jason, Christie and Camille's flopped. Camille was eliminated due to a lack of vision and technical skills. After three leave the competition, eleven designers remain.

- Guest Judge: Joe Zee, Creative Director of Elle Magazine
- Winner: Adejoké Taiwo
- Eliminated: Camille Prins
- Quit: Jaclyn Murray and Danio Frangella, for health reasons

=== Episode 2: Claim to Fame ===
Original Airdate: February 3, 2009

The eleven remaining designers were charged with making a glamorous dress for a night out for Elisha Cuthbert, who would wear the winning look. Brandon had trouble coming up with a concrete idea, leading to his apparent plagiarism of Margarita's design. Margarita had trouble with her complicated design when the fabric stretched after being sewn. The two of them landed in the bottom two, she for her cheap look and he for his extremely short, figure-skater costume. Adejoke and Jeff were also criticised for their outfits as well, she for taking advantage of her immunity and he for poor fit and sad colour. While Jason and Sunny were praised for their dresses and Elisha mentioned that she would wear both of them. Margarita was eliminated after Shawn Hewson turned to Elisha Cuthbert and told her he hoped she would never wear her dress.

- Guest Judge: Elisha Cuthbert of 24
- Winner: Jason Meyers
- Eliminated: Margarita Voultsos

=== Episode 3: Colour Me Right ===
Original Airdate: February 10, 2009

The ten remaining designers were split into five groups of two:

- Sunny and Baylor
- Christie and Jason
- Brandon and Adejoké
- Kim and Genevieve
- Jessica and Jeff

After a presentation by the L'Oreal Paris team on their upcoming colors for Spring 2009, the teams were given the task of creating one day look and one glamorous evening look that matched the creative vision. The winning teams' designs and models would be featured in ad campaigns in Shoppers Drug Mart stores across the nation. From early on it was apparent that Christie and Jason were not working well together, arguing over everything from fabric choice to the complexity of the design. Jeff had planned an ambitious gown made of bias strips but ran out of time and had to glue them onto the muslin, which showed on the runway. The judges eventually chose to eliminate Christie, whose confusion and inability to produce a cohesive design proved to be her downfall, while Sunny and Baylor were recognized for their outstanding work.

- Guest Judge: Andy Thê-Anh and Anik Gagnon, Communications Director for L'Oreal Paris
- Winners: Sunny Fong and Baylor Orlando
- Eliminated: Christie Clayton

=== Episode 4: Re-Fashioning the Houses ===
Original Airdate: February 17, 2009

The nine remaining designers were split into three groups of three, each choosing a team leader and a fashion house:

- Kim, Brandon and Baylor: Yves Saint Laurent
- Jessica, Jeff and Jason: Valentino
- Sunny, Genevieve and Adejoké: Versace

The designers were then brought to a warehouse, where they were told that they would have to reconstruct three couture garments in the vein of their chosen house out of old clothing. Brandon immediately worried his teammates when he told them that he knew nothing about YSL, and Jessica had serious doubts about her leadership abilities and garment. Jason was forced to pad his model when the garment did not fit properly. In the end, Jessica's team was safe. The judges liked Sunny's team as a whole but thought Adejoké's garment was too safe, and disliked Kim's team but liked the direction of Baylor's design. Sunny was chosen for a second win in a row; the bottom two came down to Kim, whom the judges felt had led her team in the wrong direction with ready-to-wear rather than couture despite an interesting design, and Brandon, who did not seem to understand what couture meant or who the giants of fashion history were. Kim was saved for her technical skills, and Brandon was the fourth designer eliminated.

- Guest Judge: Wayne Clark
- Winner: Sunny Fong
- Eliminated: Brandon R. Dwyer

(This episode was dedicated to former contestant Danio, who died during filming of the season)

=== Episode 5: Something Old, Something New ===
Original Airdate: February 24, 2009

The remaining designers were randomly paired up with recently divorced women, and given the task of taking their wedding dresses and redesigning them into something new based on their criteria. Kim and Jeff were initially worried due to a lack of fabric, while Baylor wasn't sure how to use his fabric. Jason sewed the name of his client's son inside her jacket as a special touch. Despite barely changing the garment, Jeff was deemed safe, as well as Genevieve. After an emotional outburst on the runway, Kim called Jeff out but Iman disagreed with her. Kim and Jason teamed up on Jeff in the waiting room. Sunny earned his third win in a row, while Baylor's poor use of a good fabric got him cut in a shocking elimination.

- Guest Judge: Justina McCaffrey
- Winner: Sunny Fong
- Eliminated: Baylor Orlando

=== Episode 6: Hope Springs Eternal ===
Original Airdate: March 3, 2009

The designers, in this episode, had to make a day-to-evening dress for Winners' Spring 2009 collection with $100 and one day to put it together, and the winning design would be sold in select Winners stores across Canada. Jeff decided to try an ambitious reversible dress with hand-stitched seams and cross-stitched details. This turned out to be a bad idea as he quickly ran out of time and was forced to glue on the fabric and draw the details in marker. On the runway he initially told the judges that the designs were sewn, but after being called out by fellow designers he admitted that he drew them on. In the end, Genevieve and Jeff were in the bottom two, Genevieve because the judges felt that her design was too 'night' and not enough 'day', and that she gave them too much lip when trying to explain herself, and Jeff for his uninspired, rushed creation. Jeff was ultimately eliminated.

- Guest Judge: Nicole Gouveia
- Winner: Jessica Biffi
- Eliminated: Jeff MacKinnon

=== Episode 7: Stick To It ===
Original Airdate: March 10, 2009

The designers had to make a gown out of post-it notes. They were allowed to use fabric as a base, but no fabric was allowed to show. Instead of their regular models, the designers were paired with breast cancer survivors, as Post-It supports breast cancer research in Canada. Sunny struggled at first due to the fact that he had recently lost his father to cancer, but once again turned out an amazing design. Jessica, despite scrapping her original design in favour of a new one on the second day, won her second challenge in a row. The bottom two came down to Adejoké, whose overcomplicated design had too many details and was unflattering, and Jason, whose excessively embellished dress ended up looking simply like a pile of post-it notes walking down the runway. He was eliminated, despite a strong showing in previous challenges.

- Guest Judge: Marie Saint-Pierre
- Winner: Jessica Biffi
- Eliminated: Jason Meyers

(This episode was dedicated to Jason Meyers model Janice Bourgon. Janice died of breast cancer between the filming & airing of this episode.)

=== Episode 8: Return of the Supermodel ===
Original Airdate: March 17, 2009

The final five designers had to make a dress for Canadian supermodel Coco Rocha to wear at a New York Fashion Week event (which turned out to be designer Zac Posen's party at Balthazar), having Victorianism and the Tudors as an inspiration. Genevieve and Kim, throughout the episode, expressed discontent with Jessica's favour from the judges, while Adejoké felt uninspired by the challenge. In the end the judges loved Sunny's eclectic, inspired piece, especially after he produced something entirely different than what he had been making in previous challenges. The final two were Kim, whose over-the-top design was unflattering and poorly constructed, and Genevieve, who produced the same silhouette as in many other challenges and one that did not seem to fit the particular challenge. She was sent home for her uninspiring, tired design.

- Guest Judge: Coco Rocha
- Winner: Sunny Fong
- Eliminated: Genevieve Graham

=== Episode 9: Gimme Shelter ===
Original Airdate: March 24, 2009

The final four designers are paired off into teams - Sunny and Jessica, and Kim and Adejoké - and are surprised to learn that Jason and Genevieve are back as a team in this next challenge. Each team had to make two outfits - one avant-garde, and one a ready-to-wear - out of camping materials such as tents and thermal blankets. Jason and Genevieve had to win this challenge, or they would be sent home again. All six designers, especially Jason and Genevieve, become fiercely competitive because the designers from the losing team will be eliminated. In the end, due to the high quality of the garments, the judges awarded a tie win between the teams of Sunny and Jessica, and Genevieve and Jason. Although the judges loved Adejoké's ready-to-wear design and construction, calling it her best ever on this show, Kim's sloppy construction of her outfit got both designers eliminated.

- Guest Judge: Rachel Roy
- Winner: Sunny Fong and Jessica Biffi, Genevieve Graham and Jason Meyers (tie)
- Eliminated: Kim Cathers, Adejoké Taiwo

=== Episode 10: Boardroom to Bedroom ===
Original Airdate: March 31, 2009

The final four designers - Sunny, Jessica, Jason and Genevieve - must create a modern take on the power suit. Tensions are high in the workroom, as all the designers worry about their abilities to create a tailored suit, and Jason resents Sunny for being considered the front-runner in the competition. Each designer struggles with this challenge: Jason wrestles over changing his shoulder-less jacket when mentor Brian hints that it is too much outside the box; Genevieve has difficulty tailoring her garment because she is more adept at draping; Sunny's creativity is initially lacking; and Jessica has difficulty with the sleeves and shoulders of her jacket. While initially thrilled at being given extra time to complete their outfits, the designers are dismayed to discover that they must create a second outfit: lingerie. During judging, the judges praise Sunny's suit for its unique perspective, beautiful lines and tailoring, admire Jason's jacket, fault Jessica for the poor tailoring around the shoulders, and fault Genevieve for her dated design and poor tailoring. The bottom two are Genevieve and Jessica, and Genevieve is sent home.

- Guest Judge:David Dixon
- Winner: Sunny Fong
- Eliminated: Genevieve Graham

=== Episode 11: The Final Three ===
Original Airdate: April 7, 2009

The final three designers - Sunny, Jessica and Jason - are given six months to construct a 12-piece collection for a runway show at Toronto's Fashion Week. With eight weeks until the show, the designers are discouraged when mentor Brian criticizes their garments. However, later, with two days until the show, they are relieved that Brian approves of their collections. Their relief is momentary; the designers learn they must each create an evening gown for Cheryl Hickey that will be the thirteenth outfit of their collection, and that she will wear it while walking in the runway show. Several eliminated designers are randomly assigned to assist in the creation of the gown - Brandon is paired with Jason, Jeff with Sunny, and Kim with Jessica. Sunny utilizes Jeff's unique talent for hand-stitching; thus, Jeff redeems himself after being previously eliminated for a dress where he drew on hand-stitching with marker. Jessica is upset to work with Kim because Kim had insulted Jessica and her work multiple times; however, the tension is resolved when Kim apologizes to Jessica. Brandon and Jason's pairing appears to be a good match, until Jason decides to model the gown after one of Brandon's designs from his Fall 2009-2010 collection. Brandon mentions this development to Brian, who then demands from Jason an explanation for his pilfering of Brandon's design. The episode ends with Jason's stunned silence and the words "to be continued..."

=== Episode 12: Toronto Fashion Week (Finale) ===
Original Airdate: April 14, 2009

The three finalists showed their collections at LG Fashion Week in Toronto to determine the winner of Project Runway Canada. The judges were pleased with all three collections, but at the same time, felt that Jason's collection showed little versatility and that he had trouble with his inspiration. Jessica showed several amazing pieces. Shawn Hewson said that her first outfit was very J.Lo. The judges acknowledged her improvement throughout the show, but questioned the technical aspects of some of her designs and the cohesiveness of her collection. Once again, Sunny impressed the judges with his collection inspired by Alexander the Great, prompting Iman to call him "Sunny the Great" before the judges unanimously declared him the winner of the season.

Runway show	Song
Sunny Fong	"You're My Heart" by Lioness (band)
Jason Meyers	"Dancer" by Woodhands
Jessica Biffi	"Just the Drums" by Cole McGregor

- Guest Judge: Evan Biddell, Winner of Project Runway Canada (season 1)
- Eliminated: Jason Meyers, Jessica Biffi
- Winning Model: Tori Leach
- Winner of Project Runway Canada (season 2): Sunny Fong

== Judges ==
- Iman
- Brian Bailey (mentor)
- Rita Silvan
- Shawn Hewson

== Broadcast ==
- The show airs first on Global on Tuesdays at 10pm starting January 27, 2009.
- It is subsequently rebroadcast on Slice on Saturdays at 9pm starting January 31, 2009.
