= Mike Vensel =

American artist, photographer and fashion designer

- Known for: Art, Photography, Fashion
- Website: mikevensel.com

Mike Vensel is an American artist, photographer and fashion designer. His works explore ideas of simplicity, structure, fluidity, nature and form in various mediums including painting, drawing, sculpture, photography, video art, digital art, performance art and fashion design. Throughout all of his creative endeavors he maintains a sleek, sexy minimalist ecstatic that transcends the various mediums.

== Biography ==
Mike Vensel was born in Pittsburgh, Pennsylvania and spent most of his childhood and adolescent years in the southern United States, later going on to study Architecture in Miami. While attending college in Miami he became interested in art and began to create large scale abstract paintings and urban landscape photographs which were exhibited at Betcher Gallery and The Bakehouse Arts Complex. Vensel moved to Los Angeles in 2001 and began to study Graphic Design and Fashion Design which led to the formation of Kitten Magazine in 2004. As publisher of the magazine, he began to photograph the collections of fashion designers from around the world, which he cites as a major influence on his development as a fashion designer. In 2007 he formed his eponymous fashion label Mike Vensel which has been shown at Los Angeles Fashion Week, New York Fashion Week and Milan Fashion Week. In 2010 Vensel appeared as a cast member on Bravo TV's The Fashion Show. and formed Concept Los Angeles, a series of bi-annual fashion shows which bring art, fashion, culture and music together. Vensel currently lives and works in Los Angeles.

== Art ==
Working in a range of sizes and mediums Mike Vensel explores themes of memory, construction, decay and language with the use sticks, squeegees and handmade tools. By applying the medium with quick stroke, force and aggression he creates a look and texture that mimics natural erosion and evolution in objects. Much of his work consists of oil paintings on wood with smaller works of oil, watercolor and mixed media on paper although he has been known to create complete works digitally, sculptures, video art and performance based work incorporating live models, music and choreography.

== Photography ==
His photography explores scenic, natural and architectural settings, often with the juxtaposition of fashion models. He often depicts the models in a scene as a majestic and powerful animal derived from diorama scenes found in natural history museums. Most often taken with a compact point-and-shoot camera and natural lighting, he captures the world much in the same way the average person sees it and captures it as he feels it gives more honesty to the work and leads to a more authentic viewing experience.

== Fashion design ==
Mike Vensel is most known in fashion design, for his minimalist aesthetic and use of traditional natural materials. Each collection explores natural, cultural and architectural elements and creates a fusion between organic design evolution and futuristic ideas of a second skin. With use of organic cotton, bamboo, recycled leather and silk overstocks the brand has an ecological responsibility that goes beyond eco marketing and minimizes its footprint by producing in small quantities on demand using the most ethical practices.

== Quotes ==
"With all of the waste in the modern world it's a shame that the fashion industry dictates that we consume and destroy products season after season to suit its sales objectives”, “A much more efficient way to live in harmony with nature is to buy fashion that is timeless and requires the wearer to only change or replace items as they no longer suit the wearer or simply just wear out from use.”

"Much of the ancient Egyptians clothing, art and design was simple, elegant and used geometric principles that still apply to modern-day aesthetics."
