= Fern Mallis =

American fashion executive (born 1948)

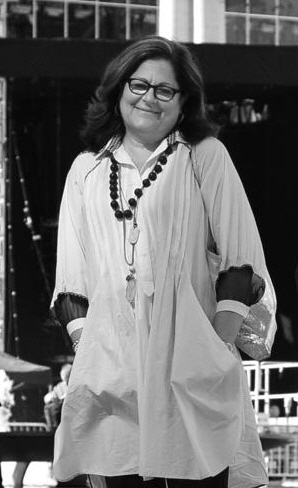
- Fern Mallis in September 2011
- Born: March 26, 1948 (age 78); Brooklyn, New York, U.S.
- Education: University at Buffalo (BFA)
- Occupations: Fashion executive, consultant
- Years active: 1970s–present
- Known for: Creating New York Fashion Week, executive director of Council of Fashion Designers of America
- Title: President, Fern Mallis LLC

Fern Mallis (born March 26, 1948, in Brooklyn, New York) is an American fashion director, who was the executive director of the Council of Fashion Designers of America (CFDA) from 1991 to 2001, and created 7th on Sixth productions or New York Fashion Week as it is known today. She was also senior vice president of IMG Fashion from 2001 to 2010. Mallis is currently president of her own international fashion and design consultancy, Fern Mallis LLC. She received her BFA from University at Buffalo.

== Career ==
During an interview with Fashion Week Online, Mallis mentioned that she was one of 20 winners of a Mademoiselle guest editing competition that she entered while attending college. She stated that she "was the only one of the 20 asked to come back and get a full-time job with the magazine." Mallis attributed that her publishing career began at the now-defunct company. The New York Social Diary stated that she "worked at the magazine for six years."

In 1993, the Council of Fashion Designers of America (CFDA), led by executive director Fern Mallis and president Stan Herman, created a centralized fashion week known as 7th on Sixth in New York City's Bryant Park. In July 2001 IMG acquired 7th on Sixth, and Mallis became Senior VP of IMG Fashion, leading new Fashion Weeks in Miami, Los Angeles, Berlin, Moscow, and Mumbai, and adding others including Sydney and Melbourne.

Mallis also served as a global "ambassador" for IMG, advising in many countries on organizing fashion events, judging fashion shows, and mentoring students. She has been widely quoted in the fashion press and featured on TV programs including America's Next Top Model, She's Got the Look, and four seasons of Project Runway; she was the weekly judge on Bravo's first season of The Fashion Show, with Isaac Mizrahi and Kelly Rowland. She was also a consulting producer for The Fashion Show and for CW's reality television series ReModeled.

While at the CFDA from 1991 to 2001, Mallis organized ten annual CFDA Fashion Awards Galas and also played a major role in starting the Fashion Targets Breast Cancer campaign, twice organized the 7th on Sale fundraiser for AIDS charities, and helped raise money for design scholarships and other initiatives.

She is a founding board member of Design Industries Foundation Fighting AIDS (DIFFA), has served on the board of the Partnership for the Homeless, for which she created the Furnish a Future program, and also played a part in creating The Heart Truth's Red Dress Initiative for Women's Heart Disease. She chaired the Sidewalk Catwalk exhibition in the Fashion District, an outdoor display of 32 mannequins created by leading designers in summer 2010.

Mallis is President of her own international fashion and design consultancy, Fern Mallis LLC, which she left IMG to form in 2010. She is on the Board of Directors for Robert Graham in New York and Tara Jewels in Mumbai, India. She is a consultant to Charleston Fashion Week and Seoul Fashion Week, and has served as Executive Advisor to Concept Korea for New York Fashion Week. She serves on a number of advisory boards, including Industrial Revolution II, and is on the Steering Committee for NYCxDesign Week.

Mallis hosts a conversation series at the 92nd Street Y entitled Fashion Icons w/ Fern Mallis, which has featured interviews with Calvin Klein, Norma Kamali, Donna Karan, Tommy Hilfiger, Tom Ford, Michael Kors, Diane von Furstenberg, Polly Allen Mellen, Marc Jacobs, Betsey Johnson, Vera Wang, Suzy Menkes, Oscar de la Renta and Cindy Crawford. She also hosts Fashion Insiders w/Fern Mallis on SiriusXM's celebrity talk channel STARS. In January 2012, she made her theatre stage debut in the Off-Broadway production of Nora & Delia Ephron's Love, Loss, and What I Wore. In February 2012, she launched a jewelry line called FERN FINDS.

== Awards ==
- The Fashion Maverick Award from the American Apparel and Footwear Association
- Woman of the Year Leadership Award from Concern Worldwide
- Fashion Legacy Award from the Fashion Chamber of Commerce State of Style Awards
- Special Award from Diversity Affluence Organization
- Leadership Award from the Fashion Center BID
- 2012 Fashion Industry Lifetime Achievement Award from Pratt Institute – presented to her by designer Calvin Klein. In May 2013, she gave the Fashion Institute of Technology's keynote commencement address and was awarded the rarely bestowed FIT President's Lifetime Achievement Award.
