= Sunny Fong =

Canadian fashion designer

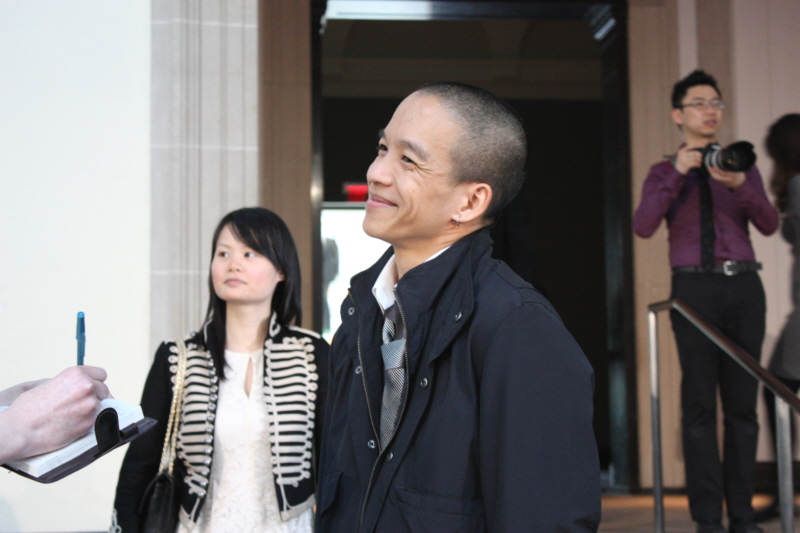
- Fong talking to reporters during Fall Winter 2010 Toronto Fashion Week
- Born: April 27, 1976 (age 50); Toronto, Ontario, Canada
- Occupation: Fashion designer
- Label: VAWK
- Awards: Project Runway Canada season 2 winner
- Website: http://vawk.ca/

Sunny Fong (born April 27, 1976) is a Canadian fashion designer and graduate of Ryerson University, who owns VAWK, a clothing brand. Fong said he developed his love of design from his mother, who made costumes for Las Vegas performers. He lives in Toronto, Ontario.

== Career ==
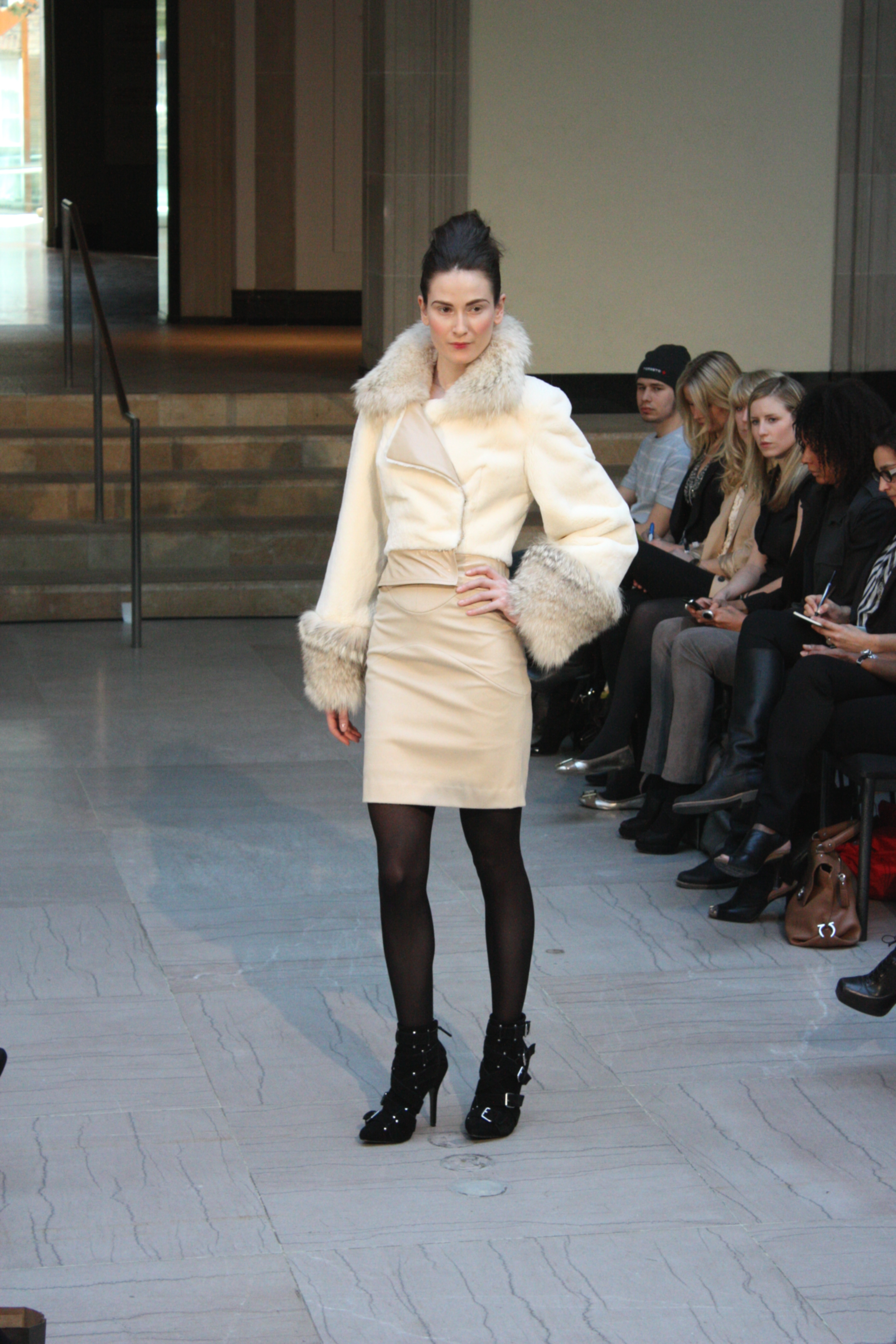
A look at the VAWK by Sunny Fong Fall Winter 2010 fashion show at Toronto Fashion Week.

In 2009, he won the second season of Project Runway Canada. His collection from this competition was showcased at LG Fashion Week. In both 2009 and 2010, Fong began the showings of his collections before the official start of LG Fashion Week, showcasing his work at Walker Court of the Art Gallery of Ontario. His 2011 spring/summer collection combined the themes of bullfighting and safari. Urban culture and Malayan mountaineering were the themes of his 2011 fall/winter collection. This collection was showcased at LG Fashion Week, in contrast to Fong's previous few seasons' off-site showings. At the following year's LG Fashion Week, Fong's spring/summer 2012 collection featured monokinis that critics from The London Free Press called "even a bit tough for the models to pull off, much less mere mortals." During the final fashion show of that October's LG Fashion Week, Fong had a model appear wearing a gold bullet bra as Madonna's "Justify My Love" played.

In 2019, Fong competed in season 7 of Project Runway All Stars, that featured international winners, but he was the first to be eliminated.

In January 2021, he was a guest judge on season 2 of the Netflix series Blown Away.
