= Lexi Jones =

American musician (born 2000)

- Born: Alexandria Zahra Jones; August 15, 2000 (age 26); New York City, U.S.
- Occupations: Artist; musician
- Years active: 2025–present
- Parents: David Bowie (father); Iman (mother)
- Relatives: Duncan Jones (half-brother)
- Website: alexandriazahrajones.com

Alexandria "Lexi" Zahra Jones (born August 15, 2000) is an American artist and singer-songwriter. She is the child of English singer-songwriter David Bowie and Somali-born American model Iman.

== Early life ==
Jones was born on August 15, 2000 at Mount Sinai Hospital in New York City to David Bowie and Iman. She has one older half brother, film director Duncan Jones (b. 1971), from her father's first marriage to American actress Angie Bowie. She also has an older half sister, Zulekha Haywood (b. 1978), from her mother’s second marriage to former American NBA basketball player Spencer Haywood.

Jones lived a private life, despite her parents' public lives. She was offered modelling jobs, however Iman rejected the offers, citing her own experiences as a model and wanting her daughter to live a private life for as long as possible. Iman went on to say "Every agency, every designer, called me to say: 'If she wants to, we'd love for her to model for us.' I said: 'No, she doesn't.' I know why they wanted her to model. It's because she is David Bowie's daughter.”

Jones had an early interest in art as a child and took classes early on, becoming more serious about her work in her mid-teens.

From ten years old, Jones began struggling with mental health issues. She began self-harming at 11 and developed bulimia at 12. After her father's cancer diagnosis in 2014, Jones started abusing drugs and alcohol as a form of escapism. Her parents staged an intervention and forcibly sent her to a wilderness therapy program for three months. After 3 months, Jones was sent to a residential treatment center in Utah for 13 months. David Bowie died of liver cancer on January 10, 2016, when Jones was 15 years old. When her father died, Jones was living at a residential treatment center in Utah. The last time she spoke to her father was two days earlier on January 8, his 69th birthday, where she said "I told him I loved him and he said it back, and we both knew". She returned home at 16 years old.

== Career ==
Jones moved to Los Angeles in 2018, working as a photographer and fashion designer. In May 2023, she launched her own website, selling her artwork. Later that year, Jones launched her first clothing range online with the slogan "ALXX".

She released her first song in early 2021. Her debut album Xandri released on April 2, 2025 independently and without advertisement. The album incorporates elements of pop, electronic, and indie rock. Jones wrote, produced, and performed all 12 tracks on the album, as well as made the cover art. The album received positive reviews. Madeleine Rousell, of The Independent, wrote "Her ability to seamlessly glide between genres suggests she has musical skills that transcend one genre." Following the release of the album, Jones spoke out about being compared to her father, noting she is "not trying to fill his shoes" rather "just trying to find [her] own peace."

== Discography ==
Studio albums

- Xandri (2025)
- Version II (2026)

== Personal life ==
Jones has been open about struggling with mental health issues throughout her life. She has spoken about using art as a coping mechanism to get out of dark places. In June 2025, she shared on Instagram that she is autistic and had been diagnosed earlier that year. At the age of 15, she came out to her mother as bisexual.
