= Surrender (1987 American film) =

1987 film comedy by Jerry Belson

- Theatrical release poster
- Directed by: Jerry Belson
- Written by: Jerry Belson
- Produced by: Alan Greisman; Aaron Spelling; Menahem Golan; Yoram Globus
- Starring: Sally Field; Michael Caine; Steve Guttenberg; Peter Boyle
- Cinematography: Juan Ruiz Anchía
- Edited by: Wendy Greene Bricmont
- Music by: Michel Colombier
- Production companies: The Cannon Group, Inc. Aaron Spelling Productions
- Distributed by: Warner Bros.
- Release date: October 9, 1987
- Running time: 94 minutes
- Country: United States
- Language: English
- Budget: $15 million
- Box office: $5,711,976

Surrender is a 1987 American comedy film that was written and directed by Jerry Belson. It stars Sally Field, Michael Caine, Steve Guttenberg, Peter Boyle, Iman, and Jackie Cooper in his final film role.

== Plot ==
Sean Stein is a successful novelist, but after two divorces and a palimony suit, he now believes women only have loved him for his money. At a charity ball where armed thieves order guests to strip, he is bound nude to a commercial artist named Daisy Morgan. He is immediately attracted to her.

Daisy is in a rather rocky relationship with Marty, a whiny, unstable lawyer who is afraid to make a commitment. Sean does not know she already has a well-off boyfriend, but he decides to play a little trick to win her. With the help of his lawyer, Jay Bass, he pretends to be a poor failure to see if she will love him for himself. As their relationship develops, he ultimately decides to reveal his true self. But on that very day, Marty persuades Daisy that he is a changed man and that they should live together in his home. Sean is heartbroken.

On moving day, Daisy accidentally sees a newspaper clipping that reveals Sean's true identity. She demands an explanation, which she accepts, telling him she realized that he is who she truly loves. However, he wonders if she only decided this after reading the article about his success and seeing his Beverly Hills home. She lies.

They elope to Lake Tahoe to be married. On the way, Sean urges her to sign a prenuptial agreement. She thinks it's "unromantic" but concedes. In a casino in Nevada, gambling by herself, she then miraculously hits a jackpot on a slot machine, winning two million dollars.

Sean returns to say he has had a change of heart and requires no prenup. Now it is Daisy who wants to know when exactly he decided this. She admits lying to him before. Marty shows up and begs her to return to him. Sean says, "You can have her."

Back in Los Angeles, realizing she has made a mistake, Daisy rejects a proposal of marriage and pays off Marty for his trouble with some of her casino winnings.

A disturbed Sean spots a prostitute who robbed him. He decides to avenge himself against women in general by bringing the prostitute to his home and robbing her; the prostitute turns out to be a transvestite. Daisy suddenly bursts in and wants to marry him again, throwing all of her remaining casino winnings at him. The prostitute picks up his gun and sees the pile of cash, but generously says, "I'll only take cab fare."

== Cast ==
- Sally Field as Daisy Morgan
- Michael Caine as Sean Stein
- Steve Guttenberg as Marty
- Peter Boyle as Jay
- Jackie Cooper as Ace Morgan, Daisy's father
- Julie Kavner as Ronnie
- Louise Lasser as Joyce
- Iman as Hedy

== Filming ==
Much of the film was shot in Stateline, Nevada in November 1986.
