= Project Runway Canada =

- Presented by: Iman Mohamed; Coco Rocha
- Starring: Brian Bailey; Aurora James
- Judges: Iman Mohamed; Shawn Hewson; Rita Silvan; Coco Rocha; Jeanne Beker; Spencer Badu
- Country of origin: Canada
- Original language: English
- No. of seasons: 3
- No. of episodes: 33

Production
- Running time: 60 minutes

Original release
- Network: Slice
- Release: October 8 – December 12, 2007
- Network: Global
- Release: January 27 – April 14, 2009
- Network: Crave
- Release: November 14, 2025 – present

Related
- Project Runway

Project Runway Canada is a Canadian television adaptation of the American reality television series Project Runway, which debuted on the Slice network on October 8, 2007. The second season aired on Global. The series' host is fashion model Iman, while Canadian designer Brian Bailey acts as the contestants' mentor. The series was canceled after the second-season finale.

In April 2025, Crave announced a revival of the series, hosted by judge Coco Rocha, joined by judges Jeanne Beker and Spencer Badu, with Aurora James as mentor. It began streaming in November 2025.

== Format ==
Project Runway Canada uses the same format as the American version of Project Runway that aired on the Bravo and Lifetime networks.

Former and recurring judges on Project Runway Canada
Judge	Season		
Judge	1	2	3
Iman Mohamed	Main	Main	
Shawn Hewson	Main	Main	
Rita Silvan	Main	Main	
Coco Rocha			Main
Jeanne Beker			Main
Spencer Badu			Main

== Series overview ==
Season	Contestants	Episodes	Originally released			Winner	Runner-up
Season	Contestants	Episodes	First released	Last released	Network	Winner	Runner-up
1	12	11	October 8, 2007	December 12, 2007	Slice	Evan Biddell	Lucian Matis
2	14	12	January 27, 2009	April 14, 2009	Global	Sunny Fong	Jessica Biffi
3	12	10	November 14, 2025	January 16, 2026	Crave	Leeland Mitchell	Charles Lu; Curtis Matysek
4	10	TBA	November 20, 2026	TBA	Crave	TBA	TBA

=== Season 1 (2007) ===
The logo during the Slice/Global era

Project Runway Canada's debut season premiered on October 8, 2007 and aired until December 12, 2007 on the Slice network. Iman, Shawn Hewson, and Rita Silvan served as judges, while Brian Bailey served as mentor. The show won the 'Best Reality Program or Series' award at the 23rd Gemini Awards. The winner of the season was Evan Biddell who won $100,000 to start a line, a portfolio photo shoot with L'Oreal Paris and a spread with ELLE Canada magazine featuring the winning model, Ashley Heart.

=== Season 2 (2009) ===
Season 2 aired on Global in January 2009 with the same panel all returning. The winner of the season was Sunny Fong, winning the cover and a feature spread in ELLE Canada with winning model Victoria, a professional portfolio photo shoot courtesy of L'Oréal Paris, a 'Runway to Retail' business mentorship with Winners, and $100,000 to start his own fashion line.

=== Season 3 (2025) ===
After a sixteen-year hiatus, Project Runway Canada was rebooted in 2025 for a third season and introduced an entirely new panel. Supermodel Coco Rocha served as host and judge, joined by fashion journalist Jeanne Beker and designer, Spencer Badu. Designer and activist Aurora James served as mentor to the contestants. The reboot premiered on Crave on November 14, 2025, produced by Bell Media Studios in association with Fremantle. Filming took place at Toronto Metropolitan University. Although this was the third season, this season is officially marketed as "Season 1" due to production changes and the acquisition of Canadian Project Runway rights by Bell Media.

The season followed the same competition structure as earlier iterations of the series: designers competed in weekly timed challenges, presented garments on the runway, and were evaluated by a judging panel, with one or more contestants eliminated each episode. The first season featured ten episodes released weekly on Crave. Episode summaries and guest judges were released by Crave and Bell Media alongside weekly episode drops.

Leeland Mitchell won and received a CAD $100,000 career investment, a feature in Elle Canada, and additional sponsor-related prizes provided through challenge integrations.

Project Runway Canada was renewed for a fourth season on March 9, 2026. The panel is expected to return.

==== Contestants ====
Twelve designers from across Canada competed in Season 3. Contestant details were sourced from the official cast announcement released by Bell Media.

Designer	Age	Hometown / Base	Finish	Outcome
Naomi Shindak		Winnipeg, Manitoba	Episode 1	12th place
Naimo Awale		Spruce Grove, Alberta	Episode 3	10th place
Christina "Taalrumiq" Gruben-King		Terrace, British Columbia	Episode 3	10th place
Tashina "Little Feather" Migwans-Odjig		Toronto, Ontario	Episode 4	9th place
Delayne Dixon	33	Kamloops, British Columbia	Episode 5	8th place
Cat Préfontaine		Montréal, Quebec	Episode 6	6th place
Rome Ramsay		Toronto, Ontario	Episode 6	6th place
Maya Ginzburg		Montréal, Quebec	Episode 7	5th place
Foster Siyawareva		Toronto, Ontario	Episode 8	4th place
Charles Lu	34	Hamilton, Ontario	Episode 10	Runner-up
Curtis Matysek		Toronto, Ontario	Episode 10	Runner-up
Leeland Mitchell		Toronto, Ontario	Episode 10	Winner

==== Progress ====
Legend:

The designer advanced to the Finale.
WIN indicates that the contestant won the challenge.
HIGH indicates that the designer was in the top two.
HIGH indicates that the contestant had one of the highest score in the challenge, but did not win it.
IN indicates that the contestant was declared safe.
LOW indicates that the contestant had one of the lowest score in the challenge, but was not eliminated.
LOW indicates that the designer was in the bottom two.
OUT indicates that the designer was eliminated from the competition.

Contestant progress with placements in each episode
Contestant	Episode									
Contestant	1	2	3	4	5	6	7	8	9	10
Leeland	WIN	IN	HIGH	LOW	HIGH	LOW	WIN	LOW	ADV	WINNER
Charles	IN	HIGH	WIN	HIGH	IN	IN	IN	WIN	ADV	Runner-up
Curtis	HIGH	IN	IN	IN	WIN	IN	HIGH	HIGH	ADV	Runner-up
Foster	LOW	IN	HIGH	IN	IN	WIN	LOW	OUT		
Maya	HIGH	IN	IN	LOW	LOW	HIGH	OUT			
Cat	IN	LOW	LOW	WIN	IN	OUT				
Rome	IN	HIGH	IN	LOW	IN	OUT				
Delayne	IN	WIN	IN	IN	OUT					
Little Feather	IN	LOW	IN	OUT						
Taalrumiq	IN	IN	OUT							
Naimo	LOW	LOW	OUT							
Naomi	OUT									

== Awards ==
In 2008, at the 23rd Gemini Awards, Project Runway Canada won a Gemini Award for "Best Reality Program or Series".
