= Social token =

Type of cryptocurrency used to monetize a brand

A social token is a type of cryptocurrency used to monetize a brand. They can be personal (or creator tokens) or community tokens. The value of a social token revolves around the brand issuing it, and are used by holders as a way to feel belonging to a certain group.

Social token are usually used by creators, as a way to monetize their personal brand. They provide creators with a means to get paid by selling the tokens, with buyers receiving special perks, such as meet and greets with the creators. The rewards associated with each token is determined by the creator.
