= Laura Brown (fashion journalist) =

Australian fashion journalist (born 1974)

- Born: May 27, 1974 (age 52)
- Occupations: Journalist; editor; producer
- Known for: Former editor-in-chief of InStyle (2016–2022)

Laura Brown (born 27 May 1974) is an Australian fashion journalist. She has been the chair of (RED)'s Creative Council since 2023. She was formerly the editor-in-chief of InStyle magazine and the Features/Special Projects and executive director of Harper's Bazaar magazine.

== Early life ==
Brown was born in Australia and is an only child. The first years of Brown's childhood were spent in Camden, a suburb in Sydney's southwest, where her father was a dairy farmer. When she was five, Brown's parents divorced and she moved with her mother Lola to Manly. Her mother worked in insurance. The pair later moved to North Sydney and Brown attended Willoughby Girls High School, where she said, "I don't think people would have even thought of me as especially fashionable."

In an interview with Matches Fashion, Brown said, "I had delusions of grandeur from a young age. I remember when I was about eight and I used to style up my bath towels into looks. I loved magazines and fashion and the glamour of Hollywood; the whole thing."

After high school, Brown went to Charles Sturt University in the regional New South Wales town of Bathurst, where she received a Bachelor of Arts in arts and communications.

== Career ==
Brown's media career began at the now-defunct Australian fashion magazine Mode where she was a production editor for two years. At age 21, Brown then moved to London for two years where she worked as a freelancer, including as a correspondent for Harper's Bazaar Australia. While freelancing in London, Brown paid her own way to Paris where she snuck into fashion shows without credentials and took photos on a disposable camera. Upon returning to Australia, Brown was employed by Harper's Bazaar Australia as a features editor, a role she held for two years.

On 4 September 2001, with US$5,000 saved, Brown moved to New York. She entered the U.S. on a foreign journalist visa and was writing for magazines outside of the U.S., sending her cheques back home to Australia for her mother to deposit into her bank account.

Brown then landed a job on Tina Brown's Talk magazine shortly before it folded. She then worked as a senior editor at W and as articles editor at now-defunct men's magazine Details. Brown joined Harper's Bazaar in early 2005 and was responsible for selecting the covers of the magazine. She produced many of the magazine's coups: from The Simpsons in Paris to fashion designers Oscar de la Renta and Diane von Furstenberg on Sesame Street. Perhaps Brown's most famous cover was the March 2015 cover featuring the singer Rihanna in a gold swimsuit inside the jaws of a shark to commemorate the 40th anniversary of the Steven Spielberg film Jaws. The cover, a recreation of a photo of Spielberg posing the same way with Jaws, was awarded Best Fashion and Beauty Cover in 2016 by ASME (American Society of Magazine Editors). While at Harper's Bazaar, Brown broke the exclusive interview with Janet Jackson after the death of her brother Michael and profiled influential women including Hillary Clinton and Michelle Obama, and also hosted two popular digital video series, "The Look" and "In and Out of Fashion with Laura Brown". Time Inc.'s 22 August 2016 media release announcing Brown's appointment to InStyle said Brown had broken many of the most newsworthy stories at her former title. "She challenged the status quo with unconventional collaborations, developing art, film and fashion portfolios with artists Takashi Murakami, John Baldessari, Francesco Clemente and Cindy Sherman, and directors Martin Scorsese, Mike Nichols, Pedro Almodovar and Tim Burton", Time Inc. said.

Of her time at Harper's Bazaar, Brown credits editor-in-chief Glenda Bailey as a mentor.

In August 2016, Brown took over the running of now-defunct 'InStyle' magazine from previous editor-in-chief Ariel Foxman, who had been at the helm of the magazine for eight years. For her first cover of InStyle, Brown used the model Emily Ratajkowski, who first came to prominence in 2013 in the video clip for Robin Thicke's song "Blurred Lines". In September 2017, InStyle featured its first man on the cover, comedian and late-night TV host Stephen Colbert. Brown interviewed Colbert herself for the special cover, which went to 100,000 subscribers. The newsstand issue featured the more conventional cover choice of Selena Gomez and these covers, Brown's first September issue, were named 'Best September Issue' by the Daily Front Row at its fifth annual Fashion Media Awards held on 8 September 2017.

The March 2018 cover of InStyle featured Oprah Winfrey who was interviewed by Brown.

In 2016, Brown collaborated with Australian handbag label Mon Purse to design a capsule collection. The three styles included in the range are "The Boss Lady" tote bag, "The Girl on the Go" bucket bag and "The Minx" evening sack. The collaboration was timed to coincide with the brand's launch in the US. Brown was introduced to Mon Purse founder Lana Hopkins through a mutual friend when she came back to Australia for a holiday, and after the pair clicked, a collaboration was born.

On 1 December 2020, Brown debuted the InStyle "Ladies First with Laura Brown" podcast where she talks to trailblazers about their historic "firsts" in the industry. She left InStyle in early 2022 when the magazine went digital only.

Brown became the chair of the Creative Council of (RED), an organization raising funds to combat HIV/AIDS in Africa, in 2023.

== Personal style ==
"My personal style is pretty easygoing, I'd wear jeans and a sweatshirt every day, if I could. It's mostly jeans, shirt, T-shirt and some sort of platform heel," Brown told The Daily Telegraph in 2016. "On grown-up days, I wear trousers with that same sort of combo. On super grown-up days, I go the full Valentino dress." In 2010, Brown said, "When I was about 20, I couldn't believe you needed more than one black pair of shoes. Times have changed. I discovered High Street shoe stores when I lived in London and when I came here it was all over. I happen to be a shoe-sample size."

Brown has revealed in interviews that she goes to Equinox and SoulCycle and that she drinks "an iced coffee no matter what the weather is".

== Personal life ==
Brown uses Instagram to promote the brand of InStyle. As of January 2018, Brown has 180,000 Instagram followers and more than 43,000 Twitter followers. Brown's Instagram feed is full of images of Australian animals such as koalas and kangaroos, and she supports Australian labels such as Zimmermann by often wearing their clothes.
