= Brian Bailey (fashion designer) =

Canadian fashion designer

Brian G. Bailey
- Born: February 15, 1958 (age 68); Alberta, Canada
- Label: Brian Bailey dresses

Brian Bailey (born February 15, 1958) is a Toronto, Ontario, Canada based fashion designer. He designs for women and has bridal and evening collections in addition to day-wear, ready-to-wear, sportswear, and plus sizes.

== Career ==
Bailey started out in the fashion business in Toronto. In 1988 he took part in Toronto Fashion Week.

In April, 2007, he went on the Canadian Shopping Channel and sold $80,000 of designer clothing in one day.

Also in 2007, Bailey acted as a mentor to young fashion designers in the reality television competition Project Runway Canada. He remained on the show for its second season.

By 2009, Bailey's fashions were sold at Saks and Harrods. His designs are currently available online at TSC.
