= Roberto Bravo =

Mexican writer

Roberto Bravo (born 11 August 1947) is a Mexican novelist and a short story writer. He is a native of Villa Azueta, Veracruz.

== Bibliography ==
- Al sur de la frontera (South of the Border)
- No es como usted dice (It's not as you say)
- Vida del Orate (Life of the Orate)
- Lo que quedó de Roy Orbison (What is left of Roy Orbison)
- De Cuerpo entero (Of Whole Body)
- Si tú mueres primero (If You Die First)
- Itinerario Inicial (First Itinerary) (An anthology of the new Mexican Narrative)
- Tierra Adentro (Inland).
- "El Infierno es un horizonte abierto" (Hell is an open horizon)
- "El hombre del diván" (Divan Man)
- "La sociedad de los moribundos" (The Society of the Dying)
- "Brisa del sur" (Southern Breeze)
- "Antología de Escritores Escoceses Contemporáneos" (Anthology of Contemporany Scottish Writers)
- " BOUND" (En colaboración con Christina McBride)
