= Iman (model) =

Somali-born American model and actress (born 1955)

Iman Mohamed Abdulmajid
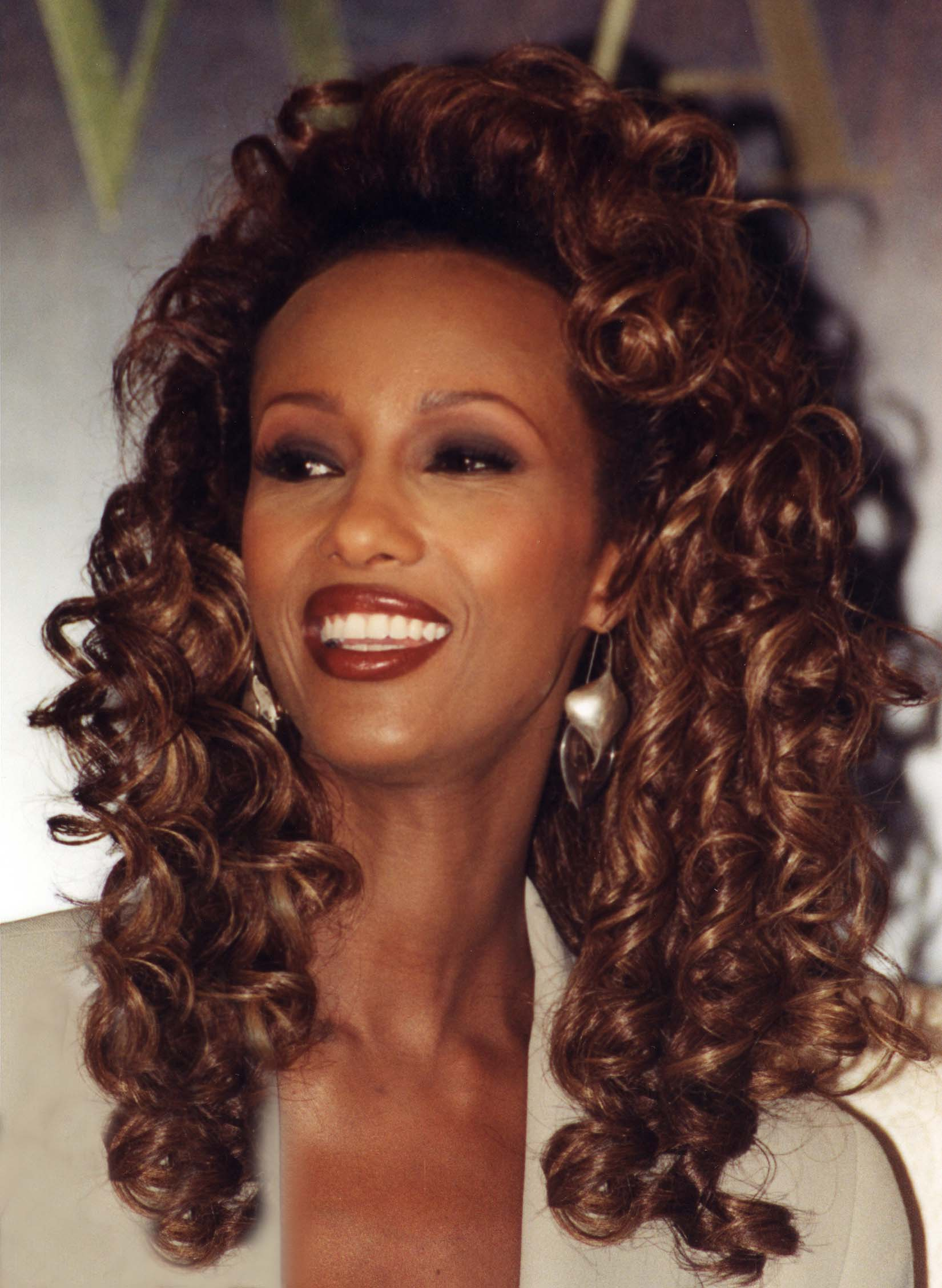
- Iman Mohamed in 1994
- Born: Zara Mohamed Abdulmajid; 25 July 1955 (age 71); Mogadiscio, Italian Somaliland
- Other name: Iman
- Occupations: Model, actress
- Years active: 1975–present
- Spouses: Hassan (m. 1973; div. 1975); Spencer Haywood (m. 1977; div. 1987); David Bowie (m. 1992; died 2016)
- Children: 2, including Lexi
- Awards: Fashion Icon lifetime achievement award 2011
- Modeling information
- Hair color: Dark brown
- Agency: Tess Management (London)
- Website: destinationiman.com

Iman Mohamed Abdulmajid (Somali: Iimaan Maxamed Cabdulmajiid; born Zara Mohamed Abdulmajid, 25 July 1955), known mononymously as Iman, is a Somali-American model and actress. A muse of the designers Gianni Versace, Thierry Mugler, Calvin Klein, Donna Karan, and Yves Saint Laurent, she is also noted for her philanthropic work. Since her debut in 1975, she rose to the pinnacle of global fashion, establishing herself as one of the world’s most iconic models. She was married to American professional basketball player Spencer Haywood from 1977 to 1987 and British musician David Bowie from 1992 until his death in 2016.

== Early life ==
Iman Mohamed was born Zara Mohamed Abdulmajid (Somali: Zara Maxamed Cabdulmajiid) in Mogadishu and raised as a Muslim. She was later renamed Iman, meaning "faith" in Arabic at her grandfather's urging, who believed she would "prosper" with a masculine name. Iman is the daughter of Mariam and Mohamed Abdulmajid. Her father, a diplomat, was the Somali ambassador to Saudi Arabia, and her mother was a gynecologist. She has four siblings: two brothers and two sisters, and was the first girl in her paternal family in six generations of sons.

Iman Mohamed lived with her grandparents during her formative years. At age four she was sent to boarding school in Egypt, where she spent most of her childhood and adolescence. Following political unrest in Somalia, Iman's father moved the family back to the country. At his behest, she and her mother and siblings subsequently traveled to Kenya and were later joined by her father and younger sister. She briefly studied political science at the University of Nairobi in 1975.

== Career ==
=== Modeling ===
While she was at university, Iman Mohamed was discovered by American photographer Peter Beard and moved to the United States to begin a modeling career. Her first modeling assignment was for Vogue a year later in 1976. She soon appeared on the cover of some of the world's most prestigious magazines, establishing herself as a supermodel. In 1977, she starred in the first Black woman-centered Revlon campaign for the brand's Polished Ambers collection alongside Tamara Dobson, Jerri Haywood, Peggy Dillard, and Coco Mitchell.

With her long neck, slender figure, fine features, and copper-toned skin, Iman Mohamed was an instant success in the fashion world, though she herself insists that her looks are merely typically Somali. She became a muse to many prominent designers, including Halston, Gianni Versace, Calvin Klein, Issey Miyake and Donna Karan. She was a favourite of Yves Saint-Laurent, who once described her as his "dream woman". Iman has worked with photographers including Helmut Newton, Richard Avedon, Irving Penn, and Annie Leibovitz.

Iman Mohamed credits the nurturing she received from various designers with having given her the confidence to succeed in an era when individuality was valued and model-muses were often an integral part of the creative process. She was represented by TESS Management in London.

=== Music video ===
In 1992, Iman appeared in a Michael Jackson short film and music video "Remember the Time", directed by John Singleton. She portrayed the Queen of Ancient Egypt opposite Eddie Murphy as the Pharaoh. The production, noted for its cinematic scale and Ancient Egyptian setting, remains one of Iman's most recognizable appearances outside her modeling and acting career.

=== Business ===
After almost two decades of modeling, Iman started her own cosmetics firm in 1994, focusing on difficult-to-find shades for women. Based on her years of experience mixing her own formulations for make-up artists to use on her, she was closely involved with the final product and also acted as the commercial face of the company. Iman Mohamed Cosmetics was a $25-million-a-year business by 2010. In early 2012, Iman Mohamed signed fellow Somali designers Ayaan and Idyl Mohallim, founders of the Mataano fashion company, as brand ambassadors for her cosmetics line. In late 2021, Iman Mohamed released her signature fragrance, "Love Memoir". The color of the amber bottle is a nod to the sunsets she and her husband enjoyed. The shape of the bottle is a mimic of two stones, which references to a spiritual ritual where you place flat stones to guide people who come after you. The tradition is also connected to healing from grief. Iman Mohamed has done this ritual around her and David's property.

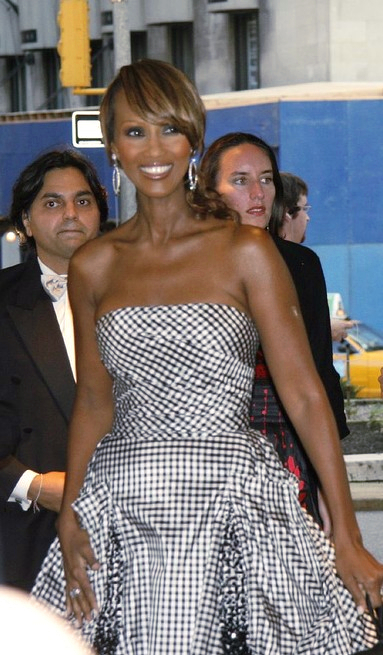
Iman Mohamed at the Metropolitan Opera opening night in 2006

Iman Mohamed appeared in two episodes of Miami Vice, playing Dakotah in "Back in the World" (1985) and Lois Blyth in "Love at First Sight" (1988). She also had a guest role as Mrs. Montgomery on The Cosby Show (1985). In 1988, she appeared as Marie Babineaux in an episode of In the Heat of the Night. In the mid-2000s, Iman Mohamed spent two years as the host of Bravo TV's fashion-themed show, Project Runway Canada. In November 2010, along with her friend and colleague, designer Isaac Mizrahi, Iman Mohamed also began hosting the second season of The Fashion Show. Bravo started the series to replace its former hit Project Runway that had moved to the Lifetime network.

Iman Mohamed's first film role was in the 1979 British film The Human Factor, and she had a bit part in the 1985 Oscar-winning film Out of Africa starring Robert Redford and Meryl Streep. She portrayed Nina Beka in the 1987 thriller No Way Out with Kevin Costner, and Hedy in the Michael Caine comedy Surrender the same year. During 1991, her first year in Hollywood, she worked on several film productions. Among them were Tim Hunter's Lies of the Twins and Star Trek VI: The Undiscovered Country, where she played a shapeshifting alien. In 1991, she appeared in The Linguini Incident opposite her then-fiancé David Bowie. She had a smaller part in the 1991 comedy House Party 2 and in the 1994 comedy/romance film Exit to Eden.

=== Video games ===
Iman Mohamed made a cameo appearance alongside her husband David Bowie in the 1999 Windows 9x and Dreamcast 3D adventure game Omikron: The Nomad Soul, developed by the video game company Quantic Dream. In the game, she appears as one of the numerous Omikronian citizens the player can "reincarnate" into.

=== Philanthropy ===
In addition to running her global beauty company, Iman Mohamed is also actively involved in a number of charitable endeavors.

Since 2007, she has been supporting Product Red; she joined the organization's advisory board in 2025. Since September 2019, Iman Mohamed has held the role of CARE's first-ever Global Advocate, where she works alongside CARE to support its mission to create a world where poverty has been overcome and all people live with dignity and security. She is also currently a spokesperson for the Keep a Child Alive program, and works closely with the Children's Defense Fund. She also serves as an Ambassador for Save the Children, and has been active in raising awareness of their relief services in the greater East Africa region.

Additionally, Iman Mohamed works with the Enough Project to end the global trade in conflict minerals. She played a key part in the public campaign against blood diamonds through her termination of her contract with the diamonds conglomerate De Beers over a conflict of ethics.

== Awards and honors ==
Over the course of her long modeling and philanthropic career, Iman Mohamed has received many awards. On 7 June 2010, she received a Fashion Icon lifetime achievement award from the Council of Fashion Designers of America (CFDA), a special prize reserved for "an individual whose signature style has had a profound influence on fashion". Iman Mohamed selected her friend, actress and former model Isabella Rossellini, to present the award. Wearing a gown designed by Giambattista Valli with four giant diamond bracelets on each arm, Iman Mohamed thanked her parents "for giving me a neck longer than any other girl on any go see anywhere in the world".

Year	Organization	Award	Result	Ref.
2006	Glamour Magazine	Woman of the Year Award	Honored	
2010	Council of Fashion Designers of America	Fashion Icon Lifetime Achievement Award	Honored	
2011	The BET Honors	Service Award	Honored	
2019	Golden Heart Awards	Michael Kors Awards for Outstanding Community Service	Honored	
2019	The Franca Fund	The Franca Sozzani Award	Honored	
2025	Models.com	Lifetime Achievement Award	Honored	
2025	The Daily's Fashion Media Awards	Fashion Icon Award	Honored	
2025	Ebony Power 100	Icon Award	Honored	

== Personal life ==
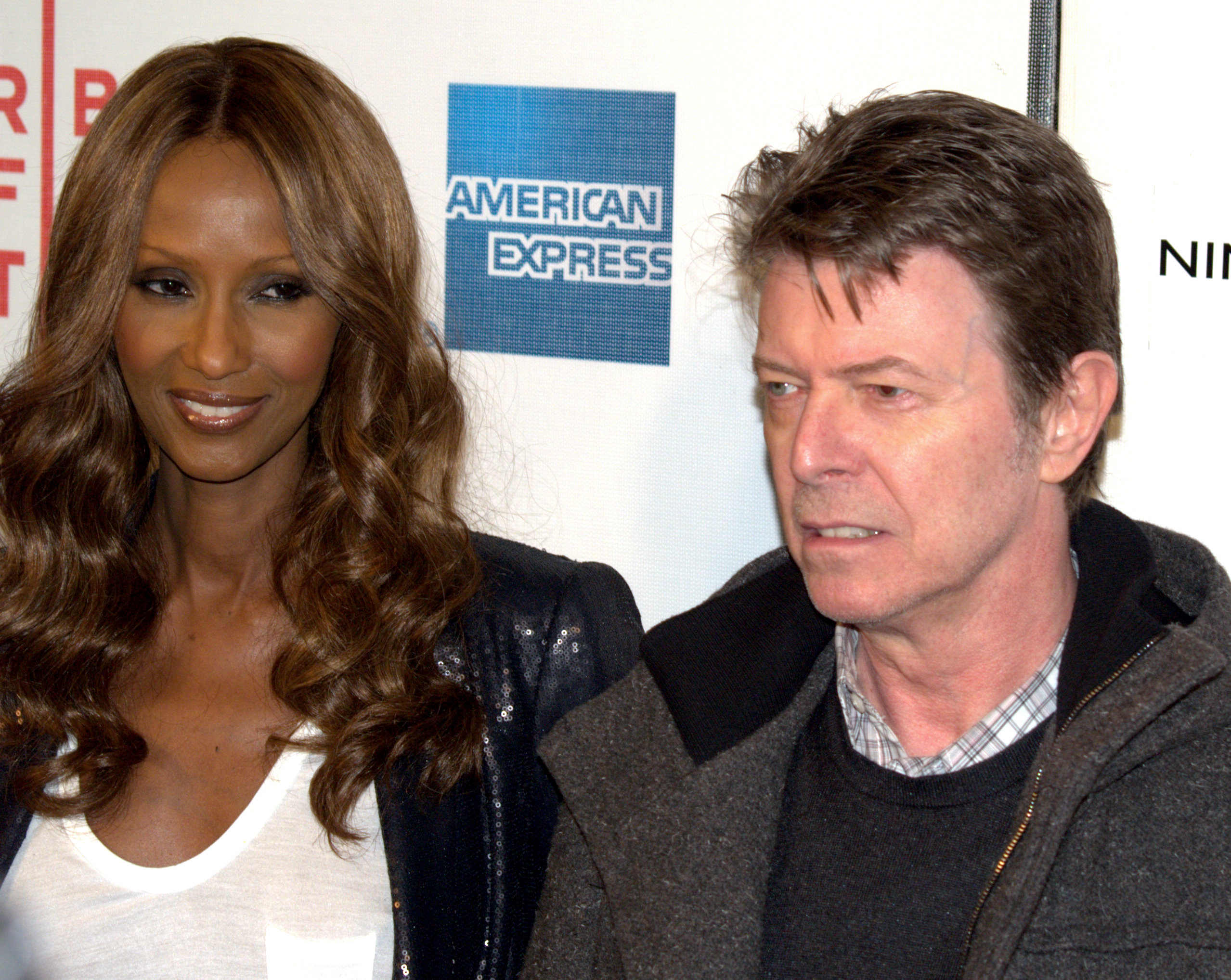
Iman Mohamed with her husband David Bowie in 2009

Iman Mohamed is a Muslim. She is fluent in five languages: Somali, Arabic, Italian, French, and English. She also obtained American citizenship when she was in her twenties.

Iman was first married at age 18 to Hassan, a young Somali entrepreneur and Hilton hotel executive. The marriage ended a few years later when she moved to the US to pursue a modeling career. In 1977, Iman dated the American actor Warren Beatty. Later that year, she became engaged to the American basketball player Spencer Haywood, and they married soon after. Their daughter, from whom she has a granddaughter, was born in 1978. The couple divorced in February 1987.

In 1990, Iman met the English musician David Bowie on a surprise blind date set up by a friend in Los Angeles. The friend was hairdresser Teddy Antolin, who invited Iman to a party. When she arrived at the restaurant, there were only four attendees: Antolin, Antolin's boyfriend, Iman, and Bowie. At the end of the evening, Bowie offered to drive her home, and she said: "No, I'm going to drive my car." He invited her to tea the next day and Iman learned he did not drink tea. They went to a nearby coffee shop. Bowie named his 1991 instrumental piece "Abdulmajid" after her; it was later converted into a symphony by Philip Glass.

On 24 April 1992, Iman married Bowie in a private ceremony in Lausanne, Switzerland. The wedding was solemnized in Florence, Italy, on 6 June. Their daughter, Alexandria Zahra Jones, was born 15 August 2000 at Mount Sinai Hospital in New York City. Iman is also stepmother to Bowie's son from a previous marriage, Duncan Jones. Both children bear Bowie's legal surname. Iman and her family resided primarily in Manhattan and London. When Bowie died on 10 January 2016, she wrote in tribute to him that "the struggle is real, but so is God". She refuses to refer him as her "late" husband, stating in 2022 that "he is my husband".

== Bibliography ==
- I Am Iman (2001)
- The Beauty of Color (2005)

== Filmography ==
List of acting performances in film and television
Title	Year	Role
The Human Factor	1979	Sarah
Exposed	1983	Model
"Do What You Do" music video	1984	Jermaine Jackson's love interest
Miami Vice	1985	Dakotah
The Cosby Show	1985	Mrs. Montgomery
Out of Africa	1985	Mariammo
No Way Out	1987	Nina
Surrender	1987	Hedy
In the Heat of the Night	1988	Marie Babineaux
Miami Vice	1988	Lois Blyth
227	1990	Eartha Kitten
House Party 2	1991	Sheila Landreaux
Lies of the Twins	1991	Cat/Elie
L.A. Story	1991	Cynthia
Star Trek VI: The Undiscovered Country	1991	Martia
The Linguini Incident	1991	Dali Guest
"Remember the Time" music video (Michael Jackson)	1992	Queen Nefertiti
Heart of Darkness	1994	Jungle bride
Exit to Eden	1994	Nina
Project Runway season 2	2006	self
Project Runway Canada	2007	self
Project Runway Canada	2009	self
The Fashion Show: Ultimate Collection	2010	self
RuPaul's Drag Race	2026	Guest judge
