= Victoria's Secret Fashion Show 2003 =

American lingerie show

- Status: Active
- Genre: Fashion show
- Date: November 13, 2003
- Frequency: Annually
- Venue: 69th Regiment Armory
- Locations: New York City, United States
- Years active: 1995–2003, 2005–2018, 2024–present
- Inaugurated: August 1, 1995
- Most recent: 2026
- Previous event: 2002
- Next event: 2005
- Member: Victoria's Secret
- Website: Victoria's Secret Fashion Show

The Victoria's Secret Fashion Show is an annual fashion show sponsored by Victoria's Secret, a brand of lingerie and sleepwear. Victoria's Secret uses the show to promote and market its goods in high-profile settings. The show features some of the world's leading fashion models, such as current Victoria's Secret Angels Tyra Banks, Heidi Klum, Gisele Bündchen, and Adriana Lima.

The Victoria's Secret Fashion Show 2003 was recorded in New York City, United States at the 69th Regiment Armory. The show featured musical performances by Sting, Mary J. Blige, and Eve. Angel Heidi Klum was wearing the Victoria's Secret Fantasy Bra : Very Sexy Fantasy Bra worth $11,000,000.

Dates	Locations	Broadcaster	Viewers (millions)	Performers
November 13, 2003 (taped); November 19, 2003	New York, United States	CBS	9.4	Sting, Mary J. Blige, and Eve

== Fashion show segments ==
=== Segment 1: Sexy Super Heroines ===
Performer	Song	Status
(United States) Danny Elfman	The Batman Theme	Remixed Recording
(Netherlands) Jaydee	Plastic Dreams	Remixed Recording
(Canada) Peaches	AA XXX	Remixed Recording

Nationality	Model(s)	Wings	Runway shows	Notes
(Brazil) Brazilians	Adriana Lima	W	1999–2003 • 2005–2008 • 2010–2018 • 2024–2026	2 Angel (2000–2018)
(Brazil) Brazilians	Gisele Bündchen		1999–2003 • 2005–2006	2 Angel (2000–2007)
(Czech Republic) Czech	Karolína Kurková		2000–2003 • 2005–2008 • 2010	
(Brazil) Brazilian	Michelle Alves	W	2002–2003	
(United States) American	Tyra Banks		1996–2003 • 2005 • 2024	1 Angel (1997–2005)
(Brazil) Brazilian	Alessandra Ambrosio		2000–2003 • 2005–2017 • 2024–2026	Fitting Model
(Estonia) Estonian	Carmen Kass		1999–2000 • 2002–2003 • 2008	
(Netherlands) Dutch	Dewi Driegen	W	2002–2003	
(Brazil) Brazilian	Isabeli Fontana		2003 • 2005 • 2007–2010 • 2012 • 2014 • 2024	Newcomer
(United Kingdom) British	Naomi Campbell		1996–1998 • 2002–2003 • 2005	

=== Segment 2: Razor Sharp Latex Ladies ===
Performer	Song	Status
(Jamaica) Shaggy	Hey Sexy Lady	Remixed Recording
(United States) Peggy Lee	Fever	Remixed Recording

Nationality	Model(s)	Wings	Runway shows	Notes
(Germany) German	Heidi Klum		1997–2003 • 2005 • 2007–2009	1 Special Angel (1999–2010); Wearing "Very Sexy Fantasy Bra" (Value: $11,000,000)
(Brazil) Brazilian	Ana Beatriz Barros		2002–2003 • 2005–2006 • 2008–2009	
(United States) Americans	Angela Lindvall		2000 • 2003 • 2005–2008	Comeback
(United States) Americans	Frankie Rayder		1999–2000 • 2002–2003	
(Sweden) Swedish	Mini Andén		2000–2001 • 2003	Comeback
(Russia) Russian	Eugenia Volodina		2002–2003 • 2005 • 2007	
(Brazil) Brazilian	Marcelle Bittar	W	2003	Newcomers
(United Kingdom) British	Jacquetta Wheeler		2003	Newcomers
(Nigeria) Nigerian	Oluchi Onweagba		2000 • 2002–2003 • 2005–2007	
(Ethiopia) Ethiopian	Liya Kebede		2002–2003	
(United States) American	Lindsay Frimodt		2002–2003	
(Brazil) Brazilian	Fernanda Tavares		2000–2003 • 2005	

=== Special Performance ===
Performer	Song	Status
(United Kingdom) Sting	Englishman In New York / Send Your Love	Live Performance

=== Segment 3 : Rock Chicks Rockin' Out ===
Performer	Song	Status
(United States) Chi-Lites	Are You My Woman	Remixed Recording
(United States) N.E.R.D	Rock Star	Remixed Recording
(Australia) • (United Kingdom) Kylie Minogue	Slow (The Chemical Brothers Remix)	Remixed Recording

Nationality	Model(s)	Wings	Runway shows	Notes
(Brazil) Brazilians	Gisele Bündchen		1999–2003 • 2005–2006	2 Angel (2000–2007)
(Brazil) Brazilians	Letícia Birkheuer		2002–2003	
(Lithuania) Lithuanian	Margarita Svegzdaite		2003	Newcomer
(India) Indian	Ujjwala Raut		2002–2003	
(Brazil) Brazilian	Alessandra Ambrosio		2000–2003 • 2005–2017 • 2024–2026	Fitting Model
(United States) Americans	Deanna Miller		2003	Newcomer
(United States) Americans	Tyra Banks		1996–2003 • 2005 • 2024	1 Angel (1997–2005)
(Brazil) Brazilian	Adriana Lima		1999–2003 • 2005–2008 • 2010–2018 • 2024–2026	2 Angel (2000–2018)
(United States) Americans	Angela Lindvall	W	2000 • 2003 • 2005–2008	Comeback
(United States) Americans	Frankie Rayder		1999–2000 • 2002–2003	
(Netherlands) Dutch	Dewi Driegen		2002–2003	
(Germany) German	Heidi Klum		1997–2003 • 2005 • 2007–2009	1 Angel (1999–2010)
(Brazil) Brazilian	Marcelle Bittar		2003	Newcomer
(United Kingdom) British	Naomi Campbell	W	1996–1998 • 2002–2003 • 2005	

=== Special Performance ===
Performer	Song	Status
(United States) Mary J. Blige and (United States) Eve	Not Today	Live Performance

=== Segment 4 : Sexy Kittens ===
Performer	Song	Status
(France) Francis Lai	Bilitis	Remixed Recording
(United Kingdom) Overseer	Slayed	Remixed Recording
(Jamaica) Sean Paul	Gimme the Light	Remixed Recording

Nationality	Model(s)	Wings	Runway shows	Notes
(Czech Republic) Czech	Karolína Kurková		2000–2003 • 2005–2008 • 2010	
(Brazil) Brazilian	Isabeli Fontana		2003 • 2005 • 2007–2010 • 2012 • 2014 • 2024	Newcomer
(Russia) Russian	Eugenia Volodina		2002–2003 • 2005 • 2007	
(Brazil) Brazilian	Ana Beatriz Barros		2002–2003 • 2005–2006 • 2008–2009	
(Estonia) Estonian	Carmen Kass		1999–2000 • 2002–2003 • 2008	
(United States) American	Lindsay Frimodt		2002–2003	
(Lithuania) Lithuanian	Margarita Svegzdaite		2003	Newcomers
(United States) American	Deanna Miller	W	2003	Newcomers
(Sweden) Swedish	Mini Andén		2000–2001 • 2003	
(Ethiopia) Ethiopian	Liya Kebede		2002–2003	
(United Kingdom) British	Jacquetta Wheeler		2003	Newcomer
(Nigeria) Nigerian	Oluchi Onweagba		2000 • 2002–2003 • 2005–2007	

=== Special Performance ===
Performer	Song	Status
(United States) Mary J. Blige and (United Kingdom) Sting	Whenever I Say Your Name	Live Performance

=== Segment 5 : Glaaaaamaaazons ===
Performer	Song	Status
(United States) Jay-Z	Dirt Off Your Shoulder	Remixed Recording
(United Kingdom) Basement Jaxx	Good Luck	Remixed Recording
(United States) Evanescence	Bring Me To Life	Remixed Recording

Nationality	Model(s)	Wings	Runway shows	Notes
(United Kingdom) British	Naomi Campbell		1996–1998 • 2002–2003 • 2005	
(Brazil) Brazilian	Adriana Lima	W	1999–2003 • 2005–2008 • 2010–2018 • 2024–2026	2 Angel (2000–2018)
(United States) American	Angela Lindvall		2000 • 2003 • 2005–2008	Comeback
(Brazil) Brazilians	Fernanda Tavares		2000–2003 • 2005	
(Brazil) Brazilians	Letícia Birkheuer		2002–2003	
(Netherlands) Dutch	Dewi Driegen		2002–2003	
(India) Indian	Ujjwala Raut	W	2002–2003	
(United States) American	Tyra Banks		1996–2003 • 2005 • 2024	1 Angel (1997–2005)
(Brazil) Brazilians	Michelle Alves		2002–2003	
(Brazil) Brazilians	Gisele Bündchen		1999–2003 • 2005–2006	2 Angel (2000–2007)
(Czech Republic) Czech	Karolína Kurková	W	2000–2003 • 2005–2008 • 2010	
(Estonia) Estonian	Carmen Kass		1999–2000 • 2002–2003 • 2008	
(Germany) German	Heidi Klum	W	1997–2003 • 2005 • 2007–2009	1 Angel (1999–2010)

== Index ==
Symbol	Meaning
1	1st Generation Angels
2	2nd Generation Angels
W	Wings

== Finale ==
Performer	Song	Status
Danny Elfman	The Batman Theme	Remixed Recording
Shaggy	Hey Sexy Lady	Remixed Recording
Chi-Lites	Are You My Woman	Remixed Recording
N.E.R.D	Rock Star	Remixed Recording
Basement Jaxx	Good Luck	Remixed Recording

Angels: Adriana Lima, Gisele Bündchen, Tyra Banks, Heidi Klum.

Returning Models: Michelle Alves, Alessandra Ambrosio, Carmen Kass, Dewi Driegen, Naomi Campbell, Ana Beatriz Barros, Angela Lindvall, Frankie Rayder, Mini Andén, Eugenia Volodina, Oluchi Onweagba, Liya Kebede, Lindsay Frimodt, Fernanda Tavares, Letícia Birkheuer, Ujjwala Raut, Karolina Kurkova.

Newcomers: Isabeli Fontana, Marcelle Bittar, Jacquetta Wheeler, Margarita Svegzdaite, Deanna Miller.
