= Victoria's Secret Fashion Show 2002 =

Annual fashion show

- Status: Active
- Genre: Fashion show
- Date: November 14, 2002
- Frequency: Annually
- Venue: 69th Regiment Armory
- Locations: New York City, United States
- Years active: 1995–2003, 2005–2018, 2024–present
- Inaugurated: August 1, 1995
- Most recent: 2026
- Previous event: 2001
- Next event: 2003
- Member: Victoria's Secret
- Website: Victoria's Secret Fashion Show

The Victoria's Secret Fashion Show is an annual fashion show sponsored by Victoria's Secret, a brand of lingerie and sleepwear. Victoria's Secret uses the show to promote and market its goods in high-profile settings. The show features some of the world's leading fashion models, such as current Victoria's Secret Angels Tyra Banks, Heidi Klum, Gisele Bündchen, and Adriana Lima. The Victoria's Secret Fashion Show 2002 was recorded in New York, United States at the 69th Regiment Armory. The show featured musical performances by Destiny's Child, Marc Anthony, and Phil Collins. Karolína Kurková was wearing the Victoria's Secret Fantasy Bra : Star of Victoria Fantasy Bra worth $10,000,000.

| Dates | Locations | Broadcaster | Viewers (millions) | Performers |
|---|---|---|---|---|
| November 14, 2002 (recorded); November 20, 2002 | New York, United States | CBS | 10.5 | Destiny's Child, Marc Anthony, and Phil Collins |

== Fashion show segments ==
=== Special Performance ===
| Performer | Song | Status |
|---|---|---|
| (United Kingdom) Phil Collins | Can't Stop Loving You | Live Performance |

=== Segment 1: Religious Holiday ===
| Performer | Song | Status |
|---|---|---|
| (Italy) Ennio Morricone | Vita Nostra | Remixed Recording |

| Nationality | Model(s) | Wings | Runway shows | Notes |
|---|---|---|---|---|
| (Brazil) Brazilian | Gisele Bündchen | | 1999–2003 • 2005–2006 | 2 Angel (2000–2007) |
| (Czech Republic) Czech | Karolína Kurková | | 2000–2003 • 2005–2008 • 2010 | |
| (Brazil) Brazilian | Adriana Lima | | 1999–2003 • 2005–2008 • 2010–2018 • 2024–2026 | 2 Angel (2000–2018) |
| (Estonia) Estonian | Carmen Kass | | 1999–2000 • 2002–2003 • 2008 | R |
| (United States) Americans | Tyra Banks | | 1996–2003 • 2005 • 2024 | 1 Angel (1997–2005) |
| (United States) Americans | Bridget Hall | W | 1998 • 2001–2002 | |
| (United Kingdom) British | Naomi Campbell | | 1996–1998 • 2002–2003 • 2005 | R |
| (Germany) German | Heidi Klum | | 1997–2003 • 2005 • 2007–2009 | 1 Angel (1999–2010) |
| (Netherlands) Dutch | Yfke Sturm | | 2002 • 2005 | NEW |
| (Brazil) Brazilian | Fernanda Tavares | | 2000–2003 • 2005 | |
| (Russia) Russian | Eugenia Volodina | | 2002–2003 • 2005 • 2007 | NEW |
| (Brazil) Brazilian | Alessandra Ambrosio | | 2000–2003 • 2005–2017 • 2024–2026 | FM |
| (United States) American | Lindsay Frimodt | | 2002–2003 | NEW |
| (Brazil) Brazilian | Michelle Alves | | 2002–2003 | NEW |
| (Switzerland) Swiss | Nadine Strittmatter | | 2002 | NEW |

=== Special Performance ===
| Performer | Song | Status |
|---|---|---|
| (United States) Destiny's Child | 8 Days Of Christmas | Live Performance |

=== Segment 2: Jungle Animals ===
| Performer | Song | Status |
|---|---|---|
| (United States) Donna Summer | State Of Independence | Remixed Recording |

| Nationality | Model(s) | Wings | Runway shows | Notes |
|---|---|---|---|---|
| (United States) American | Frankie Rayder | | 1999–2000 • 2002–2003 | R |
| (Brazil) Brazilian | Raquel Zimmermann | | 2002 • 2005–2006 | NEW |
| (Ethiopia) Ethiopian | Liya Kebede | W | 2002–2003 | NEW |
| (Netherlands) Dutch | Dewi Driegen | | 2002–2003 | NEW |
| (Brazil) Brazilians | Ana Beatriz Barros | | 2002–2003 • 2005–2006 • 2008–2009 | NEW |
| (Brazil) Brazilians | Caroline Ribeiro | W | 2000–2002 | |
| (Republic of Ireland) Irish | Caitriona Balfe | | 2002 | NEW |
| (Estonia) Estonian | Inga Savits | | 2002 | NEW |
| (India) Indian | Ujjwala Raut | | 2002–2003 | NEW |
| (Brazil) Brazilian | Ana Hickmann | | 2002 | NEW |
| (Hungary) Hungarian | Reka Ebergenyi | | 2002 | NEW |
| (Nigeria) Nigerian | Oluchi Onweagba | | 2000 • 2002–2003 • 2005–2007 | R |
| (Netherlands) Dutch | Yfke Sturm | | 2002 • 2005 | NEW |
| (United States) American | Bridget Hall | | 1998 • 2001–2002 | |
| (Estonia) Estonian | Carmen Kass | W | 1999-2000 • 2002–2003 • 2008 | |

=== Special Performance ===
| Performer | Song | Status |
|---|---|---|
| (United States) Marc Anthony | Tragedy | Live Performance |

=== Segment 3: Flamenco Frills ===
| Song | Status |
|---|---|
| Flamenco | Remixed Recording |

| Nationality | Model(s) | Wings | Runway shows | Notes |
|---|---|---|---|---|
| (United States) American | Tyra Banks | | 1996–2003 • 2005 • 2024 | 1 Angel (1997–2005) |
| (Brazil) Brazilian | Adriana Lima | | 1999–2003 • 2005–2008 • 2010–2018 • 2024–2026 | 2 Angel (2000–2018) |
| (Czech Republic) Czech | Karolína Kurková | | 2000–2003 • 2005–2008 • 2010 | Wearing "Star of Victoria Fantasy Bra" (Value: $10,000,000) |
| (United States) American | Lindsay Frimodt | | 2002–2003 | NEW |
| (United Kingdom) British | Naomi Campbell | W | 1996–1998 • 2002–2003 • 2005 | R |
| (Brazil) Brazilians | Gisele Bündchen | | 1999–2003 • 2005–2006 | 2 Angel (2000–2007) |
| (Brazil) Brazilians | Michelle Alves | | 2002–2003 | NEW |
| (Germany) German | Heidi Klum | | 1997–2003 • 2005 • 2007–2009 | 1 Angel (1999–2010) |
| (Brazil) Brazilian | Alessandra Ambrosio | | 2000–2003 • 2005–2017 • 2024–2026 | FM |
| (Russia) Russian | Eugenia Volodina | W | 2002–2003 • 2005 • 2007 | NEW |
| (Brazil) Brazilians | Fernanda Tavares | | 2000–2003 • 2005 | |
| (Brazil) Brazilians | Raquel Zimmermann | | 2002 • 2005–2006 | NEW |
| (United States) American | Frankie Rayder | | 1999–2000 • 2002–2003 | R |
| (Estonia) Estonian | Inga Savits | | 2002 | NEW |
| (Brazil) Brazilian | Ana Beatriz Barros | | 2002–2003 • 2005–2006 • 2008–2009 | NEW |

=== Segment 4: Neon Angels ===
| Performer | Song | Status |
|---|---|---|
| Red Hot Chili Peppers | By The Way | Remixed Recording |

| Nationality | Model(s) | Wings | Runway shows | Notes |
|---|---|---|---|---|
| (Czech Republic) Czech | Karolína Kurková | W | 2000–2003 • 2005–2008 • 2010 | |
| (Estonia) Estonian | Carmen Kass | | 1999–2000 • 2002–2003 • 2008 | R |
| (Ethiopia) Ethiopian | Liya Kebede | | 2002–2003 | NEW |
| (Brazil) Brazilians | Gisele Bündchen | W | 1999–2003 • 2005–2006 | 2 Angel (2000–2007) |
| (Brazil) Brazilians | Caroline Ribeiro | | 2000–2002 | |
| (Netherlands) Dutch | Yfke Sturm | | 2002 • 2005 | NEW |
| (Republic of Ireland) Irish | Caitriona Balfe | | 2002 | NEW |
| (Nigeria) Nigerian | Oluchi Onweagba | W | 2000 • 2002–2003 • 2005–2007 | R |
| (Netherlands) Dutch | Dewi Driegen | | 2002–2003 | NEW |
| (Brazil) Brazilian | Letícia Birkheuer | | 2002–2003 | NEW |
| (Hungary) Hungarian | Reka Ebergenyi | | 2002 | NEW |
| (Brazil) Brazilian | Fernanda Tavares | | 2000–2003 • 2005 | |
| (United States) American | Tyra Banks | | 1996–2003 • 2005 • 2024 | 1 Angel (1997–2005) |
| (Germany) German | Heidi Klum | W | 1997–2003 • 2005 • 2007–2009 | 1 Angel (1999–2010) |
| (United Kingdom) British | Naomi Campbell | | 1996–1998 • 2002–2003 • 2005 | |
| (Brazil) Brazilian | Adriana Lima | W | 1999–2003 • 2005–2008 • 2010–2018 • 2024–2026 | 2 Angel (2000–2018) |

== Finale ==
| Performer | Song | Status |
|---|---|---|
| Robbie Rivera | Funk-A-Tron | Remixed Recording |

Angels: Gisele Bündchen, Heidi Klum, Adriana Lima, Tyra Banks.

Returning models: Carmen Kass, Karolína Kurková, Bridget Hall, Naomi Campbell, Fernanda Tavares, Alessandra Ambrosio, Frankie Rayder, Caroline Ribeiro, Oluchi Onweagba.

Newcomers: Yfke Sturm, Eugenia Volodina, Lindsay Frimodt, Michelle Alves, Nadine Strittmatter, Raquel Zimmermann, Liya Kebede, Dewi Driegen, Ana Beatriz Barros, Caitriona Balfe, Inga Savits, Ujjwala Raut, Ana Hickmann, Reka Ebergenyi, Letícia Birkheuer.

== Index ==
| Symbol | Meaning |
|---|---|
| 1 | 1st Generation Angels |
| 2 | 2nd Generation Angels |
| W | Wings |
| NEW | Newcomer Model |
| R | Returning Model |
| FM | Fitting Model |
