= Victoria's Secret Fashion Show 2001 =

American lingerie show

- Status: Active
- Genre: Fashion show
- Date: November 13, 2001
- Frequency: Annually
- Venue: Bryant Park
- Locations: New York City, United States
- Years active: 1995–2003, 2005–2018, 2024–present
- Inaugurated: August 1, 1995
- Founder: Ed Razek
- Most recent: 2026
- Previous event: 2000
- Next event: 2002
- Member: Victoria's Secret
- Website: Victoria's Secret Fashion Show

The Victoria's Secret Fashion Show is an annual fashion show sponsored by Victoria's Secret, a brand of lingerie and sleepwear. Victoria's Secret uses the show to promote and market its goods in high-profile settings. The show features some of the world's leading fashion models, such as current Victoria's Secret Angels Tyra Banks, Heidi Klum, Daniela Peštová, Gisele Bündchen, and Adriana Lima.

The Victoria's Secret Fashion Show 2001 was recorded in New York, United States at Bryant Park, held in the Valhalla Tensile 1 membrane structure (tent), designed by Master Tentmaker Rudi Enos. The show featured musical performances by Andrea Bocelli and Mary J. Blige. Angel Heidi Klum was wearing the Victoria's Secret Fantasy Bra: The Heavenly Star Bra worth $12,500,000.

| Dates | Locations | Broadcaster | Viewers (millions) | Performers |
|---|---|---|---|---|
| November 13, 2001 (recorded); November 15, 2001 (aired) | Bryant Park, New York | ABC | 12.4 | Mary J. Blige and Andrea Bocelli |

== Fashion show segments ==
=== Special Performance ===
| Performer | Song | Status |
|---|---|---|
| (Italy) Andrea Bocelli | Mascagni | Live Performance |

=== Segment 1 ===
| Nationality | Model(s) | Wings | Runway shows | Notes |
|---|---|---|---|---|
| (Czech Republic) Czech | Karolína Kurková | | 2000–2003 • 2005–2008 • 2010 | |
| (Brazil) Brazilians | Gisele Bündchen | | 1999–2003 • 2005–2006 | 2 Angel (2000–2007) |
| (Brazil) Brazilians | Caroline Ribeiro | | 2000–2002 | |
| (Denmark) Danish | Rie Rasmussen | | 2001 | NEW |
| (Czech Republic) Czech | Eva Herzigová | | 1999–2001 • 2024 | |
| (United States) American | Maggie Rizer | | 2001 | NEW |
| (Sweden) Swedish | Mini Andén | | 2000–2001 • 2003 | |
| (Brazil) Brazilian | Fernanda Tavares | | 2000–2003 • 2005 | |
| (Germany) German | Heidi Klum | | 1997–2003 • 2005 • 2007–2009 | 1 Angel (1999–2010) |
| (United States) American | Trish Goff | | 1999–2001 | |
| (Sudan) Sudanese | Alek Wek | | 2001 | NEW |
| (Dominican Republic) Dominican | Omahyra Mota | | 2001 | NEW |
| (United Kingdom) British | Karen Elson | | 2001 | NEW |
| (Brazil) Brazilian | Adriana Lima | | 1999–2003 • 2005–2008 • 2010–2018 • 2024–2026 | 2 Angel (2000–2018) |
| (United States) Americans | Tyra Banks | | 1996–2003 • 2005 • 2024 | 1 Angel (1997–2005) |
| (United States) Americans | Bridget Hall | | 1998 • 2001–2002 | R |
| (United States) Americans | Molly Sims | | 2001 | NEW |
| (France) French | Audrey Marnay | | 2001 | NEW |
| (France) French | Aurélie Claudel | | 2000–2001 | |
| (Hungary) Hungarian | Diána Mészáros | | 2001 | NEW |
| (Brazil) Brazilian | Gisele Bündchen | | 1999–2003 • 2005–2006 | 2 Angel (2000–2007) |
| (Czech Republic) Czech | Karolína Kurková | | 2000–2003 • 2005–2008 • 2010 | |
| (Denmark) Danish | Rie Rasmussen | | 2001 | NEW |
| (United States) American | Maggie Rizer | | 2001 | NEW |
| (Sweden) Swedish | Mini Andén | | 2000–2001 • 2003 | |
| (Czech Republic) Czech | Daniela Peštová | | 1998–2001 | 1 Angel (1997–2001) |
| (United States) American | Rhea Durham | | 2000–2001 | |
| (Czech Republic) Czech | Eva Herzigová | | 1997 • 1999–2001 • 2024 | |
| (Germany) German | Heidi Klum | | 1997–2003 • 2005 • 2007–2009 | 1 Angel (1999–2010); Wearing "Heavenly Star Bra" (Value: $12,500,000) |
| (Brazil) Brazilian | Fernanda Tavares | | 2000–2003 • 2005 | |
| (United States) American | Tyra Banks | | 1996–2003 • 2005 • 2024 | 1 Angel (1997–2005) |
| (Belgium) Belgian | Anouck Lepere | | 2001 | NEW |
| (Brazil) Brazilian | Alessandra Ambrosio | | 2000–2003 • 2005–2017 • 2024–2026 | FM |
| (United States) American | Trish Goff | | 1999–2001 | |
| (Brazil) Brazilian | Caroline Ribeiro | | 2000–2002 | |
| (United States) American | Bridget Hall | | 1998 • 2001–2002 | R |
| (Brazil) Brazilian | Adriana Lima | | 1999–2003 • 2005–2008 • 2010–2018 • 2024–2026 | 2 Angel (2000–2018) |
| (United Kingdom) British | Karen Elson | | 2001 | NEW |
| (Sudan) Sudanese | Alek Wek | | 2001 | NEW |
| (Czech Republic) Czech | Daniela Peštová | | 1998–2001 | 1 Angel (1997–2001) |
| (Argentina) Argentinian | Inés Rivero | | 1998–2001 | Former 1 Angel (1998–1999) |
| (United Kingdom) British | Emma Heming | | 2001 | NEW |
| (Dominican Republic) Dominican | Omahyra Mota | | 2001 | NEW |
| (United States) American | Rhea Durham | | 2000–2001 | |
| (France) French | Aurélie Claudel | | 2000–2001 | |
| (France) French | Audrey Marnay | | 2001 | NEW |

=== Special Performance ===
| Performer | Song | Status |
|---|---|---|
| (United States) Mary J. Blige | Family Affair | Live Performance |

=== Segment 2 ===
| Nationality | Model(s) | Wings | Runway shows | Notes |
|---|---|---|---|---|
| (Brazil) Brazilian | Gisele Bündchen | W | 1999–2006 | 2 Angel (2000–2007) |
| (Denmark) Danish | Rie Rasmussen | W | 2001 | NEW |
| (Hungary) Hungarian | Diána Mészáros | W | 2001 | NEW |
| (Sweden) Swedish | Mini Andén | W | 2000–2001 • 2003 | |
| (Czech Republic) Czech | Karolína Kurková | W | 2000–2003 • 2005–2008 • 2010 | |
| (United States) American | Tyra Banks | W | 1996–2003 • 2005 • 2024 | 1 Angel (1997–2005) |
| (Brazil) Brazilian | Alessandra Ambrosio | W | 2000–2003 • 2005–2017 • 2024–2026 | FM |
| (United States) Americans | Bridget Hall | W | 1998 • 2001–2002 | R |
| (United States) Americans | Molly Sims | W | 2001 | NEW |
| (Germany) German | Heidi Klum | W | 1997–2003 • 2005 • 2007–2009 | 1 Angel (1999–2010) |
| (Belgium) Belgian | Anouck Lepere | W | 2001 | NEW |
| (United States) American | Maggie Rizer | W | 2001 | NEW |
| (Brazil) Brazilian | Caroline Ribeiro | W | 2000–2002 | |
| (Czech Republic) Czech | Eva Herzigová | W | 1997 • 1999–2001 • 2024 | |
| (Brazil) Brazilian | Adriana Lima | W | 1999–2003 • 2005–2008 • 2010–2018 • 2024–2026 | 2 Angel (2000–2018) |

== Index ==
| Symbol | Meaning |
|---|---|
| 1 | 1st Generation Angels |
| 2 | 2nd Generation Angels |
| W | Wings |
| NEW | Newcomer Model |
| R | Returning Model |
| FM | Fitting Model |

== Finale ==
Angels: Tyra Banks, Heidi Klum, Daniela Peštová, Gisele Bündchen, Adriana Lima.

Returning models: Karolína Kurková, Caroline Ribeiro, Eva Herzigová, Mini Andén, Fernanda Tavares, Trish Goff, Bridget Hall, Aurélie Claudel, Rhea Durham, Alessandra Ambrosio, Inés Rivero.

Newcomers: Rie Rasmussen, Maggie Rizer, Alek Wek, Omahyra Mota, Karen Elson, Molly Sims, Audrey Marnay, Diána Mészáros, Anouck Lepere, Emma Heming.
