= Victoria's Secret Fashion Show 2005 =

American lingerie show

- Status: Active
- Genre: Fashion show
- Date: November 9, 2005
- Frequency: Annually
- Venue: 69th Regiment Armory
- Locations: New York City, United States
- Years active: 1995–2003, 2005–2018, 2024–present
- Inaugurated: August 1, 1995
- Most recent: 2026
- Previous event: 2003
- Next event: 2006
- Member: Victoria's Secret
- Website: Victoria's Secret Fashion Show

The Victoria's Secret Fashion Show is an annual fashion show sponsored by Victoria's Secret, a brand of lingerie and sleepwear. Victoria's Secret uses the show to promote and market its goods in high-profile settings. The show features some of the world's leading fashion models, such as current Victoria's Secret Angels Tyra Banks, Heidi Klum, Gisele Bündchen, Adriana Lima, Alessandra Ambrosio, Karolína Kurková, Izabel Goulart, and Selita Ebanks.

The Victoria's Secret Fashion Show 2005 was recorded in New York City, United States at the 69th Regiment Armory. The show featured musical performances by Chris Botti, Seal, and Ricky Martin. Gisele Bündchen was wearing the Victoria's Secret Fantasy Bra : Sexy Splendor Fantasy Bra worth $12,500,000.

| Dates | Locations | Broadcaster | Viewers (millions) | Performers |
|---|---|---|---|---|
| November 9, 2005 (recorded); December 6, 2005 | New York, United States | CBS | 8.9 | Chris Botti, Seal, and Ricky Martin |

== Fashion Show segments ==
=== Segment 1: Sexy Santa Helpers ===
| Performer | Song | Status |
|---|---|---|
| (Australia) • (United Kingdom) Bodyrockers | I Like the Way | Remixed Recording |
| (United States) • (Germany) Andre Previn | Tchaikovsky's Swan Lake Ballet (Dance of the Cygnets) | Remixed Recording |

| Nationality | Model(s) | Wings | Runway shows | Notes |
|---|---|---|---|---|
| (Brazil) Brazilian | Gisele Bundchen | W | 1999–2003 • 2005–2006 | 2 Angel (2000–2007); Wearing "Sexy Splendor Fantasy Bra" (Value: $12,500,000) |
| (Czech Republic) Czech | Karolína Kurková | | 2000–2008 • 2010 | 3 Angel (2005–2009) |
| (Brazil) Brazilians | Alessandra Ambrosio | | 2000–2003 • 2005–2017 • 2024–2026 | 2 Angel (2004–2017) |
| (Brazil) Brazilians | Raquel Zimmermann | | 2002 • 2005–2006 | Comeback |
| (Italy) Italian | Bianca Balti | | 2005 | Newcomer |
| (Brazil) Brazilians | Ana Beatriz Barros | W | 2002–2003 • 2005–2006 • 2008–2009 | |
| (Brazil) Brazilians | Izabel Goulart | | 2005–2016 | 3 Angel (2005–2008) |
| (Netherlands) Dutch | Doutzen Kroes | | 2005–2006 • 2008–2009 • 2011–2014 • 2024–2026 | Newcomer |

=== Segment 2: Sexy Shadow Dreams ===
| Performer | Song | Status |
|---|---|---|
| (United Kingdom) Audio Bullys | Shot You Down | Remixed Recording |
| (United States) Henry Mancini | Lujon | Remixed Recording |

| Nationality | Model(s) | Wings | Runway shows | Notes |
|---|---|---|---|---|
| (United States) American | Tyra Banks | W | 1996–2003 • 2005 • 2024 | 1 Angel (1997–2005) |
| (Brazil) Brazilian | Fernanda Tavares | | 2000–2003 • 2005 | |
| (United States) American | Angela Lindvall | | 2000 • 2003 • 2005–2008 | |
| (Brazil) Brazilian | Adriana Lima | | 1999–2003 • 2005–2008 • 2010–2018 • 2024–2026 | 2 Angel (2000–2018) |
| (Russia) Russian | Tatiana Kovylina | W | 2005 • 2009 | Newcomer |
| (Brazil) Brazilian | Caroline Trentini | | 2005–2006 • 2009 • 2026 | Newcomer |
| (France) French | Morgane Dubled | | 2005–2008 | Newcomer |
| (Canada) Canadian | Andi Muise | | 2005–2007 | Newcomer |
| (United Kingdom) British | Naomi Campbell | | 1996–1998 • 2002–2003 • 2005 | |
| (Brazil) Brazilian | Isabeli Fontana | | 2003 • 2005 • 2007–2010 • 2012 • 2014 • 2024 | |

=== Segment 3: Sexy Crystal Princesses ===
| Performer | Song | Status |
|---|---|---|
| (United Kingdom) Seal | Love's Divine | Live Performance |
| (United Kingdom) Seal | Crazy | Live Performance |

| Nationality | Model(s) | Wings | Runway shows | Notes |
|---|---|---|---|---|
| (Germany) German | Heidi Klum | W | 1997–2003 • 2005 • 2007–2009 | 1 Angel (1999–2010) |
| (Russia) Russian | Eugenia Volodina | | 2002–2003 • 2005 • 2007 | |
| (Sweden) Swedish | Caroline Winberg | | 2005–2011 | Newcomer |
| (Russia) Russian | Natasha Poly | | 2005–2006 | Newcomer |
| (Germany) German | Julia Stegner | | 2005–2011 | Newcomer |
| Latvia | Ingūna Butāne | | 2005 • 2007–2008 | Newcomer |
| (Brazil) Brazilian | Gisele Bündchen | | 1999–2003 • 2005–2006 | 2 Angel (2000–2007) |
| (Netherlands) Dutch | Yfke Sturm | | 2002 • 2005 | |
| (Montenegro) Montenegrin | Marija Vujović | | 2005 • 2007 | Newcomer |
| (Czech Republic) Czech | Karolína Kurková | W | 2000–2008 • 2010 | 3 Angel (2005–2009) |
| (Brazil) Brazilian | Raquel Zimmermann | | 2002 • 2005–2006 | |
| (Nigeria) Nigerian | Oluchi Onweagba | | 2000 • 2002–2003 • 2005–2007 | |

=== Segment 4: Sexy Delicious ===
This segment was swapped in order of appearance with the fifth segment, Sexy Russian Babes, in the edited TV version.

| Performer | Song | Status |
|---|---|---|
| (United States) Aaron Carter | "I Want Candy" | Remixed Recording |
| (Barbados) Rihanna | Pon de Replay | Remixed Recording |

| Nationality | Model(s) | Wings | Runway shows | Notes |
|---|---|---|---|---|
| (Brazil) Brazilian | Adriana Lima | | 1999–2003 • 2005–2008 • 2010–2018 • 2024–2026 | 2 Angel (2000–2018) |
| (Italy) Italian | Bianca Balti | | 2005 | Newcomer |
| (Brazil) Brazilian | Alessandra Ambrosio | W | 2000–2003 • 2005-2017 • 2024–2026 | 2 Angel (2004–2017) |
| (France) French | Morgane Dubled | | 2005–2008 | Newcomer |
| (Netherlands) Dutch | Doutzen Kroes | | 2005–2006 • 2008–2009 • 2011–2014 • 2024–2026 | Newcomer |
| (Cayman Islands) Caymanian | Selita Ebanks | | 2005–2010 | 3 Angel (2005–2009) |
| (Brazil) Brazilian | Izabel Goulart | W | 2005–2016 | 3 Angel (2005–2008) |

=== Segment 5: Sexy Russian Babes ===
This segment was swapped in order of appearance with the fourth segment, Sexy Delicious, in the edited TV version.

| Performer | Song | Status |
|---|---|---|
| (United States) Snoop Dogg feat. (United States) Pharrell | Drop It Like It's Hot | Remixed Recording |
| (France) Paul Mauriat | Plaine, ma plaine | Remixed Recording |

| Nationality | Model(s) | Wings | Runway shows | Notes |
|---|---|---|---|---|
| (Russia) Russian | Eugenia Volodina | | 2002–2003 • 2005 • 2007 | |
| (Sweden) Swedish | Caroline Winberg | | 2005–2011 | Newcomer |
| (Russia) Russian | Tatiana Kovylina | | 2005 • 2009 | Newcomer |
| (Brazil) Brazilian | Caroline Trentini | W | 2005–2006 • 2009 • 2026 | Newcomer |
| (Canada) Canadian | Andi Muise | | 2005–2007 | Newcomer |
| (United States) Americans | Tyra Banks | | 1996–2003 • 2005 • 2024 | 1 Angel (1997–2005) |
| (United States) Americans | Angela Lindvall | | 2000 • 2003 • 2005–2008 | |
| (Germany) German | Julia Stegner | | 2005–2011 | Newcomer |
| (Russia) Russian | Natasha Poly | W | 2005–2006 | Newcomer |
| (Latvia) Latvian | Ingūna Butāne | | 2005 • 2007–2008 | Newcomer |
| (Germany) German | Heidi Klum | | 1997–2003 • 2005 • 2007–2009 | 1 Angel (1999–2010) |

=== Special Performance ===
| Performer | Song | Status |
|---|---|---|
| (Puerto Rico) Ricky Martin | Drop It On Me | Live Performance |

=== Segment 6: Sexy Toys ===
| Performer | Song | Status |
|---|---|---|
| (United States) Teairra Mari | La La | Remixed Recording |
| (United Kingdom) Basement Jaxx | Good Luck | Remixed Recording |
| (Australia) Jet | Are You Gonna Be My Girl | Remixed Recording |

| Nationality | Model(s) | Wings | Runway shows | Notes |
|---|---|---|---|---|
| (Czech Republic) Czech | Karolína Kurková | | 2000–2002 • 2005–2008 • 2010 | 3 Angel (2005–2009) |
| (Brazil) Brazilian | Gisele Bündchen | | 1999–2003 • 2005–2006 | 2 Angel (2000–2007) |
| (United Kingdom) British | Naomi Campbell | W | 1996–1998 • 2002–2003 • 2005 | |
| (Brazil) Brazilian | Fernanda Tavares | | 2000–2003 • 2005 | |
| (Montenegro) Montenegrin | Marija Vujović | | 2005 • 2007 | Newcomer |
| (Brazil) Brazilians | Isabeli Fontana | | 2003 • 2005 • 2007–2010 • 2012 • 2014 • 2024 | |
| (Brazil) Brazilians | Ana Beatriz Barros | | 2002–2003 • 2005–2006 • 2008–2009 | |
| (Cayman Islands) Caymanian | Selita Ebanks | | 2005–2010 | 3 Angel (2005–2009) |
| (Nigeria) Nigerian | Oluchi Onweagba | | 2000 • 2002–2003 • 2005–2007 | |
| (Brazil) Brazilians | Adriana Lima | W | 1999–2003 • 2005–2008 • 2010–2018 • 2024–2026 | 2 Angel (2000–2018) |
| (Brazil) Brazilians | Alessandra Ambrosio | | 2000–2003 • 2005–2017 • 2024–2026 | 2 Angel (2004–2017) |
| (United States) American | Tyra Banks | | 1996–2003 • 2005 • 2024 | 1 Angel (1997–2005) • Final Walk |

== Finale ==
Tyra Banks led the finale.

| Performer | Song | Status |
|---|---|---|
| (Australia) • (United Kingdom) Bodyrockers | I Like the Way | Remixed Recording |
| (United States) Aaron Carter | I Want Candy | Remixed Recording |

| Nationality | Model(s) | Wings | Runway shows | Notes |
|---|---|---|---|---|
| (United States) American | Tyra Banks | | 1996–2003 • 2005 • 2024 | 1 Angel (1997–2005) |
| (Brazil) Brazilian | Adriana Lima | | 1999–2003 • 2005–2008 • 2010–2018 • 2024–2026 | 2 Angel (2000–2018) |
| (Czech Republic) Czech | Karolína Kurková | | 2000–2003 • 2005–2008 • 2010 | 3 Angel (2005–2009) |
| (Brazil) Brazilian | Gisele Bündchen | | 1999–2003 • 2005–2006 | 2 Angel (2000–2007) |
| (Germany) German | Heidi Klum | | 1997–2003 • 2005 • 2007–2009 | 1 Angel (1999–2010) |
| (United Kingdom) British | Naomi Campbell | | 1996–1998 • 2002–2003 • 2005 | |
| (United States) American | Angela Lindvall | | 2000 • 2003 • 2005–2008 | |
| (Cayman Islands) Caymanian | Selita Ebanks | | 2005–2010 | 3 Angel (2005–2009) |
| (Brazil) Brazilian | Raquel Zimmermann | | 2002 • 2005–2006 | |
| (Montenegro) Montenegrin | Marija Vujović | | 2005 • 2007 | Newcomer |
| (France) French | Morgane Dubled | | 2005–2008 | Newcomer |
| (Brazil) Brazilian | Caroline Trentini | | 2005–2006 • 2009 • 2026 | Newcomer |
| (Russia) Russian | Eugenia Volodina | W | 2002–2003 • 2005 • 2007 | |
| (Sweden) Swedish | Caroline Winberg | | 2005–2011 | Newcomer |
| (Brazil) Brazilians | Fernanda Tavares | | 2000–2003 • 2005 | |
| (Brazil) Brazilians | Ana Beatriz Barros | | 2002–2003 • 2005–2006 • 2008–2009 | |
| (Nigeria) Nigerian | Oluchi Onweagba | | 2000 • 2002–2003 • 2005–2007 | |
| (Netherlands) Dutch | Yfke Sturm | | 2002 • 2005 | |
| (Russia) Russian | Tatiana Kovylina | | 2005 • 2009 | Newcomer |
| (Canada) Canadian | Andi Muise | | 2005–2007 | Newcomer |
| (Germany) German | Julia Stegner | | 2005–2011 | Newcomer |
| (Latvia) Latvian | Ingūna Butāne | | 2005 • 2007–2008 | Newcomer |
| (Netherlands) Dutch | Doutzen Kroes | | 2005–2006 • 2008–2009 • 2011–2014 • 2024–2026 | Newcomer |
| (Russia) Russian | Natasha Poly | | 2005–2006 | Newcomer |
| (Brazil) Brazilian | Isabeli Fontana | | 2003 • 2005 • 2007–2010 • 2012 • 2014 • 2024 | |
| (Italy) Italian | Bianca Balti | | 2005 | Newcomer |
| (Brazil) Brazilians | Izabel Goulart | | 2005–2016 | 3 Angel (2005–2008) |
| (Brazil) Brazilians | Alessandra Ambrosio | | 2000–2003 • 2005–2017 • 2024–2026 | 2 Angel (2004–2017) |

== Index ==
| Symbol | Meaning |
|---|---|
| 1 | 1st Generation Angels |
| 2 | 2nd Generation Angels |
| 3 | 3rd Generation Angels |
| W | Wings |
