= Frankie Rayder =

American model (born 1975)

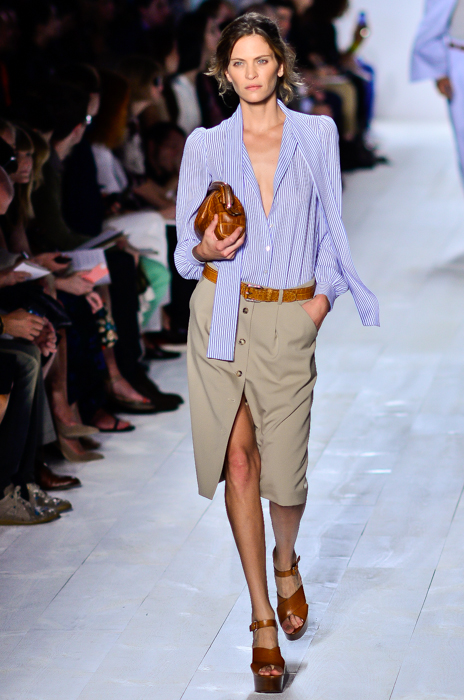
- Born: January 26, 1975 (age 51); River Falls, Wisconsin, United States
- Children: 1
- Modeling information
- Height: 1.78 m (5 ft 10 in)
- Hair color: Dark brown
- Eye color: Blue
- Agency: The Lions (New York); Oui Management (Paris); Louisa Models (Munich)

Francesca Rayder (born January 26, 1975) is an American model. She has a portfolio of covergirl appearances in high-fashion agazines and was once a VH1/Vogue Fashion Awards Model of the Year nominee. She has performed in runway shows, including the annual Victoria's Secret Fashion Show four times and the Sports Illustrated Swimsuit Issue twice. She has also been featured in print ad campaigns. At the peak of her fame, she was an it girl according to The New York Times, and GQ once named her the Sexiest Woman in the World.

She is known for her print work for Sports Illustrated Swimsuit issues, The Gap holiday ads, and a Godiva Chocolatier campaign, and the 50th anniversary Ann Taylor ad campaign. She has appeared on the cover of Vogue, Vogue Paris, Vogue Italia, British Vogue, German Vogue and Vogue España.

Rayder was engaged to Red Hot Chili Peppers bass player, Flea, with whom she has one child. After giving birth in 2005, she took a hiatus from modeling until 2008. At first, she returned only to print work, but she also returned to runway modeling in 2009. She has a younger sister, Missy Rayder, who is also a fashion model.

== Early years ==
Rayder was born in River Falls, Wisconsin, where she was known as Heidi Rayder. As a teenager, she moved to Minneapolis, Minnesota, a large city close to her home town, where she was first approached by a model scout who spurred her interest in the industry. Her first major success came in 1992, when she met photographer Steven Meisel. Meisel booked her for a photo session, which became the first of many. Rayder's first session was soon featured in the magazine Italian Glamour. She is a graduate of River Falls High School, where she played for the basketball team, and she began her modeling career with Caryn Modeling & Talent Agency in Minneapolis. She worked at a golf clubhouse in her youth. She was given the stage name Francesca to seem more exotic.

== Career highlights ==
Rayder made her Paris runway debut on the 1997 fall runway for designers like Chanel, Christian Lacroix, and Dries van Noten. In 1998, she was in high demand and her booking prices were sometimes bid up to $25,000 by clients hoping to pay her enough to cancel other appearances. In 1999, she became the face of Givenchy and Meisel photographed her for Dolce & Gabbana and Versace ad campaigns. In the fall of 2000, The New York Times referred to her and her sister collectively as the famous Rayder Sisters. At the same time, it also described Frankie as an it girl.

In 1999, she became the face of Givenchy. During New York Fashion Week 1999, Rayder was booked solid for four or five shows a day for designers such as Marc Jacobs, Badgley Mischka, Daryl K, Tommy Hilfiger and John Bartlett in typical day. In 2000, she was one of the top-priced models. That season she modelled in the Victoria's Secret Fashion Show. Later that year she was a nominee at the 2000 VH1/Vogue Fashion Awards for Model of the year along with Gisele Bündchen, Carmen Kass, Angela Lindvall, and Maggie Rizer, but Kass was the winner after defending-winner Bundchen withdrew to host the show.

In 2003 she became the face of Chanel. Rayder worked New York Fashion Week for top designers for several years. During the 40h Anniversary Swimsuit Issue shooting, Stewart Shining photographed Rayder. Rayder is, along with Cheryl Tiegs and Melissa Keller, one of several models associated with Minnesota who have made a name in the Swimsuit Issue. She has also appeared in 1999, 2000, 2002, and 2003 Victoria's Secret fashion shows and a cameo role in the 2001 movie Zoolander. In the early 2000s, GQ named her the Sexiest Woman in the World.

In 2004, she was one of the featured models (along with Linda Evangelista, Patti Hansen and her daughters Alexandra and Theodora Richards, Twiggy, and Beverly Johnson) in the 50-model 50th Anniversary Ann Taylor ad campaign photographed by Annie Leibovitz. Rayder was also mentioned in the press for several months for an ad campaign for Godiva Chocolatier. In 2005, she appeared in ads, which also included models such as Sophie Dahl, and Anouck Lepere, where the models posed lovingly with chocolate goods for Valentine's Day in Vogue, Harper's Bazaar, and Elle. The promotion was for chocolate products that came with a "lottery" ticket that potentially could give the buyer 52 pairs of Manolo Blahnik shoes, including one custom-designed by Blahnik himself. The ads began receiving publicity in the fall of 2004.

Between 2004 and 2009, Rayder took a hiatus from runway modeling. She returned to the stage in New York in February 2009 for the Fall 2009 show. She had previously made a return to print work in fall 2008 advertisement campaigns for both Stella McCartney and Roberto Cavalli and for the 2008 Gap holiday campaign. Rayder also became part of The Gap's United States and Japan 2009 spring/summer campaigns. As part of her comeback, Rayder performed covergirl work for the February 2009 Vogue España and one of fourteen alternative covers for the September 2008 V magazine.

== Notable affiliations and appearances ==
Following her success, Rayder traveled to Miami Beach, New York, Paris, London, and Milan, working for a number of agencies such as Company, Women Model Management, Page 305, City Models, Take Two, Storm, and Why Not. Her advertisement portfolio includes Givenchy, Valentino, Lagerfeld, Chanel, Gucci, Dolce & Gabbana, Versace, DKNY, Gap, and Tommy Hilfiger. Rayder has also worked for designers such as Anne Klein, Matthew Williamson, Zac Posen, Marc Jacobs, Donna Karan, Carolina Herrera, and Michael Kors, and appeared in a number of magazines, including Elle, Vogue, The Face, Photo, Harper's Bazaar, Allure, Rebel, and Marie Claire. Her magazine cover credits include: US Vogue (November 2000), Vogue Paris (April 1999), Vogue Italia (January 1999), British Vogue (April 1999, July 1999, November 1999, January 2001), German Vogue (September 1997, May 2000), Vogue España (July 2000, January 2004, February 2009), Vogue South Korea (December 2000), Vogue Brazil (September 2000), Elle France (August 2000), Elle United States (August 2000), and Elle Germany (September 1992). She was also featured in the 2004 (40th Anniversary) and 2005 Sports Illustrated Swimsuit Issue. She appeared in the video for Phoenix's "Funky Squaredance," which was directed by her then-boyfriend Roman Coppola.

== Personal life ==
Rayder has three sisters and one brother; her father was still living in River Falls in 2004.

In 2002 Rayder was falsely linked to Nicolas Cage after his relationship with Lisa Marie Presley ended and when she was dating his cousin Roman Coppola. Her relationship with Coppola was widely chronicled and serious; that year, she was close to marrying the son of Francis Ford Coppola by some accounts. Early in her career, Rayder and her sister Missy lived across the street from each other. They were featured together on the May 2000 cover of Harper's Bazaar. The Rayder sisters (along with a third sister named Molly) appeared in holiday advertisements for Gap as siblings in 2003 to the tune of "Put a Little Love in Your Heart". In later years, the Rayder sisters appeared in Gap holiday advertisements as a pair.

In 2004, Rayder started dating Red Hot Chili Peppers' bass player, Flea. In January 2005 the couple publicly announced their engagement. On October 26, 2005, Rayder gave birth to her first child, a daughter named Sunny Bebop Balzary. Flea's bandmate, John Frusciante, is Sunny's godfather. The song, "Hard to Concentrate" from the Red Hot Chili Peppers' 2006 album, Stadium Arcadium was written by Anthony Kiedis as a wedding proposal for Flea and Rayder. Rayder and Flea lived together in Malibu, California before separating.

In the September 2010 issue of C magazine, Rayder is featured with a group of women friends known as "The L.A. Ladies Choir" which meets at her and Flea's house in Los Feliz. The article goes on to mention that Flea is her husband and that he joins the women's group playing bass. The choir's group came out with their first album in September 2010 named "Joyfully."

Rayder is a Boston Red Sox fan, and she is also a Green Bay Packers fan. Rayder has volunteered her time to youth arts programs.
