= Razor Sharp =

Razor Sharp may refer to:

- Razor Sharp Records, List of Wu-Recording record labels
- Razor Sharp Victoria's Secret Fashion Show 2003
- Jim "Razor" Sharp (1965) American retired professional bull rider native to West Texas
- "Razor Sharp", song by Pegboard Nerds and Tristam
