= Isabeli Fontana =

Brazilian supermodel (born 1983)

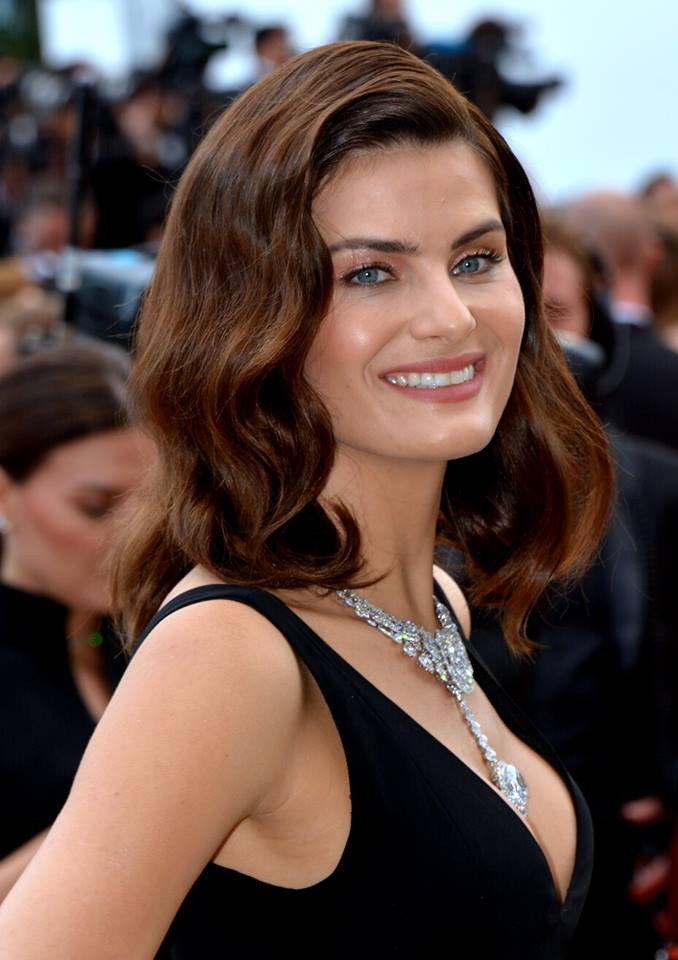
- Fontana at the 2018 Cannes Film Festival
- Born: Isabeli Bergossi Fontana; 4 July 1983 (age 43); Curitiba, Paraná, Brazil
- Occupation: Model
- Spouses: Álvaro Jacomossi (m. 2000; div. 2004) Henri Castelli (m. 2005; div. 2007) Diego Ferrero (m. 2016)
- Children: 2
- Modeling information
- Height: 1.77 m (5 ft 9 1/2 in)
- Hair color: Brown
- Eye color: Blue
- Agency: Women Management (New York, Paris, Milan); Next Model Management (London); Uno Models (Barcelona); 2pm Model Management (Copenhagen); Mega Model Agency (Hamburg); Elite Model Management (Hong Kong); The Face Models (Mexico City); MP MEGA MIAMI (Miami); Louisa Models (Munich); Mega Model Brasil (Sao Paulo); MP Stockholm (Stockholm); Chic Management (Sydney)

Isabeli Bergossi Fontana (Brazilian Portuguese: [izaˈbɛli fõˈtɐnɐ]; born 4 July 1983) is a Brazilian model. She is known for her work with brands like Victoria's Secret and has been on the cover of Vogue 58 times. Vogue Paris named her one of the top 30 models of the 2000s decade.

== Early life ==
Fontana was born in Curitiba, Paraná, Brazil, to Maribel Bergossi and Antonio Carlos Fontana. She is of Italian descent, and states that a grandmother had some Portuguese roots. At just 13 years of age she made it to the finals of the 1996 Elite Model Look. The following year she moved from Brazil to Milan, Italy.

== Career ==
=== Early work 1996-1999 ===
Isabeli Fontana started modelling at the age of 12, and with the support of her mother, she entered a local Elite Model Look contest and ranked in the 3rd place. In 1997, she decided to pursue modeling professionally by moving to Milan.

Fontana started walking the runways in Milan and made her debut walking at Milan fashion week for shows such as Versace, Givenchy, Michael Kors when she was only 15. Fontana appeared in the Valentino advertising F/W 1999 advertising campaign photographed by Mario Testino along with Gisele Bündchen, Audrey Marnay, and Aurelie Claudel.

In 1999, at the age of 16, she appeared in the Victoria's Secret lingerie catalogue. The shoot caused controversy, as Victoria's Secret stated that they would not use models younger than 18. Soon after the Victoria's Secret shoot, she was signed by Versace, Ralph Lauren, and Valentino.

Since 1999 she has modeled for Sports Illustrated Swimsuit Issue, Marie Claire, ELLE, Vogue, Harper's Bazaar, Numéro, i-D, Arena and many others.

=== Rise to prominence 2000-2005 ===
In 2001, Fontana appeared on her first Vogue cover for Vogue Hellas and in 2002, she appeared on Vogue Paris for the March issue. Fontana rose to prominence after appearing on the cover of Vogue US in 2004 along with Natalia Vodianova, Daria Werbowy, Gemma Ward, Liya Kebede, Gisele Bündchen, Karen Elson, Karolina Kurkova and was photographed by Steven Meisel.

In 2004, she became the face of Hermès, appeared on the advertising campaign for Versace Crystal Noir Fragrance and for Versace Make Up line. In the same year she appeared on the Balenciaga, Versace, and Chanel F/W 2004 campaigns.

In 2005, Fontana appeared on the Versace Crystal Noir Fragrance campaign and the Helena Rubinstein S/S 05 campaign. She also appeared on the cover of Vogue Paris.

=== Further recognition and fame 2008-present ===
Fontana appeared on the advertising campaign for the Revlon Fair Fragrance in 2008. She also appeared on numerous advertising campaigns that same year, such as Versace F/W 08, Balenciaga S/S 08, Pepe Jeans, Roberto Cavalli, H&M, Flowerbomb, Valentino. In 2008, Fontana made her debut on the Forbes The World's 15 Top-Earning Models list at place 11, having earned $3 million.

In 2009, she was featured as a 'Face of the Moment' in May 2009's US Vogue and appeared on the Viktor&Rolf and Revlon Fair, Fragrance campaigns. She also appeared on the Chanel F/W 09 makeup line campaign. Fontana also appeared on the cover of Vogue Paris for the November issue. In 2010, she closed the Victoria's Secret "Game on" Segment.

In June 2011, Fontana appeared on the cover of Vogue Paris and Vogue Korea, and in 2014 she appeared on the cover of Vogue Italia.

Fontana has been the face of a variety of advertising campaigns including Shiatzy Chen, Armani Jeans, Chanel, Bulgari, Colcci, Disritmia, Dolce and Gabbana, Emporio Armani, Enrique Martinez, Escada, H&M, Helena Rubinstein, Hugo Boss, Hussein Chalayan, Leonisa, Massimo Dutti, Mango M. Officer, Nicole Farhi, Oscar de la Renta, Peter Hahn, Philips, Ralph Lauren, Revlon, Roberto Cavalli, Rosa Chá, Saks Fifth Avenue, Tommy Hilfiger, Triton, Valentino, Versace, Victoria's Secret, Vivara and others. Photographed by Steven Meisel, she was presented on the September 2004 cover of American Vogue as one of the "Models of the Moment".

Fontana can be seen in the spring/summer 2011 campaigns for Escada, Dolce and Gabbana, Uniqlo, and Ann Taylor. Fontana had been the face of Viktor & Rolf's fragrance Flowerbomb in 2014 as well as Bvlgari's Goldea from 2015. She has appeared in the Pirelli Calendar on a number of occasions, including in the 2011 calendar, which features models posing as Greek and Roman gods, photographed by Karl Lagerfeld. In 2011, she was part of the Miss Universe 2011 judging panel.

== Personal life ==
In her youth, Fontana attended a Catholic school in the Portão district of Curitiba. She is often seen making the sign of the cross in footage. Nevertheless, she is a non-practicing Roman Catholic. She was married to model Álvaro Jacomossi but they divorced in 2004. Their son, Zion, was born in 2003. Fontana married actor and model Henri Castelli on 10 December 2005, and their son, Lucas, was born on 23 October 2006 in São Paulo. Fontana and Castelli divorced in 2007. She was engaged to Rohan Marley but the engagement ended in early 2013. In 2021 she gained Italian citizenship due to her Italian ancestry.

== Filmography ==
Year	Title	Role	Notes
1998	Torre de Babel	Herself	Invited
2005	Belíssima	Herself	Invited
2010	A Vida Alheia	Verônica Moyana	
2010	Passione	Herself	Invited
2011	Aline	Princess Léa	
2015	Hidden Truths	Herself	Angel Parade
