= Rebel Magazine =

English fashion and lifestyle magazine

- Cover of issue 2, Spring Summer 2011
- Editor: Namal Lanka
- Categories: Fashion lifestyle magazine
- Frequency: Twice yearly
- Format: Online & Magazine
- Founded: 2009
- Based in: Rugby, England
- Language: English
- Website: rebelmagazine.co.uk

Rebel Magazine is a bi-annual fashion and lifestyle magazine, focusing on creative industries including designers, art, film and music.

The magazine is published by University of Northampton graduate Namal Lanka, who serves as the magazine's editor and creative director.

The magazine was founded in November 2009 and the first issue was published online on 31 March 2010. The magazine features up and coming brands, emerging fashion graduates, independent designers and unpublished writers. The online readership for the first issue of the magazine reached in excess of twenty-thousand, prompting the publishers to print a limited number of copies.
