= Estonian Chess Federation =

Sports governing body in Estonia

Estonian Chess Federation (abbreviation ECF; Estonian: Eesti Maleliit) is one of the sport governing bodies in Estonia which deals with chess.

The ECF was established in 1931 and re-established in 1990.

The president of the ECF is Ken Koort.
