= Ana Beatriz Barros =

Brazilian model (born 1982)

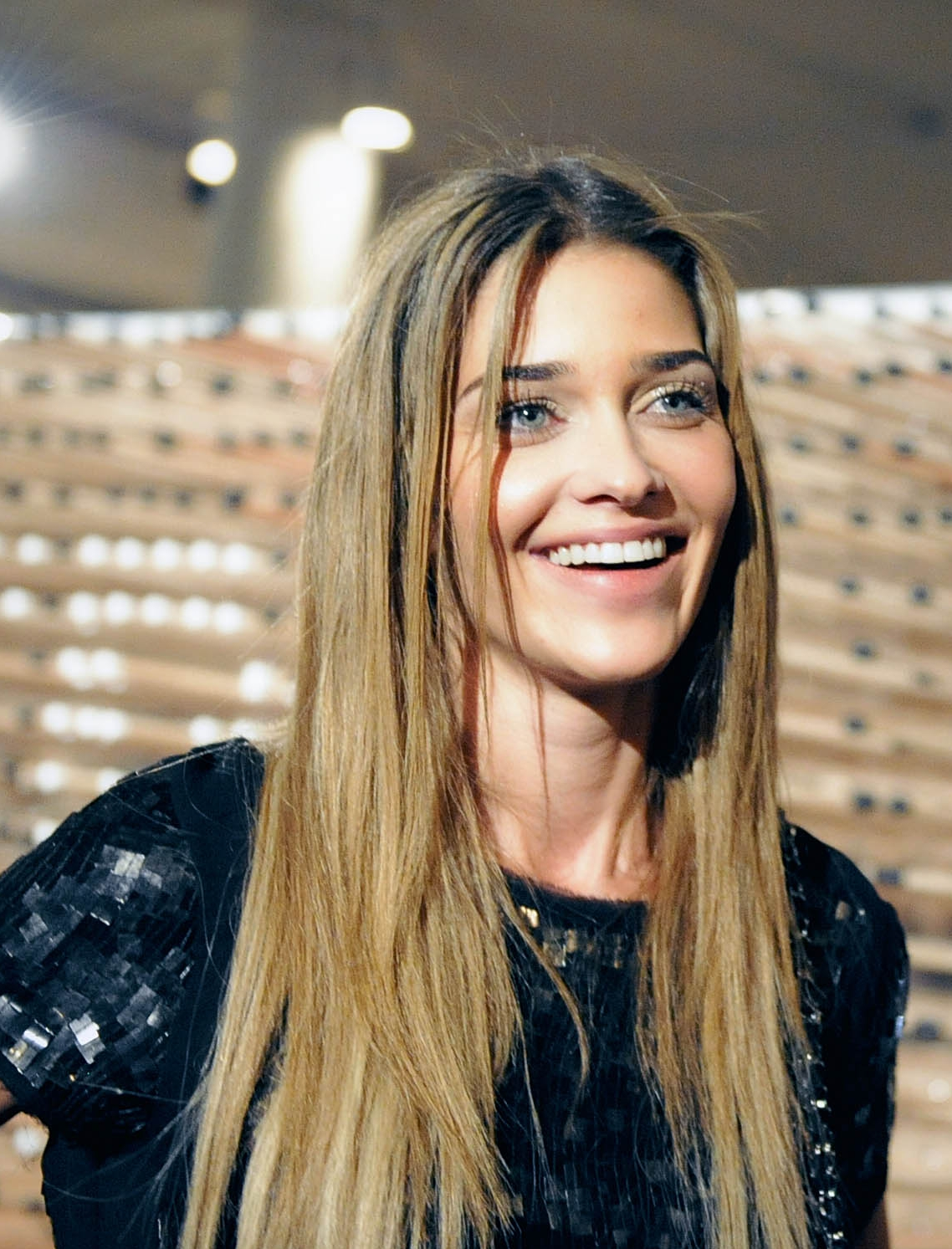
- Barros in 2011
- Born: 29 May 1982 (age 44); Itabira, Minas Gerais, Brazil
- Occupation: Model
- Years active: 1996–present
- Spouse: Karim El Chiaty (m. 2016)
- Children: 2
- Modeling information
- Height: 1.81 m (5 ft 11 1/2 in)
- Hair color: Dark blonde
- Eye color: Green
- Agency: Next Model Management (New York, Paris, London); Fashion Model Management (Milan); Uno Models (Barcelona); Elite Model Management (Copenhagen, Toronto); Model Management (Hamburg); MP MEGA MIAMI (Miami Beach); Mega Model Brazil (Sao Paulo); MIKAs (Stockholm)

Ana Beatriz Barros (born 29 May 1982) is a Brazilian model, known for her multiple appearances in the Sports Illustrated Swimsuit Issue and for her work with Intimissimi, GUESS, Bebe, Victoria's Secret, Chanel cosmetics, and Jennifer Lopez's JLO fashion line.

== Early life ==
Barros was born in the town of Itabira, Minas Gerais, Brazil, to Sônia, a housewife, and Reinato Barros, a mechanical engineer. Later, her family moved to Rio de Janeiro, where she spent her childhood. She is of German, Portuguese, Italian and Spanish descent.

== Career ==
=== Modeling career ===
==== 1990s ====
When she was 13, Barros and her older sister, Patricia, were vacationing in Rio de Janeiro when they were spotted by a representative from Elite Model Management. Barros was encouraged by the Rio Elite office to participate in the Elite Model Look 1996, which she was runner up to Diana Kovalchuk. Barros subsequently competed for international Elite Model Look and placed second worldwide. Elite sent her portfolio and recent Polaroid shots to GUESS? which led her to do the Millennium GUESS? campaign along with her friend and fellow Brazilian model Alessandra Ambrosio.

==== 2000s–2010s ====
In addition to Guess?, Barros has done advertisements for Christian Dior, Armani Jeans, Oakley, L'Oréal, Diesel, Victoria's Secret, Chanel cosmetics, and Jennifer Lopez's JLO fashion line, among others. In 2004 Jennifer Lopez selected Barros to be the face of her new lingerie line, JLO Lingerie. Lopez said, "I wanted someone young, sexy and urban, with a universal appeal". Barros has been in shows for the likes of Valentino, Missoni, Gucci, Christian Dior, Versace, Emporio Armani, BCBG, DKNY, Jean-Paul Gaultier, Dolce & Gabbana, Michael Kors, Balmain, Etro, Loewe, Vivienne Westwood, Diane Von Furstenberg, Chloe, Giles Deacon, Stella McCartney, John Galliano, Thierry Mugler, Guy Laroche, Karl Lagerfeld, Mango, Elie Saab and many more prestigious fashion houses. She walked in the Victoria's Secret Fashion Show in 2002, 2003, 2005, 2006, 2008, and 2009.

She has been on numerous covers of magazines such as Glamour, Vogue, Marie Claire, Allure; Brazilian magazines such as Capricho and Audi magazine, W, Elle to name a few. Barros appeared seven times on Sports Illustrated in the Swimsuit Issue (2002, 2003, 2004, 2005, 2006, 2007, 2008). Barros was named number 96 in FHM magazine's "100 Sexiest Women in the World" supplement in 2006.

She was chosen to be in the 2010 Pirelli Calendar photographed by Terry Richardson in Bahia, Brazil, alongside Lily Cole, Daisy Lowe, Miranda Kerr and other models. Barros replaced Lindsay Lohan for Fornarina's Spring Summer 2010 campaign and look book. She has already filmed her first commercial for the company. Barros was also featured in the 2010 Spring/Summer campaign for British retailer Marks and Spencers alongside Twiggy, VV Brown, Lisa Snowdon and Dannii Minogue.

Barros was the ambassador for Italian lingerie brand Intimissimi from 2005 to 2008. In August 2014 she was announced once again as the new face for Intimissimi. In March 2014, she appeared in an ad campaign for Azzaro Fragrance with Ian Somerhalder.

== Personal life ==
Barros married Greek-Egyptian millionaire Karim El Chiaty on the Greek island of Mykonos on 8 July 2016. The list of attendees included fellow Victoria's Secret supermodels, Alessandra Ambrosio, Adriana Lima, Isabeli Fontana and Fernanda Motta.

In December 2017, she gave birth to the couple's first child, a son. Barros announced she was expecting her second child in September 2019.

== Filmography ==
Film roles
Year	Title	Role	Notes
2010	Modelgeddon	Warrior	Short film
2016	Zoolander 2	'Old and Lame' Show Attendee	

Television roles
Year	Title	Role	Notes
2005	Belíssima	Modelo	Episode: "Episode #1.1"
2013	Domingão do Faustão	Herself / Contestant	Episodes: "Episode dated 19 May 2013" and "Episode dated 2 June 2013"
2014	New Girl	Herself	Episode: "Prince"
2014	Model Turned Superstar	Herself / Judge	Episode: "Los Angeles"
