= Marcelle Bittar =

Brazilian model

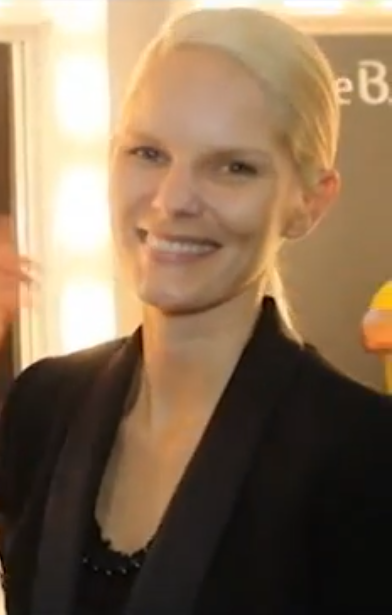
- In a 2012 interview
- Born: May 5, 1981 (age 44); Guarapuava, Paraná, Brazil
- Modeling information
- Height: 1.79 m (5 ft 10 1/2 in)
- Hair color: Brown
- Eye color: Green

Marcelle Bittar de Almeida (born May 5, 1981), is a Brazilian model from Guarapuava, Paraná.

== Career ==
In 1996, Bittar was registered by her mother in an Elite Model Management contest and subsequently joined the agency casting at only 14 years old. She‘s of Lebanese descent. Her other agencies include Ford (New York, Miami), Women (Milan), Select (London), Mega (Hamburg), and Ten Model Management Agency, which is her mother's agency. In 2001, Bittar was nominated for the Abit Fashion Awards for the best female model. That same year, she participated in the São Paulo Fashion Week/Breast Cancer campaign at Alvo da Moda. She has walked for designers such as Alexander McQueen and Ellus, appeared in Victoria's Secret Fashion Show in 2003, and has been photographed by Mario Testino. As of 2016, was still modelling. She has also hosted a TV show.
