= Caroline Ribeiro =

Brazilian model, actress and a television personality (born 1980)

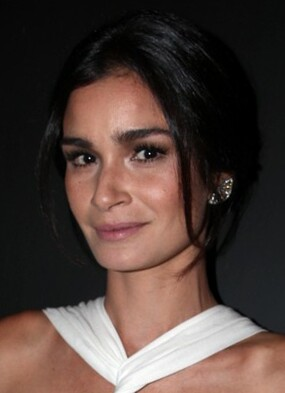
- Born: September 20, 1980 (age 45); Belém, Brazil
- Occupations: Model; Actress
- Spouse: Paulo Laurenço
- Children: 1

Caroline Magalhães Ribeiro (born 20 September 1980) is a Brazilian model, actress, and a television personality. She is best known for appearing on the Victoria's Secret fashion show and also walking for brands such as Gucci and Yves Saint Laurent. She was the favorite model of Tom Ford. Ribeiro worked with photographers such as Mario Testino and Steven Meisel. She's also known for her roles such as Anjo de Mim, Lower City, Belissima and Alice.

== Early life ==
Caroline Magalhães Ribeiro was born on 20 September 1980 in Belém, Para, Brazil. She is of Amerindian, Portuguese and African descent. Ribeiro stated that when she was young she was bullied at school, and used to wear long sleeves.

== Career ==
Ribeiro began her modelling career aged 14. The following year she participated in a modelling competition in São Paulo which was when she decided to continue her career. She was approached by a stranger who invited her to represent Belém and Manaus in the Elite Model Lux competition in São Paulo. Ribeiro went on to win the world podium in Korea.

She then moved to New York to pursue her career where she was discovered by Tom Ford who at the time was the creative director of Gucci. At 21 years old Ribeiro became the face of Revlon and was earning $100,000 per hour. At the time she was the highest paid Brazilian model after Gisele Bündchen.

In 1999 she appeared on the cover of Vogue Italia photographed by Steven Meisel. The following year she appeared once again, together with models including Karen Elson, Ana Claudia Michels, Audrey Marnay and Maggie Rizer. In May she appeared on the cover of Vogue Paris. She appeared on 14 Vogue covers:

- Vogue Germany, October 1999
- Vogue Italy, December 1999
- Vogue Italy, January 2000
- Vogue France, May 2000
- Vogue Brazil, June 2000
- Vogue Spain, October 2000
- Vogue Japan, February 2001
- Vogue Australia, June 2002
- Vogue Spain, July 2002
- Vogue Brazil, March 2003
- Vogue Brazil, April 2003
- Vogue Brazil, November 2004
- Vogue Brazil, May 2010
- Vogue Brazil July 2016

Ribeiro participated in the Victoria's Secret Fashion Show in 2000, 2001 and 2002. In 2001 she appeared on the Pirelli Calendar.

She has been photographed by Mario Testino, Raymond Meier and has frequently collaborated with Steven Meisel.

== Personal life ==
Ribeiro is married to businessman, Paulo Laurenço. They have one son. Ribeiro was diagnosed with endometriosis at the age of 18 causing her to have four miscarriages.
