= Dewi Driegen =

Dutch model

- Born: 15 September 1982 (age 44); Amsterdam, Netherlands
- Modeling information
- Height: 1.78 m (5 ft 10 in)
- Hair color: Blonde
- Eye color: Green
- Agency: Elite Model Management (Paris, Copenhagen, Toronto); Women Management (Milan); Models 1 (London); Paparazzi Model Management (Amsterdam); Uno Models (Barcelona); Seeds Management GmbH (Berlin); Modelwerk (Hamburg); Munich Models (Munich); Stockholmsgruppen (Stockholm)

Dewi Driegen (born 15 September 1982) is a Dutch model, and her mother is a quarter Indonesian.

Driegen was discovered at the age of thirteen by an Elite Model Management Amsterdam modeling scout but decided to stay in school. After her 18th birthday though, she began modeling in Paris and Milan in shows such as Valentino and Versace.

Driegen's first campaign was for the Fall 2002 Balenciaga collection and has continued to do advertisements for Armani Exchange, Gucci, New York & Company, Versus, Barneys and numerous others. She has also appeared on the covers of Russian Vogue in December 2002, UK's Vogue and i-D in March 2003 amongst others. She first appeared in Vogue Paris in October 2003. She has also appeared on the Victoria's Secret televised fashion show in 2002 and 2003. In 2004, she was photographed by Nick Knight for the Pirelli Calendar.

Other runway credits of hers include Alberta Ferretti, Alexander McQueen, Chanel, Christian Lacroix, Christian Dior, D&G, Emanuel Ungaro, Elie Saab, Emilio Pucci, John Galliano, Givenchy, Marc Jacobs, Michael Kors, Miu Miu, Ralph Lauren, and Roberto Cavalli.

Since 2019, she lives in Ibiza, Spain.
