= Carmen Kass =

Estonian fashion model (born 1978)

- Kass in 2010
- Born: 14 September 1978 (age 48); Paide, then part of Estonian SSR, Soviet Union
- Modelling information
- Height: 1.79 m (5 ft 10 1/2 in)
- Hair colour: Blonde
- Eye colour: Green
- Agency: Women Management (New York); Silent (Paris); Brave Model Management (Milan); TESS Management (London); Uno Models (Barcelona); Elite Model Management (Copenhagen); Mega Model Agency (Hamburg); MGM Models (Hamburg); MIKAs (Stockholm)

Carmen Kass (born 14 September 1978) is an Estonian model, actress, and fashion journalist. The American edition of Vogue declared her and Gisele Bündchen the two supermodels of the moment on its January 2000 cover. In 2026, she was appointed editor-in-chief of Elle Baltic (Estonia).

Outside of modeling, Kass ran for the European Parliament in 2004 and was the president of the Estonian Chess Federation from 2004 to 2011.

== Early life ==
Kass was born in Paide, Estonia and grew up in the village of Mäo, near Paide, Järva County. Kass, her elder sister Victoria and elder brother Kutty were raised by their mother, Koidu Põder. Her father, Viktor Kass, was a chess teacher in Põlva.

== Career ==
=== Modeling ===
When Kass was 14 years old, she was discovered in a supermarket by a model scout from Milan. Her first venture into the modeling world was unsuccessful, and Kass left Milan after a short time.

Kass then moved to Paris at the age of eighteen. She soon received exposure by appearing on the covers of American, French, British, and Italian Vogue, Australian Elle, UK Image, Madame Figaro, and French Numéro. Kass's first Vogue cover was French Vogue in November 1997.

Kass backstage at a Bill Blass fashion show in 2003

Her career was launched by Anna Wintour, and by 1999, Kass was walking the runway for numerous and diverse top designers, such as Marc Jacobs, Michael Kors, Calvin Klein, Ralph Lauren, Donna Karan, and Dolce & Gabbana; and posing in advertisements for designers and brands, like Calvin Klein, Chanel, Gucci, Donna Karan, Dsquared2, Versace, Givenchy, Fendi, Max Mara, Valentino, Ralph Lauren, Narciso Rodriguez, and even General Motors. She also appeared in a Gap denim advertising campaign, and was a spokesperson for Revlon cosmetics, Sephora, and the Christian Dior perfume, J'adore. In 2007 alone, Kass booked ten campaigns with notable designers for Spring/Summer collections. From 2007 onwards, she became the model and spokesperson for Max Factor.

Kass was the muse of Michael Kors, and the face of the brand for 10 consecutive years. Kass has been also the spokesperson of the Narciso Rodriguez For Her perfume and several of its editions for 17 consecutive years to date.

Kass was named "Model of the Year" at the 2000 VH1/Vogue Fashion Awards. In the year 2002, she was estimated to have been the second-highest-paid model in the world. She is well-known for her distinctive runway walk in the fashion industry. Despite her height, her feet are relatively small (about an American size seven).

She opened and closed the Victoria's Secret Fashion Show in 1999, and also walked for the brand in 2000, 2002, 2003, and 2008.

She is considered to be one of the models who ended the heroin chic era along with Gisele Bündchen.

=== Film ===
While living in New York, she attended the Lee Strasberg Institute. In 2004, Kass played the female lead in the Estonian murder-mystery film Täna öösel me ei maga ("We Won't Sleep Tonight"; titled "Set Point" in the international release). She also had a cameo appearance in the film Zoolander, where she played herself opening the Derelicte fashion show.

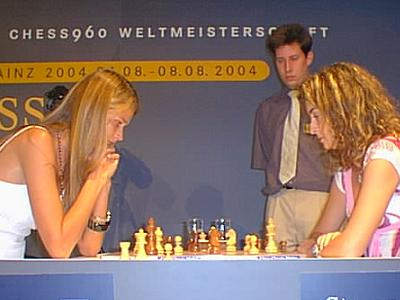
Kass (left) participating in the 2004 Mainz Chess Classic

=== Politics ===
In February 2004, she joined Estonia's ruling Res Publica Party. Kass ran for the European Parliament after her homeland joined the European Union in May 2004. She received 2,315 votes and was not elected.

=== Chess ===
Kass is a keen chess player. She was elected president of the Estonian Chess Federation for 8 consecutive years and currently serves as a councillor. She ran a campaign for Tallinn to host the 2008 Chess Olympics; however, Dresden, Germany was chosen instead.

=== Business ===
She was a part owner of her mother agency, Baltic Models.

== Personal life ==
From 2004 until 2014, Kass was in a relationship with Eric Lobron, a German chess grandmaster.

Her nephew, Antonio Sebastian Kass, is also a model and a musician.

Kass speaks Estonian, Russian and English. In November 2024, she announced the birth of her first child.
