= Colcci =

Brazilian fashion company

- Type: Public
- Industry: Clothing
- Founded: 1986
- Headquarters: Brusque, Brazil
- Products: Apparel
- Number of employees: 2,600 (2009)
- Website: colcci.com.br

Colcci is a Brazilian fashion company specialising in clothing and accessories. The company offers a wide range of products for both men and women, including jeans, t-shirts, dresses, skirts, and shoes. Colcci is one of the leading fashion brands in Brazil, and it has a strong presence in both the domestic market and international markets.

== History ==
Colcci was established in 1986 in Brusque, Santa Catarina, in Brazil. Since 1988, Adriana Zucco has been the creative director of Colcci's womenswear. In the early 2000s, the brand was acquired by AMC Têxtil group.

Gisele Bündchen has been the main female promotional model for the brand since 2005.

Colcci entered the US market through a distribution partnership with Macy's.

In October 2009, Colcci expanded its business in the United Kingdom.

In 2021, Colcci launched a Coca-Cola collection with Coca-Cola-branded clothes.

== Activities ==
Colcci operates in 31 countries, with 1,650 label stores and 20 franchise stores.

Colcci is heavily influenced by streetwear clothing targeted at young people, and is known for its sportswear, denims, accessories, and footwear. Although hip hop culture has an influence, designers for Colcci are also inspired by Mexican folk art, religious and historic images, and literature.
