= Bridget Hall =

American model

- Born: December 12, 1977 (age 48); Springdale, Arkansas, US
- Occupation: Model
- Modeling information
- Height: 5 ft 11 in (180 cm)
- Hair color: Dark blonde
- Eye color: Hazel
- Agency: One Management (New York); d'management group (Milan); Kim Dawson Agency (Dallas)

Bridget Hall (born December 12, 1977) is an American model.

== Early life ==
Hall was born in Springdale, Arkansas. At the age of 10, she was modeling in Dallas, Texas. At this time she was living in the suburb of Farmers Branch, where she briefly attended R. L. Turner High School. Shortly thereafter, she moved with her mother Donna Hall to New York City to pursue her modeling career.

== Career ==
By the age of 17, she was listed in Forbes as one of the "best ten" moneymaking supermodels along with Cindy Crawford and Christy Turlington.

Formerly with Ford Models, she signed with IMG Models and has appeared on fashion magazine covers such as Vogue, Harper's Bazaar, ELLE and Allure and in fashion shows in New York City, Paris and Milan. Hall has worked for a wide variety of clients including Pepsi, Guess Jeans, and Anne Klein. Hall is also signed to Independent Models in London and 1 Model Management in New York City.

She was included in the Sports Illustrated Swimsuit Issue from 2002 to 2005. She was the object/subject of Joanne Gair body painting works in several editions.
