= Michelle Alves =

Brazilian model (born 1978)

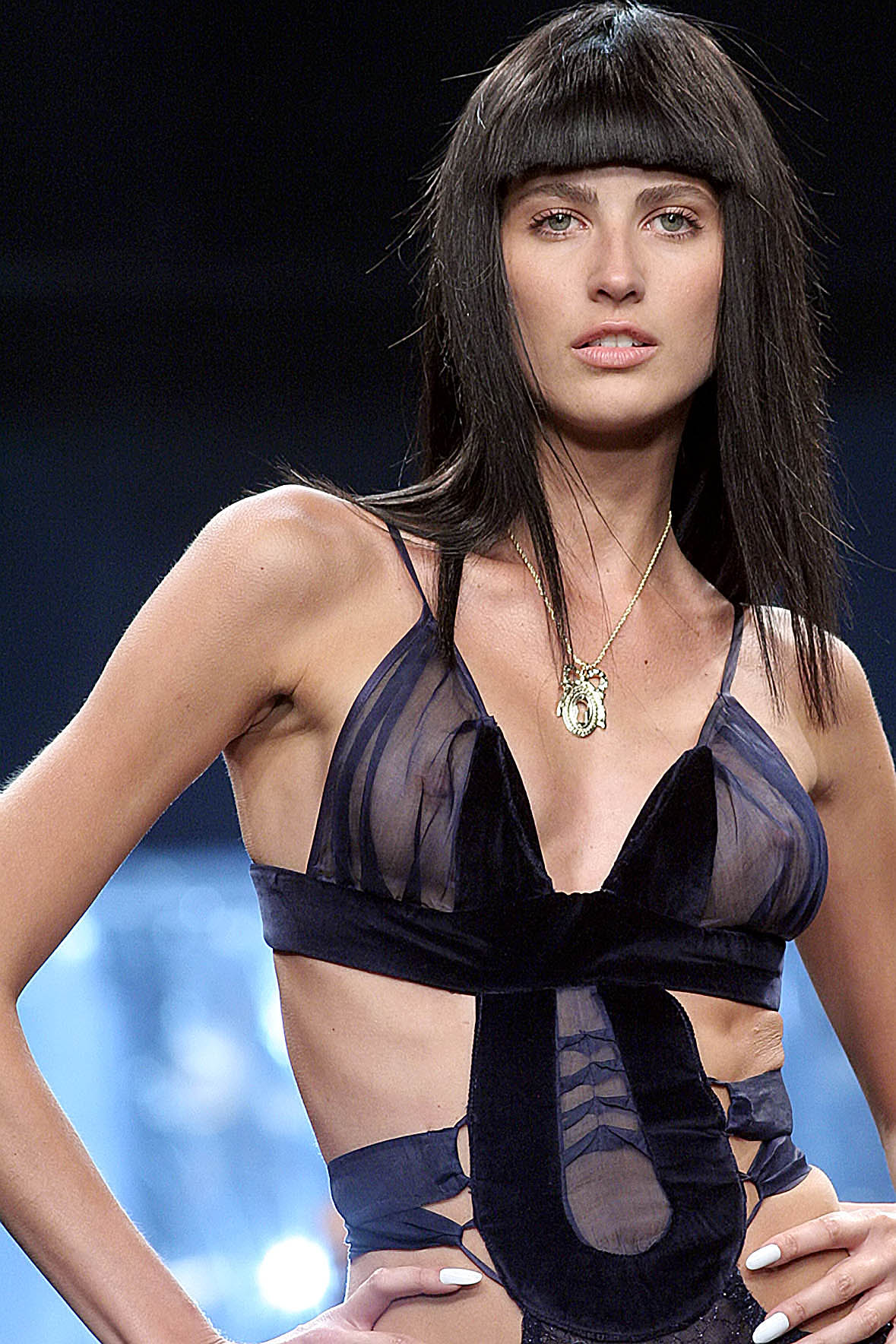
- Alves in January 2006
- Born: Michelle Kristine da Silva Alves; 19 September 1978 (age 48); Londrina, Paraná, Brazil
- Occupation: Model
- Spouse: Guy Oseary (m. 2006)
- Children: 4
- Modeling information
- Height: 1.80 m (5 ft 11 in)
- Hair color: Brown
- Eye color: Green
- Agency: The Lions (New York); IMG Models (Paris); Models 1 (London); Unique Models (Copenhagen); Model Management (Hamburg)

Michelle Kristine da Silva Alves (born September 19, 1978) is a Brazilian model.

== Biography ==
She was born in Londrina, Paraná, Brazil, as the daughter of a lawyer (mother) and an engineer (father). Alves was a student in civil engineering at Brazil's Londrina State University prior to moving to São Paulo, where she pursued modeling. She describes herself as "always a good student" and "Almost a nerd." Before studying engineering, she was a karate state champion. She is also a polyglot, fluent in Portuguese, Italian, French and English. Alves is currently living in Los Angeles, California.

== Career ==
Alves' modeling career began after her parents signed her up for a local beauty contest, which she won and went on to become a finalist in the 1996 Elite Model Look contest. After taking a break to continue her education for a year, she moved to São Paulo and then Paris where she began her international modeling career as a fit model for Yves Saint Laurent. In the late 1990s she made a small number of runway appearances for clients such as Celine, Jean-Louis Scherrer and Gianfranco Ferré.

In 2001 she moved to New York and received her first three international vogue covers. Alves quickly rose to top model status following her appearance on the cover of Vogue Italia in April 2002, which was photographed by Steven Meisel. In fashion circles she inherited the nickname "The Body", previously attributed to models Elle Macpherson and Gisele Bündchen, thanks to her physique.

She was featured in the 2003 and 2005 editions of the Sports Illustrated Swimsuit Issue, appeared in two editions of the Victoria's Secret Fashion Show, and was also featured in their catalogs and their book celebrating the company's 10th anniversary, entitled Sexy. She was invited to the Met Gala in 2009, 2011 and 2018.

Alves has signed contracts with Valentino, Christian Dior, Escada, Ralph Lauren, Missoni, Miss Sixty, Michael Kors, GAP, Emporio Armani, Michael Kors Swimwear, H&M, Calzedonia, AKRIS and holds a deal with Yves Saint Laurent for their fragrance Cinéma's campaign. She has worked with photographers such as Steven Meisel, Patrick Demarchelier, Bruce Weber, Gilles Bensimon, Mario Sorrenti, Nick Knight, Steven Klein, Phil Poynter, Walter Chin, Inez van Lamsweerde and Vinoodh Matadin and Richard Avedon.

Alves was featured on the covers of more than 100 major fashion magazines, including international editions of Vogue, Elle, Marie Claire, French, Esquire, L'Officiel, Harper's Bazaar, Amica and Glamour.
