= Mini Andén =

Swedish model, actress and television personality

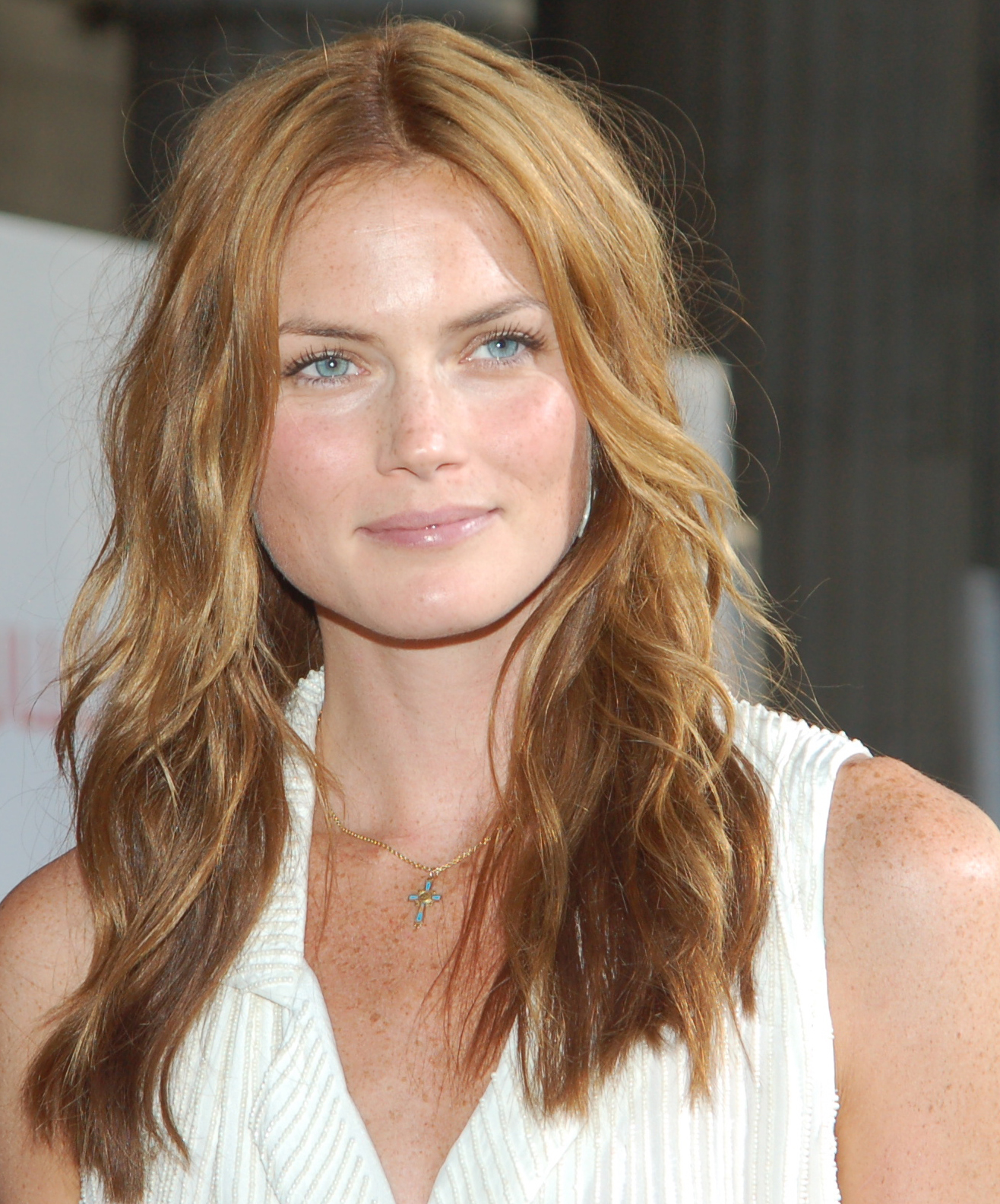
- Andén at the June 2009 premiere for The Proposal
- Born: Susanna Therese Andén; 7 June 1978 (age 48); Stockholm, Sweden
- Years active: 1993–present
- Spouse: Taber Schroeder (m. 2001)
- Children: 1
- Modeling information
- Height: 1.78 m (5 ft 10 in)
- Hair color: Auburn
- Eye color: Blue
- Agency: DNA Model Management (New York); Marilyn Agency (Paris); d'management group (Milan); Models 1 (London); Traffic Models (Barcelona); Model Management (Hamburg); MIKAs (Stockholm)

Susanna Clara Elisabeth "Mini" Andén (born 7 June 1978) is a Swedish model, actress, occasional host and producer.

== Biography ==
She was born in Stockholm and began modeling at the age of ten, joining Elite Model Management when she was fifteen. She has been on the cover of many fashion magazines including Vogue, Marie Claire, Cosmopolitan, and ELLE. She has been featured in fashion campaigns for Calvin Klein, Donna Karan, BCBG, Louis Vuitton, Hugo Boss, Gucci, and Victoria's Secret. She is currently seen as the face for Giorgio Armani's perfume Armani Code for Women.

She was a judge in the Miss Universe beauty pageant in 2001. She was the host of the Swedish section of Scandinavia's Next Top Model which premiered February 16, 2005. Andén has appeared in a handful of films and produced the 2003 short film Buffoon, which starred her husband Taber Schroeder. She appeared in MyNetworkTV's Fashion House in which she played self-destructive model Tania Ford and in NBC's Chuck as undercover DEA agent Carina Miller.

Recently, she participated as a celebrity dancer in Let's Dance 2025 broadcast on TV4.

She married model Taber Schroeder in 2001, and they live together in Los Angeles.

== Filmography ==
=== Film ===
Year	Title	Role	Notes
2003	Bufoon		Executive Producer
2004	Ocean's Twelve	Supermodel	
2004	Point&Shoot	Mini	
2005	Au suivant!	La femme de Riley	
2005	Prime	Sue	
2008	Tropic Thunder	Grossman Secretary - Grossman's Office	
2008	My Best Friend's Girl	Lizzy	
2009	G-Force	Saber's Assistant	
2011	The Mechanic	Sarah	

=== Television ===
Year	Title	Role	Notes
2003	Trend Watch	Host	
2003	Victoria's Secret Fashion Show	Model	
2005	N.C.I.S.	Hannah Bressling	Episode: "Model Behavior"
2006	Monk	Natasia Zorelle	Episode: "Mr. Monk Goes to a Fashion Show"
2006	Fashion House	Tania Ford	32 episodes
2006	Ugly Betty	Aerin	Episode: "Fake Plastic Show"
2007	Dirt	Holt's Co-star	2 episodes
2007	Shark	Katie Paget	Episode: "Porn Free"
2007	Entourage	Samantha	Episode: "Malibooty"
2007, 2010, 2011	Chuck	Carina Miller	4 episodes
2008	Rules of Engagement	Melissa	Episode: "Pimp My Bride"
2008–2009	My Boys	Elsa	6 episodes
2009	Knight Rider	Alexandria Pachinko	Episode: "I Love the Knight Life"
2009–2010	CSI: Miami	Anna Kitson	2 episodes
2010	Nip/Tuck	Willow Banks	Episode: "Willow Banks
2011	Bones	Brittany Stephenson	Episode: "The Finder"
2012	Solsidan	Kia	Episode: "Episode #3.9"
2025	Let's Dance 2025	Herself	Contestant
