= Audrey Marnay =

French actress and model (born 1980)

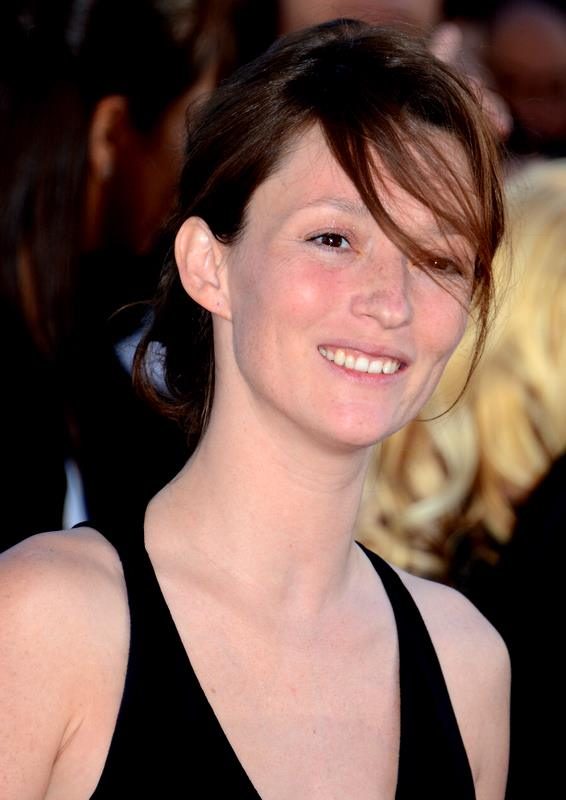
- Marnay at the 2013 Cannes Film Festival
- Born: 14 October 1980 (age 45); Chartres, France
- Modeling information
- Height: 1.75 m (5 ft 9 in)
- Agency: Wilhelmina Models (New York); IMG Models (Paris, Milan, London)

Audrey Marnay (born 14 October 1980 in Chartres, Eure-et-Loir) is a French actress and model.

== Career ==
At the age of 15, Marnay started working at a modeling agency in Paris. A year later, she was named top model and was featured on 32 pages and the cover of Vogue Italy, photographed by Steven Meisel. She has also been featured on the pages and covers of Vogue, Elle, Harper's Bazaar, and luxury brands such as Chanel, Versace, Lanvin, Calvin Klein, Valentin, and Longchamp.

She has worked with directors including Patrice Leconte, Raoul Ruiz, David Foenkinos, Stefan Liberski, Arielle Dombasle, and Cedric Klapisch. In 2014, George Clooney selected her to star in his movie The Monuments Men.

Marnay is involved in multiple creative pursuits: in fashion (capsule collections for Claudie Pierlot), jewelry design (Etername), and singing (Alain Chamfort Manureva), and she is the muse for Air in their video clips. The French artist Pierre Huyghe cast her in The Host and The Cloud[1]. Marney became the spokesperson for "Les Enfants de Bam" in 2010.

In 2021, Marnay revealed herself as the woman depicted in the cover artwork for the 2001 album Jane Doe by metalcore band Converge, claiming in an Instagram post that a photograph of her from the May 2001 issue of Marie Claire Italy, taken by Dutch fashion photographer Jan Welters, was the original source artwork used by the band's vocalist and cover artist Jacob Bannon.

She is the mother of three children, two of which were born in 2000 and in 2003 and were fathered by her partner Alexander de Betak. She had another child in 2014 with Virgile Bramly, with whom she has been married since 2011.

== Filmography ==
- How does it make you feel by Antoine Bardou-Jacquet for Air (2001)
- Nuages by Michel Gondry for Air France (2002)
- Bunker Paradise by Stefan Liberski Laeticia
- My Best Friend by Patrice Leconte (2006)
- Tony Zoreil by Valentin Potier (2007)
- Paris by Cédric Klapisch (Marjolaine 2008)
- The Monuments Men by George Clooney (2014)
