= Maggie Rizer =

American model (born 1978)

- Born: Margaret Mary Rizer; January 9, 1978 (age 48); New York City, U.S.
- Spouse: Alex Mehran (m. 2010)
- Children: 4
- Modeling information
- Height: 1.78 m (5 ft 10 in)
- Hair color: Blonde (natural)
- Eye color: Blue
- Agency: Ford Models (New York); Ford Models (Paris); d'management group (Milan); Models 1(London)

Maggie Rizer (born January 9, 1978) is an American model and an activist for AIDS-related causes as well as for Operation Smile.

== Early life ==
Margaret Mary Rizer was born to Maureen and Kevin Rizer in Staten Island, New York. Her parents divorced before she was a year old when her father announced he was gay. A decade later her mother remarried, to John Breen, and she was raised in Watertown, New York. Her extended family includes four siblings: Julia, Patricia, Katie, and Jake. The family, who lives in upstate New York, appeared in a 2001 Teen Vogue layout. Rizer was fourteen when her openly gay father died of AIDS, and she has since become involved in AIDS awareness.

== Modeling career ==
=== Rise to fame ===
Her high school graduation portrait was hung in Burns Photography studio and in the local mall. Neighbors saw the photo and encouraged the girl's mother to send the photo to the Ford Modeling Agency in New York City. Rizer's pale skin, covered in freckles, and her bright blue eyes caught the modeling world's attention.

She initially turned down modeling offers to continue her studies at the State University of New York at Geneseo and the Rochester Institute of Technology. Her hair is naturally strawberry blonde, which she dyed red to attract the attention of Italian Vogue and photographer Steven Meisel. They booked her for her first cover and 20-page couture layout in September 1997. She was also featured on the April 1999 cover of American Vogue with Kate Moss. Her second American Vogue cover was in November 2000 with models Carmen Kass, Angela Lindvall, and Frankie Rayder. The same year she was up for the 2000 VH1/Vogue "Model of the Year" award. Carmen Kass was the eventual winner. She has appeared in many fashion spreads and on the covers of dozens of fashion magazines including Elle, Lucky, Vogue, and Flare.

She has walked the runway for Fendi, Calvin Klein, Donna Karan, Chanel, Marc Jacobs, Oscar De La Renta, Miu Miu, Michael Kors, Prada, Jean Paul Gaultier, Dolce & Gabbana, Max Mara, Jil Sander, Blumarine, Céline, Givenchy, Louis Vuitton, Gucci, Alexander McQueen, Ralph Lauren, Valentino, Missoni, Yves Saint Laurent, Versace, Balenciaga, Carolina Herrera, Alberta Ferretti, and Viktor & Rolf. Rizer has appeared in fashion campaigns for Versace, Prada, Calvin Klein, Valentino SpA, Céline, Louis Vuitton, Balenciaga, Escada, Lanvin, Clinique, Tommy Hilfiger, Ann Taylor, Fendi, Max Mara, Gap, Dooney & Bourke, and Neiman Marcus.

She was at the peak of her modeling career in the late 1990s and early 2000s. She has done limited film and television work, appearing briefly in Sex and the City Season 6 episode ("Let There Be Light"); also briefly on America's Next Top Model Cycle 2 Episode 2 ("The Girl Who Floats Like a Butterfly and Stings Like a Bee") while demonstrating proper runway walk to the contestants. She had a more prominent appearance on the CW show Stylista Episode 6 ("Model Behavior") while giving the contestants an idea what it's like to cater to the demands of a top model client. She appeared in a scene (later deleted) in the film Zoolander, asking Ben Stiller's title character (Derek Zoolander) to "come and join our sex party!" with a group of models in a limousine.

=== Comeback ===
After a hiatus, Rizer returned to the industry and graced the cover of Singaporean L'Officiel in October 2008, lensed by Leslie Kee. People, in its December issue, ran a story about Rizer's attempts at a modeling comeback. In late 2009, she began appearing in advertisements for Dooney and Bourke. In 2010, she featured prominently on the website for the L.L.Bean SIGNATURE line and in the print catalog.

In March 2014, Rizer returned to the runway, walking for Louis Vuitton at autumn/winter Paris Fashion Week, and in May at the house's 2015 cruise show in Monaco. In September, Rizer opened for Michael Kors at Spring 2015 New York Fashion Week. Rizer appeared among other "Icons" on the cover of the September 2014 issue of Vogue Japan. Rizer was featured on the cover of the November issue of Numéro Tokyo. In 2015, Rizer walked for Prabal Gurung at Spring 2016 New York Fashion Week and in August, was shot by Inez and Vinoodh for American Vogue. In 2016, Rizer appeared in a holiday campaign for Banana Republic.

== Personal life ==
Rizer married American businessman Alex Mehran on September 18, 2010, in Lake Placid, New York. They have four children and live in San Ramon, California.

=== Loss of modeling fortune ===
Maggie earned around $20,000 per fashion show and her day rate started at $30,000. She reportedly amassed a fortune of $7 million in only five years. At age 20, Rizer and her mother hired a New York City financial manager to handle her money in exchange for five percent of her earnings. Weeks later, her stepfather John Breen, who was in the insurance industry, told her that this was a waste of money and that he wanted to handle all of her finances. Breen had a serious drinking problem, however. The family would assume he was at work as he worked for himself at a small local insurance agency. According to him, after he lost his savings, he turned to Rizer's money and sometimes lost over $60,000 of it per day. No one but John was aware of these losses.

Maureen Brennan forced her husband into alcohol rehab and while he was gone, she came across receipts, documents, and forged checks in his trashcan at his office. She slowly unraveled the details of his addiction and discovered that Breen had gambled away all of Maggie's modeling income and the money Maggie had inherited upon the death of her biological father, Kevin, from AIDS in 1992. In 2004, her stepfather was convicted of grand larceny and conspiracy to defraud and was sentenced to sixteen to forty-eight months in prison. The family was left with no money. Ford, and then her new modeling agency, IMG, encouraged Rizer to seek therapy. Rizer mostly dropped out of modeling for the next five years. In consequence, Maureen Brennan briefly went on public assistance to support her family. An article about Rizer appeared in New York Magazine (April/May 2005) and online.

== Filmography ==
Film
Year	Film	Role	Notes
2001	Zoolander	Model	
Television
Year	Title	Role	Notes
2004	Sex and the City	Party Girl	1 episode
2004	America's Next Top Model	Guest Judge	cycle 2
2008	Stylista	Herself	
