= Eugenia Volodina =

Russian model

- Born: September 23, 1984 (age 42); Kazan, Tatarstan, Russian SSR, Soviet Union
- Occupation: Model
- Years active: 1998–present
- Children: 1
- Modeling information
- Height: 1.80 m (5 ft 11 in)
- Hair color: Brown
- Eye color: Blue-Green

Eugenia "Zhenya" Evgenievna Volodina (September 23, 1984, Russian: Евгения Володина) is a Russian Model. Volodina started her career in 1998 and later in the 2000 she was signed by a Parisian modelling agency. Volodina managed to carry the Victoria's Secret wings, has modelled for Victoria's Secret in 2002, 2003, 2005, 2007 and was the only non angel to open a segment in 2005.

== Early life ==
Eugenia Volodina was born on September 23, 1984, in Kazan, Tatarstan, Russia. Volodina was raised a Christian and after finishing school, wanted to pursue university.

== Career ==
=== Early work 1998-2000 ===
Volodina started her career in 1998 when she walked in an open call at a Russian casting agency. Volodina entered in the Miss Advertising contest where a Moscow Photographer Alexei Vasiliev took a few photos and sent them to a modelling agency in Paris.

In 2000 she was signed by a Parisian modelling agency and decided to pursue her career there.

=== Further recognition, 2002-present ===
In 2002 the photographer Steven Meisel noticed Volodina and featured her on the cover of Vogue Italia. This cover launched her career, Volodina then was given the nickname "Zhenya" which is known and Zhenial (genius).

In the same year Volodina took part in the same Gucci campaign as the fellow supermodel Natalia Vodianova and got to open the Gucci fall/winter show in Milan.

Volodina was also photographed by photographers such as Patrick Demarchelier, Irving Penn and Steven Klein.

Since 2002, Volodina has posed with numerous fashion magazines such as Vanity Fair, Elle, Vogue, i-D, Harper's Bazaar, and Numero.

Her runway credits include many top fashion houses and designers.
