= Fernanda Tavares =

Brazilian model (born 1980)

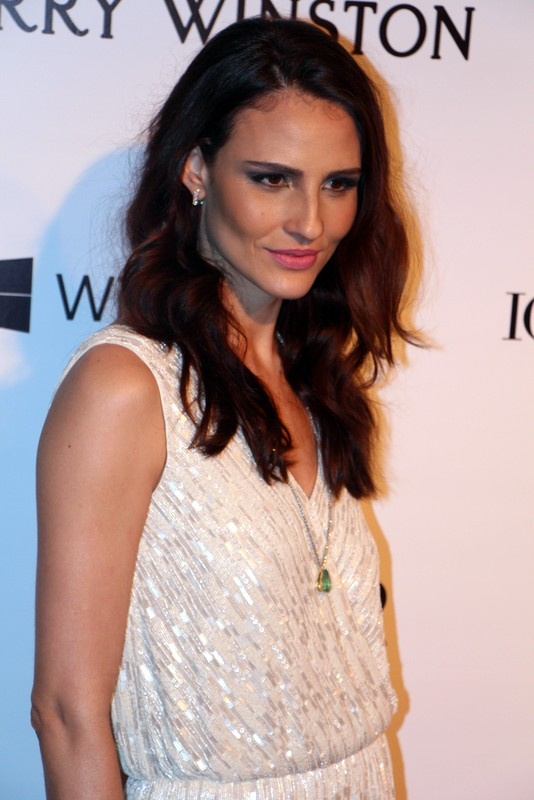
- Tavares in 2015
- Born: Fernanda Tavares Vasconcelos; September 22, 1980 (age 46); Natal, Rio Grande do Norte, Brazil
- Occupation: Model
- Years active: 1995–present
- Spouse: Murilo Rosa (m. 2007)
- Modeling information
- Height: 1.78 m (5 ft 10 in)
- Hair color: Brown
- Eye color: Brown
- Agency: IMG Models (New York); Women Management (Paris); d'management group (Milan); Next Model Management (London); Francina Models (Barcelona); Mega Model Agency (Hamburg); PARS Management (Munchen); Stockholmsgruppen (Stockholm)

Fernanda Tavares Vasconcelos (born September 22, 1980) is a Brazilian model who gained international recognition in the 2000s. She emerged during a wave of Brazilian models known for a sun-kissed, curvaceous physique that challenged traditional runway standards of extreme thinness, alongside peers such as Gisele Bündchen and Caroline Ribeiro.

== Biography and career ==
Tavares began her modeling career at a young age and won the Elite Look of the Year contest at age 13, which led to opportunities to pursue modeling professionally in São Paulo and abroad. By 1998, at the age of 17, she was appearing on the covers of major fashion magazines, including L'Officiel Paris, Marie Claire (U.S. and Deutsch editions), and Vogue Paris, and had signed with Marilyn Modeling Agency in New York City and Paris.

She walked the runways for numerous leading designers such as Chanel, Emanuel Ungaro, Versace, Blumarine, Chloé, Christian Lacroix, Prada, Salvatore Ferragamo, Valentino and John Galliano, and appeared in editorial spreads for fashion magazines including Elle, Cosmopolitan, Allure and the Sports Illustrated Swimsuit Issue. Among her notable modeling achievements, Tavares participated in the Victoria's Secret Fashion Show from 2000 to 2005 and was part of the group of Brazilian models that helped establish Brazil's prominence in international fashion runway shows of the era.

In addition to runway and editorial work, Tavares worked as a television host; she presented the Brazilian fashion‑and‑lifestyle show Missão MTV, which was modelled after the American series Queer Eye for the Straight Guy and aired on MTV Brasil.

After a period focused on her family, she returned to modeling and appeared in Brazilian fashion events, including São Paulo Fashion Week, and renewed her professional affiliations with major agencies and brands.

During her international career, Tavares secured a landmark contract with L'Oréal Paris, becoming one of the first Brazilian models to appear in global beauty campaigns alongside figures such as Beyoncé and Catherine Deneuve, which expanded her recognition beyond runway work into commercial advertising.

She was also noted for her principled stance against the use of animal fur in fashion, a position that led her to collaborate with People for the Ethical Treatment of Animals (PETA) in anti‑fur campaigns.

During her time on international runways, Tavares spoke openly about the intense pressure to conform to strict body standards in the fashion industry. In a 2017 interview with Vogue Brasil, she described experiences in which she was excluded from castings because her body was perceived as having "too many curves" compared to industry norms, and recounted taking extreme measures in her youth to lose weight to meet fashion show expectations.

Tavares also recalled instances of severe dieting and use of laxatives before runway shows in an attempt to rapidly reduce weight, which she later recognized as detrimental to her health.

In 2016, she discussed in an interview with RedeTV! how media coverage of her body, including criticism of cellulite after a São Paulo Fashion Week appearance, affected her emotionally, highlighting the scrutiny models often face regarding body image.

== Personal life ==
Tavares is married to Brazilian actor Murilo Rosa; the couple has two sons.
