= Alessandra Ambrosio =

Brazilian model (born 1981)

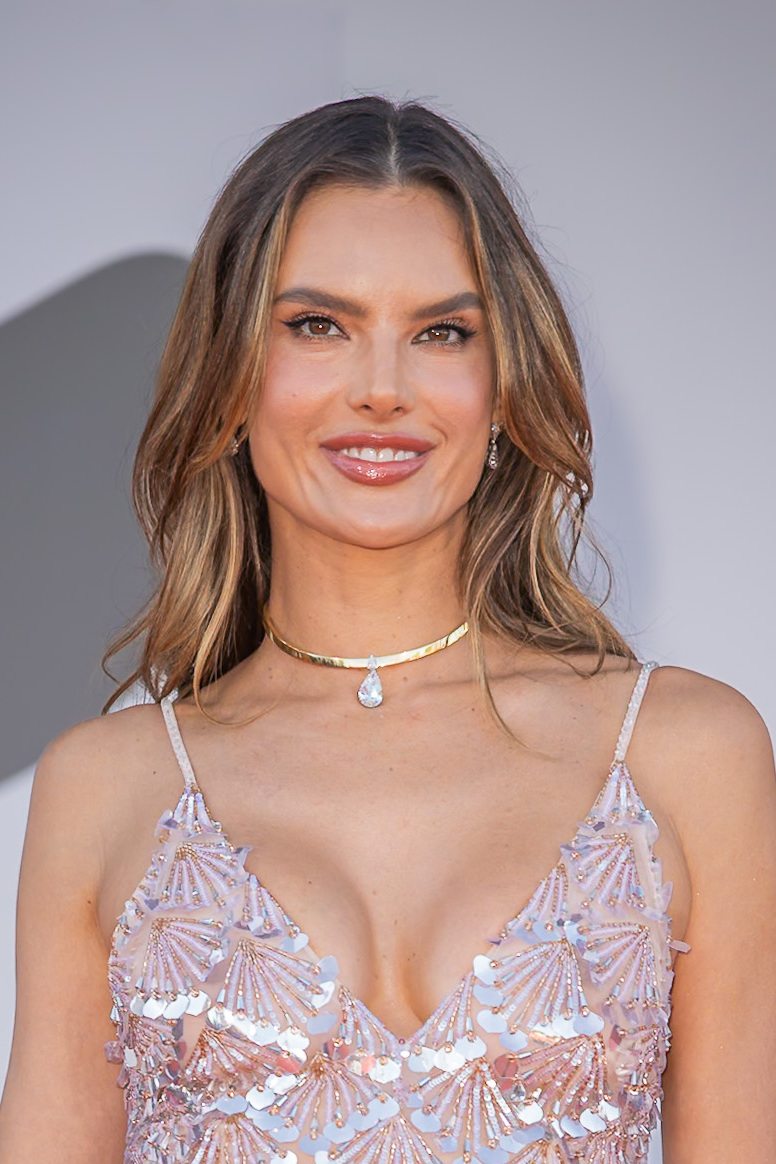
- Ambrosio in 2025
- Born: Alessandra Corine Ambrósio; 11 April 1981 (age 45); Erechim, Rio Grande do Sul, Brazil
- Citizenship: Brazil; US (naturalized)
- Years active: 1996–present
- Partners: Jamie Mazur (2005–2018); Buck Palmer (eng. 2026)
- Children: 2
- Modeling information
- Height: 1.77 m (5 ft 9 1/2 in)
- Hair color: Brown
- Eye color: Brown
- Agency: Creative Artists Agency (New York, Los Angeles); VIVA Model Management (Barcelona); Clyne Model Management (Auckland); Persepective Management (London); Priscilla's Model Management (Sydney); Way Model Management (São Paulo)
- Website: www.alessandraambrosio.com.br

Alessandra Corine Ambrósio (Brazilian Portuguese: [aleˈsɐ̃dɾɐ ɐ̃ˈbɾɔzju]; born 11 April 1981) is a Brazilian and American model. She is known for her work with Victoria's Secret and was chosen as the first spokesmodel for the company's PINK line. She was a Victoria's Secret Angel from 2004 to 2017 and has modeled for fashion houses such as Christian Dior, Armani, Ralph Lauren, and Next.

In May 2007, People included her on its list of "100 Most Beautiful People in the World", followed in June 2007 with FHM including her at number five on its list of "100 Sexiest Women". In September 2012, MODELS.com honoured her work by placing Ambrosio on its list of models considered icons in the fashion industry. That same year, Ambrosio was ranked number five on Forbes' list of the highest-paid models, estimated to have earned US$6.6 million (equivalent to $9.3 million in 2025) over the 12 months ending May 2012.

== Early life ==
Ambrosio was born on 11 April 1981 in Erechim, Rio Grande do Sul, Brazil, to Lucilda and Luiz Ambrósio. She has a younger sister named Aline. Their paternal grandfather was an Italian emigrant from Padua, and their paternal grandmother was a Polish emigrant.

Having always been insecure about her large ears, Ambrosio had cosmetic surgery to have her ears pinned back at the age of 11 and suffered complications two years later. She enrolled in a modelling class at the age of 12. She was one of 20 finalists for the 1995 Elite Model Look national competition for Brazil.

== Career ==
=== Modeling ===
When Ambrosio was 12 years old, she partook in modeling classes and then began modeling for Dilson Stein at age 15. Competing in Brazil's Elite Model Look competition started her modeling career in earnest. Her first notable modeling job was shooting the cover of Brazilian Elle magazine. Elite passed along some of her Polaroids to Guess which led her booking the Millennium GUESS? campaign.

Ambrosio has since appeared in advertising campaigns for Gucci, Dolce & Gabbana, Calvin Klein, Oscar de la Renta, Christian Dior, Escada, Fendi, Giorgio Armani, Guess, Emporio Armani, Moschino, Gap, Hugo Boss, Ralph Lauren, Saks Fifth Avenue, Macy's, Revlon, and the Pirelli Calendar. She has walked the catwalks for designers such as Prada, Chanel, Dolce & Gabbana, Givenchy, Christian Lacroix, Bottega Veneta, Escada, Tommy Hilfiger, Christian Dior, Marc Jacobs, Louis Vuitton, Balmain, Ralph Lauren, Halston, Vivienne Westwood, Giles Deacon, Kenzo, Emanuel Ungaro, Philipp Plein, and Oscar de la Renta. She has appeared in numerous international magazine covers, including Cosmopolitan, Elle, GQ, Harper's Bazaar, Marie Claire, Ocean Drive, Vogue, and was the only model to appear on the cover of Glamour in the United States in 2006.

In 2004, Ambrosio launched her line of swimwear called Alessandra Ambrosio by Sais, a division of Rosa Chá. It sold 10,000 units in its first month on the market. Ambrosio was the face for the UK company Next and starred in their first television campaign in 12 years.

In 2006, Ambrosio appeared on The Tyra Banks Show and said that the ear surgery she had as a kid was a bad experience and has discouraged her from ever getting plastic surgery again.

On the July 2009 cover of Marie Claire, Ambrosio appeared in a spread with Sacha Baron Cohen to promote Baron Cohen's 2009 film Brüno.

Ambrosio became the face of Brazilian sportswear brand Colcci costarring with Ashton Kutcher in a denim ad. She was ranked No. 5 on Forbes' The World's Top-Earning Models list, with an estimated earnings of $5 million over 2010–2011. In October 2011, Ambrosio became Vogue's blogger, commenting on her wardrobe by posting one photo of herself each day for a month. On 12 August 2012, she appeared in the 2012 Summer Olympics closing ceremony representing the Brazilian fashion tradition on the handover segment to Rio de Janeiro City.

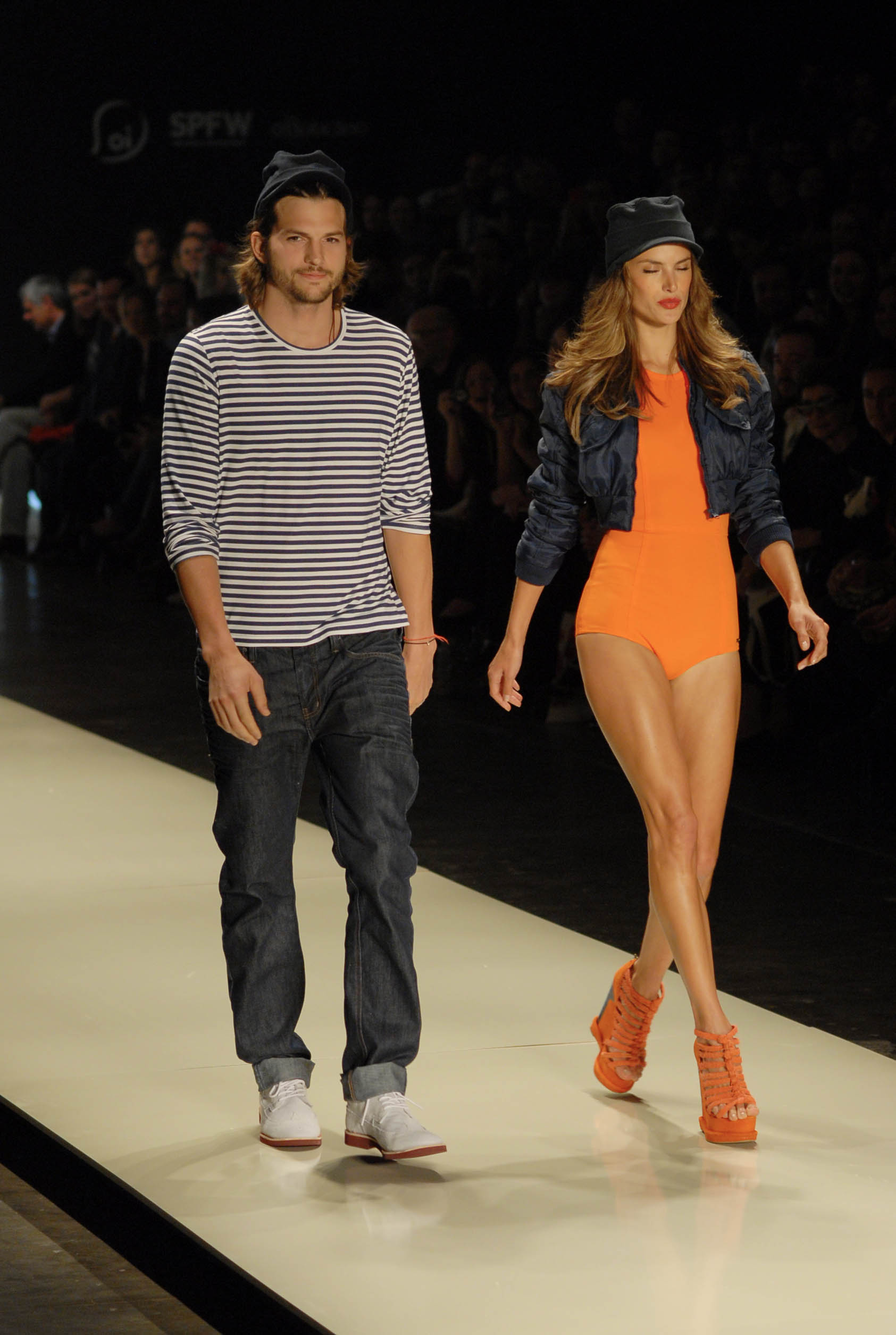
Ambrosio walking the runway with Ashton Kutcher at São Paulo Fashion Week in 2011

In spring 2014, Ambrosio launched her own fashion and lifestyle brand named Ále by Alessandra in a collaboration with American retailer Cherokee. The line features casual wear to formal attire and is aimed at females between 18 and 35 years old. The apparel line was first shown by Southern California-based retailer Planet Blue. For this brand, Ambrosio used her intellectual property company, Silver Sunrise LLC, which works with Cherokee as its global licensing agent.

Ambrosio appeared in the February 2016 issue of GQ alongside Portuguese footballer Cristiano Ronaldo.

Ambrosio was chosen by NBC alongside fellow Brazilian model Adriana Lima as the channel's food and culture correspondents for the 2016 Summer Olympics.

==== Victoria's Secret ====
By 2006, Ambrosio was selected as the first spokesmodel for the Victoria's Secret "PINK" line. In 2005, she walked the Victoria's Secret Fashion Show runway wearing lingerie made entirely out of candy. In the 2008 edition of the Fashion Show, she walked the runway three months after giving birth to her first child, and opened the show the following year in 2009. The 2011 show saw her wearing the heaviest wings (30 lb, 14 kg) ever made for the show while pregnant with her second child.

In 2012, Ambrosio was chosen to wear the "Fantasy Bra". The Floral Fantasy Bra, crafted by London Jewelers, was valued at $2.5 million. It featured amethysts, rubies, sapphires, and diamonds all set in rose and yellow gold.

In 2014, she was chosen to wear Fantasy Bra, alongside fellow model Adriana Lima. The Dream Fantasy Bra, crafted by Mouawad featured diamonds, rubies, sapphires, and gemstones, held together with 18-karat gold strings. Both of the bras was valued at $2 million.

After the Victoria's Secret Fashion Show in 2017, Ambrosio posted on her Instagram that she will be retiring from walking Victoria's Secret Fashion Shows.

In October 2024, seven years after her retirement, Ambrosio returned to the Victoria's Secret Fashion Show. The following October, she walked for the brand once more, marking her 18th appearance, in 2025, she participated in the Victoria's Secret Fashion Show for a 19th time and in the 2026 Victoria's Secret Fashion Show for 20th time.

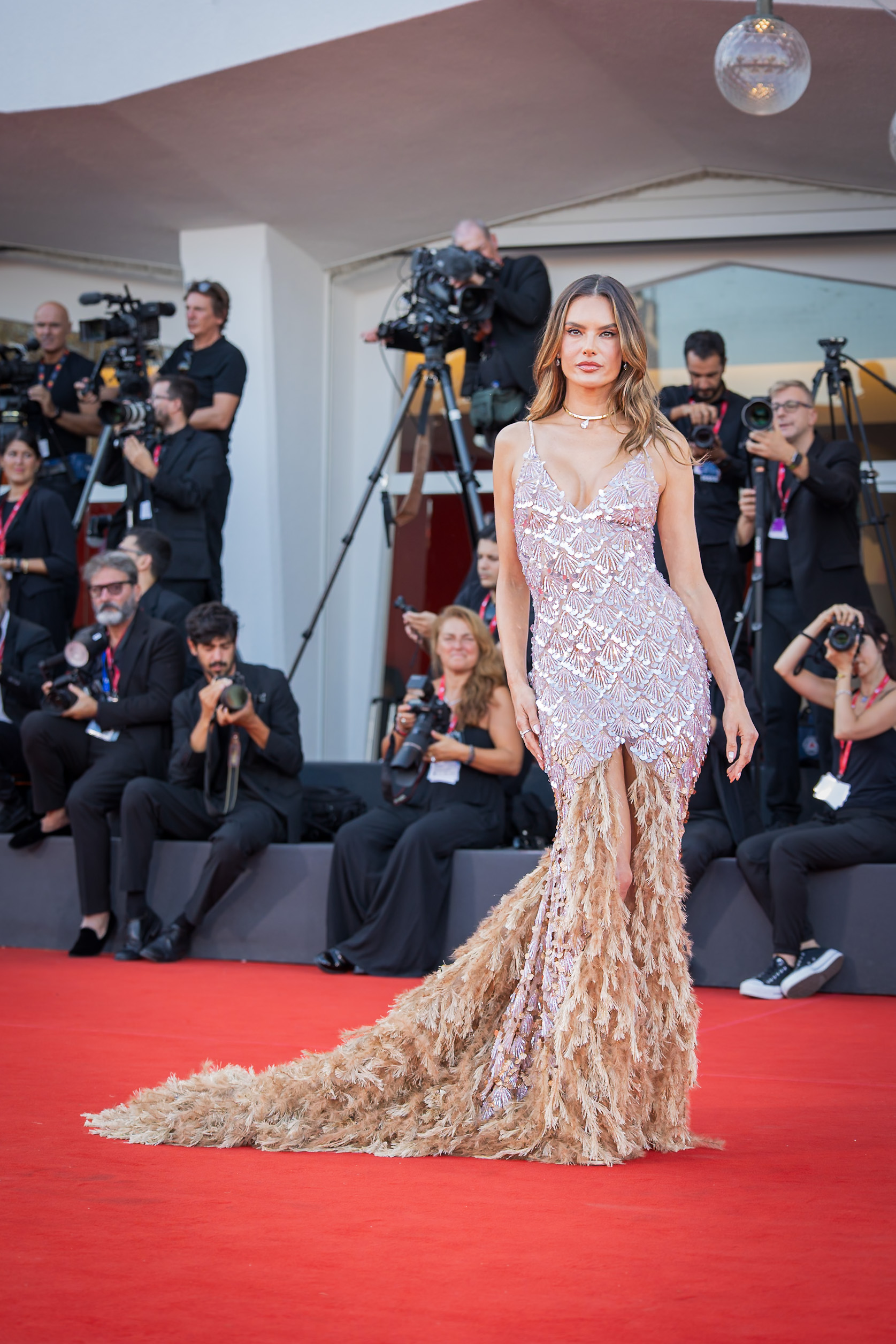
Ambrosio during the 82nd Venice International Film Festival

=== Television and film appearances ===
Ambrosio has made several television appearances, notably a cameo as herself on HBO's Entourage; The Late Late Show with Craig Kilborn; Late Night with Conan O'Brien; A guest judge on Project Runway Season 2: Team Lingerie and twice on The Tyra Banks Show. She also appeared on America's Next Top Model in the series' 20th cycle.

In 2006, she had a cameo in the box-office hit film Casino Royale, appearing briefly as Tennis Girl #1. Ambrosio guest-starred on the How I Met Your Mother episode "The Yips" on 26 November 2007 with her fellow Victoria's Secret Angels Adriana Lima, Selita Ebanks, Marisa Miller, Miranda Kerr, and Heidi Klum. She also made a cameo appearance during the New Girl episode "Prince".

Ambrosio made her acting debut in the Brazilian telenovela Verdades Secretas, which premiered on Rede Globo on 8 June 2015, playing the role of former top model Samia. She appeared as herself in the 2016 film, Teenage Mutant Ninja Turtles: Out of the Shadows.

== Personal life ==
Ambrosio became engaged to American businessman Jamie Mazur, founder of RE/DONE jeans, in 2008. The couple have a daughter (born 2008) and a son (born 2012). Ambrosio announced on 27 March 2018 that she and Mazur had split.

Ambrosio serves as an ambassador for the National Multiple Sclerosis Society.

In March 2019, Ambrosio launched her beachwear brand, GAL Floripa, in partnership with her sister, Aline, and her childhood friend, Gisele Cória.

In November 2020, Ambrosio revealed that she had acquired American citizenship.

In summer 2026, Ambrosio got engaged to Australian jewellery designer Buck Palmer.

== Filmography ==
=== Film ===
Year	Title	Role	Notes
2006	Casino Royale	Tennis Girl	
2015	Daddy's Home	Karen Mayron	
2016	Teenage Mutant Ninja Turtles: Out of the Shadows	Herself	
2017	Double Dutchess	Herself	
2017	Daddy's Home 2	Karen Mayron	

=== Television ===
Year	Title	Role	Notes
2004	The Late Late Show	Herself	1 episode
2005–2006	The Tyra Banks Show	Herself	2 episodes
2005	Project Runway	Herself	Episode: "Team Lingerie"
2006	Late Night with Conan O'Brien	Herself	1 episode
2007	Entourage	Victoria's Secret Angel #1	Episode: "Less Than 30"
2007	How I Met Your Mother	Herself	Episode: "The Yips"
2010	Gossip Girl	Top Model	Episode: "The Undergraduates"
2013	America's Next Top Model	Herself	Episode: "The Guy Who Gets a Weave"
2014	New Girl	Herself	Episode: "Prince"
2015	Australia's Next Top Model	Herself	1 episode
2015	Verdades Secretas	Samia	Recurring role (season 1)
2018	Germany's Next Topmodel	Herself	Episode: "Drag Edition"
2018	The Final Table	Herself	Episode: "Brazil"
2019	MasterChef	Herself	Episode: "Hot & Spicy"
2019	American Housewife	Young Katy	Season 4, Episode 1 'The Minivan' Cameo
2020	Germany's Next Topmodel	Herself	Episode: "Everybody comes to Hollywood"

=== Music videos ===
Year	Title	Artist
2016	"M.I.L.F. $"	Fergie
2016	"Wolves"	Kanye West
