= Karolína Kurková =

Czech model

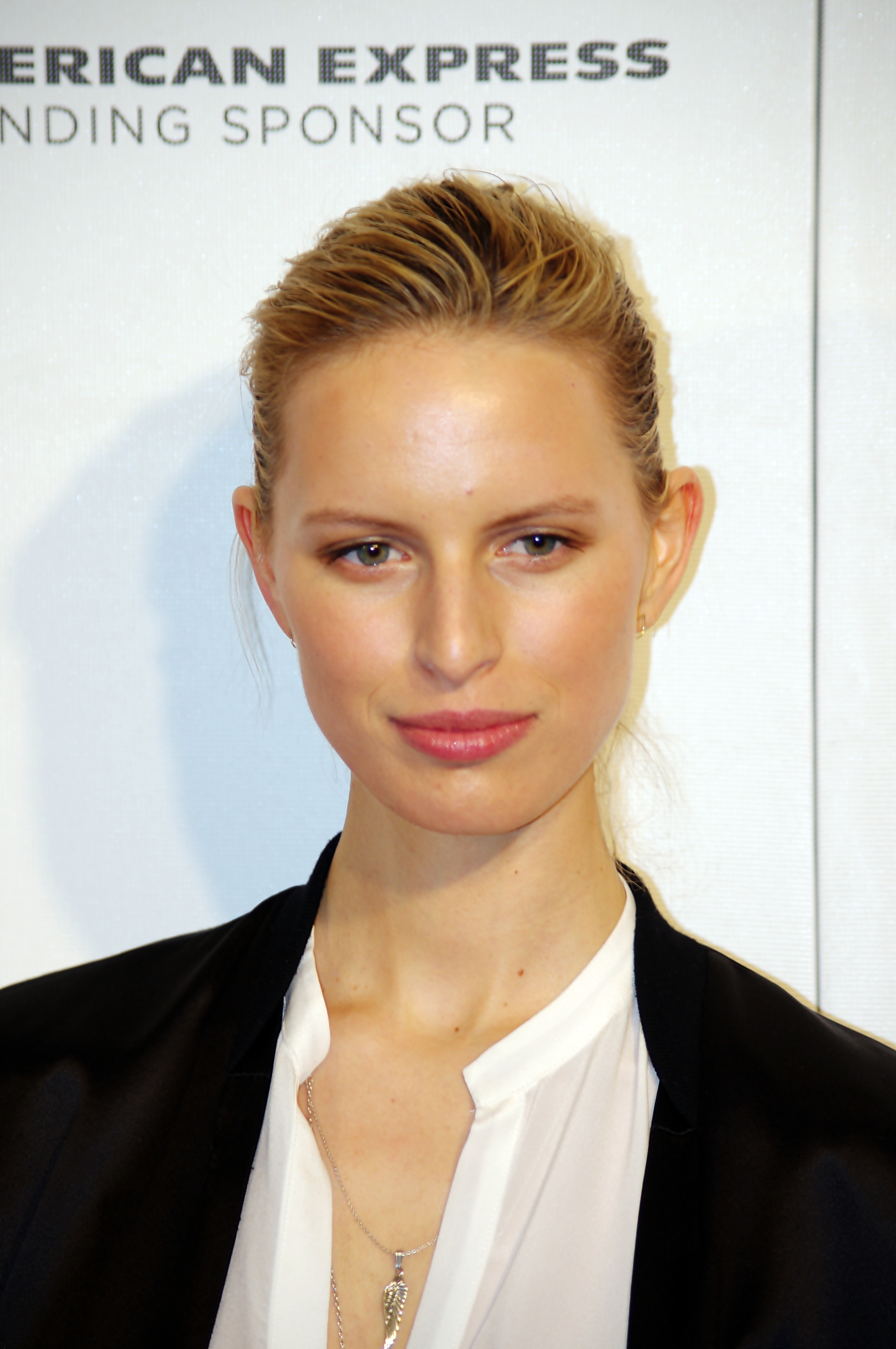
- Kurková in 2011
- Born: 28 February 1984 (age 42); Děčín, Czechoslovakia
- Citizenship: Czech Republic; United States
- Spouse: Archie Drury (m. 2009)
- Children: 3
- Modeling information
- Height: 1.80 m (5 ft 11 in)
- Hair color: Blonde
- Eye color: Green
- Agency: Ford Models (New York); Marilyn Agency (Paris) d'management group (Milan); Storm Model Management (London); Stockholmsgruppen (Stockholm)

Karolína Kurková (Czech pronunciation: [ˈkaroliːna ˈkurkovaː]; born 28 February 1984) is a Czech actress and model known for her work as a former Victoria's Secret Angel and Vogue cover star. Mario Testino praised the "proportions of her body and her face, as well as her energy level", which he said "ma[de] her a model who could fit almost into any moment". Vogue editor Anna Wintour called her the "next supermodel".

In 2007, Kurková was among the world's top-earning models, having earned an estimated $5 million. She placed 6th in the Forbes annual list of the highest-earning models that same year.

== Early life ==
Karolína Kurková was born in Pardubice, Czechoslovakia, to Josef Kurka, a Czech basketball player, and a Slovak mother. While Kurková was young, she was made fun of for her height. But after a friend sent photos of Kurková to an agency in Prague, at age 15, she landed a runway appearance, as well as gigs for commercial and print advertising. She later traveled to Milan to gain more experience and signed a modeling contract with Miuccia Prada.

In September 1999, Kurková appeared in the American edition of fashion and lifestyle magazine Vogue, and, after moving to New York City at the age of 17, appeared on the cover of the February 2001 edition.

== Career ==
=== Modeling ===
Following her Vogue cover, Kurková became recognized at haute couture fashion shows. Additionally, the lingerie brand Victoria's Secret chose her to be a part of 2000's fashion show webcast, though she was only 16 at the time. Prominent fashion houses such as Yves Saint Laurent signed Kurková to contracts, while print campaigns for Chanel, Tommy Hilfiger, Max Mara, Bottega Veneta, Donna Karan, Celine, Fendi, Elie Saab, rag & bone, Jean Paul Gaultier, Roberto Cavalli, Valentino, Louis Vuitton, John Galliano, Mango, Christian Dior, Hugo Boss, Versace, H&M, and others helped expose her even more. In the 2002 Victoria's Secret Fashion Show, she wore the "Star of Victoria" Fantasy Bra. Other runway credits of hers include Alberta Ferretti, Alexander McQueen, Balenciaga, Calvin Klein, Carolina Herrera, Chanel, Christian Dior, Dolce & Gabbana, Givenchy, Gucci, Karl Lagerfeld, Louis Vuitton, Marc Jacobs, Prada, Ralph Lauren, Stella McCartney, Versace, and Vera Wang.

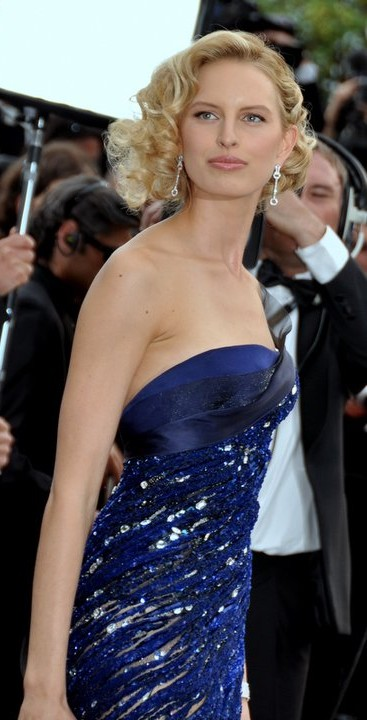
Kurková at the 64th Cannes Film Festival in 2011

Kurková notably tripped on her long gown and fell down as she was leading the finale of the Atelier Versace Fall/Winter 2002 fashion show. However, it didn't hinder her career and she was named "Model of the Year" at the 2002 VH1/Vogue Fashion Awards, in part for her work ethic, having worked 23 weeks straight. Photographed by Steven Meisel, she was presented on the September 2004 cover of American Vogue as one of the "Models of the Moment".

Kurková has appeared on over 51 Vogue magazine covers internationally, including the French, Italian, UK, German, Russian, Greek, and Korean editions, and has also appeared in international editions of Elle, Vanity Fair, and The Face. She has worked with noted fashion photographers like Steven Klein, Mario Sorrenti, and Mario Testino. During the Christian Dior Fall/Winter 2004 Couture show, she was wearing a corseted princess gown that was so vast and outrageously ornate that she got stuck in the fabric and had to be manhandled off the catwalk.

After being contracted as a Victoria's Secret Angel in 2005, she was featured in the 2006 Victoria's Secret Fashion Show, showcasing the $6.5 million "Hearts On Fire" Fantasy Bra decked with almost 2,000 diamonds weighing 800 carats (160 g) with a centerpiece diamond brooch weighing 10 carats (2.0 g). During this same Victoria's Secret show, she opened the "Come Fly With Me" segment, dressed as a fantasized sexy air hostess. Due to a design flaw, her right shoe flapped opened and slipped off her foot half way down the catwalk, causing Kurková to continue walking with only one shoe on as nothing had happened. The video got more than 600,000 views, and the incident was soon considered a "legendary moment".

As an Angel, she received a star on the Hollywood "Walk of Fame" prior to the 2007 Victoria's Secret Fashion Show, appeared on the February 2008 cover of Esquire, re-creating the classic 1966 Angie Dickinson cover for the magazine's 75th anniversary, and was chosen as part of People magazine's 100 most beautiful people in the world. In December 2007, she was featured in print ads for Dell.

Kurková has a smooth indentation in place of a navel due to surgery she had as an infant, and photographs are often altered by the addition of an image of a belly button to hide this.

In November 2008, E! Entertainment Television voted her the world's sexiest woman, beating Angelina Jolie, Scarlett Johansson, and fellow Angels Gisele Bündchen, Heidi Klum and Adriana Lima. Kurková modeled for Bottega Veneta spring 2011 campaign in a classic Hitchcock style.

On 24 January 2011, Kurková was one of the most talked-about models of the grand show organized by the French lingerie brand Etam Groupe in the style of the Victoria's Secret shows. She notably opened the show in an underskirt holding a real living lamb. Later on in the show, she returned to the catwalk wearing a billowing black kimono complete with a five-meter train. When she was entering the catwalk, the garment's train slipped off the catwalk and got stuck under it, forcing Kurková to remove her whole cloak, to the audience's applause. The incident was widely reported in the media, to the point that the brand Etam published a video of it on their official YouTube channel.

In September 2018, Kurková became the first cover model of Vogue Czechoslovakia. The first released cover featured her from behind with a back tattoo that has a strong symbolic meaning to the history of the two countries in celebration of the 100th anniversary of the establishment of former Czechoslovakia.

=== Acting ===
Kurková made her film debut alongside Frankie Muniz, Harvey Keitel, and Amber Valletta in Howard Himelstein's 2007 coming-of-age dramedy, My Sexiest Year. She played Courtney A. Kreiger / Cover Girl in the live action 2009 G.I. Joe: The Rise of Cobra film. She was a guest judge on the fifteenth season of America's Next Top Model and fourth season of Germany's Next Top Model.

She appeared on the 2008 Academy of Country Music Awards along with Dwight Yoakam in presenting the "Top Female Vocalist" award to Carrie Underwood. In September 2010, Kurková guest-starred on NBC's Chuck season 4 episode, "Chuck Versus the Suitcase". She played "Sofia Stepanova", an enemy spy posing as a supermodel.

Kurková appeared alongside German model Eva Padberg on the reality television show Das perfekte Model, a model casting-show similar to Germany's Next Top Model. The show aired in spring 2012 on German television broadcast VOX. The show was canceled in summer 2012 due to low ratings. Kurková made a guest appearance on television series 30 Rock in Season 6, Episode 9 titled "Leap Day" in February 2012.

Kurková appeared as herself in an episode of Person of Interest, in a subplot where the character of Detective Fusco (Kevin Chapman) protects Kurková from Armenian gangsters. The subplot, which is interspersed throughout the episode, takes up less than two minutes of screen time and is played for comic relief. Kurková was also a supermodel coach on OXYGEN'S "The Face", alongside Naomi Campbell, Heidi Klum and Coco Rocha.

In 2026, Kurková appeared in a cameo role as herself in The Devil Wears Prada 2.

=== Other ventures ===
According to ABC News, she cooperates with pediatricians and healthcare providers to found Gryph and IvyRose, a herbal care product line for children.

== Personal life ==
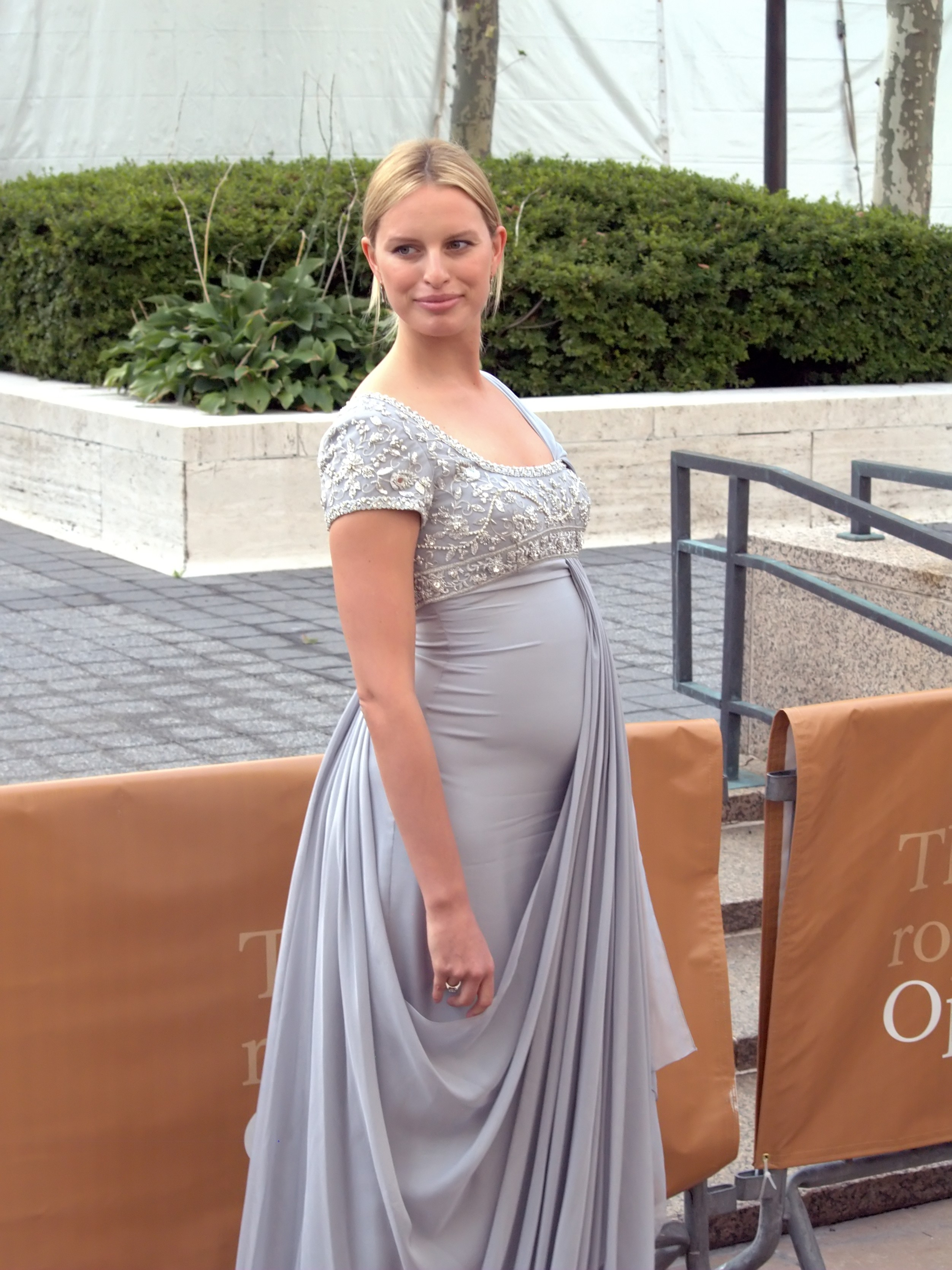
Kurková at the 2009 premiere of the Metropolitan Opera in New York City

Kurková used to live in New York City's TriBeCa district and enjoyed courtside basketball games at Madison Square Garden.

On 8 January 2009, FoxNews.com reported that Kurková suffered from hypothyroidism, which led to her unusual heavier physique and caused Kurková to be panned by fashion critics, when she walked the runway for Cía Marítima and Victoria's Secret in June 2008 and November 2008, respectively. In February 2012 at the Council of Fashion Designers of America forum on "A Well Balanced Life", Kurková spoke about her thyroid problems:

I thought I was going crazy. I was having panic attacks every minute and I didn't know what was happening, because I've been a healthy person. I've exercised all my life. I've always eaten well and taken care of myself.

Kurková also said she developed symptoms of premature menopause and gained 30 pounds (14 kg). Robert McConnell, a thyroid specialist, pointed out that Kurková's case includes a spate of symptoms which "totality doesn't fit into one, neat little package".

In July 2009, she announced she was expecting her first child with her fiancé, Archie Drury. Kurková revealed that Drury had proposed to her while on holiday in Cape Town, South Africa, and they were married before the birth of their son, Tobin Jack Drury, which occurred on 29 October 2009. On 5 November 2015, Kurková gave birth to their second son, Noah Lee Drury. On 27 April 2021, Kurková gave birth to their daughter, Luna Grace Drury.

Kurková has American citizenship and, as of 2020, had settled in Miami, Florida.

== Charity ==
In March 2006, Kurková received an award from the non-profit organization "Women Together" for her humanitarian work. Kurková was honored for working for the welfare of children through organizations such as "the Beautiful Life Fund", "Free Arts", and "Global Youth Action Network". Kurková received the Atmosphere Magazine Award at the Madrid Planet Hollywood Mexican restaurant on 18 December 2003.

== Awards ==
Kurková was named one of the world's "50 Most Beautiful People" by People magazine in 2004, and remains the youngest model ever to win "Model of the Year" at the VH1/Vogue Fashion Awards. She received a star on the Hollywood Walk of Fame in 2007.

Kurková was listed by Forbes as one of the top-earning supermodels in the world. In 2012, she was honored as "Style Icon" at the Vienna Awards for Fashion and Lifestyle.

She also received the GALA Spa Award in the category of "Beauty Idol", which was awarded by one of Germany's people magazines. In early 2013, Kurková released her own fragrance in cooperation with LR Health & Beauty Systems, an international operation company. The fragrance cooperation already earned Kurková a nomination at the 2013 Duftstar Awards in the category "Novelties – Lifestyle (Women)".
