= List of Elle Brasil cover models =

This list of Elle Brasil cover models (1988–2018; 2020–present) is a catalog of cover models who have appeared on the cover of Elle Brasil, the Brazilian edition of French lifestyle magazine Elle.

== 1980s ==
=== 1988 ===
Issue	Cover model	Photographer
May	Julie Kowarick	J. R. Duran
June	Karen Bertrand	Luíz Garrido
July	Claudia Ferrabraz	
August	Renée Simonsen	Gilles Bensimon
September	Stina Sandgren	Steven Silverstein
October		
November		
December		

=== 1989 ===
Issue	Cover model	Photographer
January		
February		
March		
April	Serena Ruspoli, Karen Mulder	Oliviero Toscani
May	Sandra Rodriguez	Marc Hispard
June		
July		
August	Linda Evangelista	
September		
October	Monica Bellucci	
November	Claudia Schiffer	
December		

== 1990s ==
=== 1990 ===
Issue	Cover model	Photographer
January	Cindy Crawford	
February	Rhonda Niles	
March	Ana Ramberg, Lori Godet, & Sandra Rodrigues	
April		
May		
June		
July	Linda Evangelista	Gilles Bensimon
August		
September		
October		
November	Claudia Schiffer	
December		

=== 1991 ===
Issue	Cover model	Photographer
January		
February		
March	Beri Smitter	Pamela Hanson
April		
May		
June		
July		
August		
September		
October		
November		
December		

=== 1992 ===
Issue	Cover model	Photographer
January		
February		
March	Valéria Monteiro	Isabel Garcia
April		
May	Linda Evangelista	Paulo Vainer
June	Jens Peters, uncredited model	
July	Michaela Bercu, Lisa Butcher, Debbie Smallback, Kim Melander	Gilles Bensimon
August		
September		
October		
November		
December		

=== 1993 ===
Issue	Cover model	Photographer
January		
February		
March	Cindy Crawford	Gilles Bensimon
April		
May	Claudia Schiffer	Gilles Bensimon
June	Kate Moss	
July	Luciana Curtis	Nana Moraes
August		Pedro Martinelli
September	Christy Turlington	
October		
November		
December		

=== 1994 ===
Issue	Cover model	Photographer
January		
February	Geórgia Wortmann	
March		
April	Cassia Lara	
May		
June	Carolina Fagundes	
July		
August		
September		
October	Cindy Schiliró	
November		
December		

=== 1995 ===
Issue	Cover model	Photographer
January	Cindy Schiliró	
February	Luciana Curtis	João Ávila
March		
April		
May	Priscila Barp	Gui Paganine
June	Cassia Lara	
July		
August		
September		
October		
November		
December	Camila Espinoza	

=== 1996 ===
Issue	Cover model	Photographer
January		
February		
March		
April	Cassia Avila	
May	Carolina Fagundes	
June		
July		
August	Kate Moss	
September		
October		
November		
December		

=== 1997 ===
Issue	Cover model	Photographer
January	Priscila Barp	
February		
March		
April	Cláudia Abreu	
May	Leticia Spiller	
June		
July	Ana Paula Arósio	Jairo Goldfluis
August		
September		
October		
November	Luana Piovani	
December		

=== 1998 ===
Issue	Cover model	Photographer
January	Laetitia Casta	
February		
March		
April	Gisele Bündchen	J. R. Duran
May	Renata Maciel	J. R. Duran
June		
July		
August		
September		
October	Gisele Bündchen	
November		
December	Laetitia Casta	

=== 1999 ===
Issue	Cover model	Photographer
January		
February		
March		
April	Leticia Spiller	
May		
June	Gisele Bündchen	
July	Ana Paula Arósio	Jairo Goldfluis
August	Raí	
September	Deborah Secco	
October	Adriane Galisteu	
November		
December		

== 2000s ==
=== 2000 ===
Issue	Cover model	Photographer
January		
February		
March	Gisele Bündchen	
April	Camila Pitanga	
May	Ana Paula Arósio	Jairo Goldfluis
June	Paulo Zulu & Cassiana Mallmann	
July	Gisele Bündchen	
August		
September	Joana Prado	
October	Fernanda Lima	
November		
December		

=== 2001 ===
Issue	Cover model	Photographer
January	Patrícia Pillar	
February		
March	Madonna	
April		
May		
June	Luciana Curtis	Henrique Gendre
July	Rafaela Fischer	
August	Nicole Kidman	
September	Cláudia Raia	
October	Angélica	
November	Jennifer Aniston	
December	Caroline Ribeiro	

=== 2002 ===
Issue	Cover model	Photographer
January	Liv Tyler	
February	Julia Roberts	
March	Gwyneth Paltrow	
April	Penélope Cruz	
May	Uma Thurman	
June	Cameron Diaz	
July	Jennifer Lopez	
August	Ana Hickmann	
September	Gisele Bündchen	
October	Fernanda Tavares	
November	Adriana Lima	
December	Fernanda Lima	

=== 2003 ===
Issue	Cover model	Photographer
January	Gisele Bündchen	
February	Nicole Kidman	
March	Shakira	
April	Lavínia Vlasak	
May		
June	Luana Piovani	J. R. Duran
July	Camila Pitanga	
August		
September		
October		
November		
December		

=== 2004 ===
Issue	Cover model	Photographer
January		
February		
March		
April		
May		
June		
July	Carolina Dieckmann	
August		
September		
October		
November		
December		

=== 2005 ===
Issue	Cover model	Photographer
January		
February		
March		
April		
May	Gisele Bündchen	
June		
July		
August		
September		
October		
November		
December		

=== 2006 ===
Issue	Cover model	Photographer
January		
February		
March		
April		
May		
June		
July		
August		
September		
October		
November		
December		

=== 2007 ===
Issue	Cover model	Photographer
January		
February		
March		
April	Flávia de Oliveira	
May		
June		
July		
August		
September		
October		
November		
December		

=== 2008 ===
Issue	Cover model	Photographer
January		
February		
March		
April	Viviane Orth	
May		
June	Madonna	
July		
August		
September		
October		
November		
December		

=== 2009 ===
Issue	Cover model	Photographer
January		
February	Gisele Bündchen	
March		
April	Raquel Zimmermann	
May		
June		
July		
August		
September		
October		
November		
December		

== 2010s ==
=== 2010 ===
Issue	Cover model	Photographer
January	Gabriella Girardi	Fabio Bartelt
February	Caroline Trentini	Fabio Bartelt
March	Aline Weber	Fabio Bartelt
April	Barbara Berger	Fabio Bartelt
May	Lovani Pinnow	Fabio Bartelt
June	Viviane Orth	Fabio Bartelt
July	Gisele Bündchen	Gui Paganini
August	Luana Teifke	Gui Paganini
September	Bruna Tenório	Gui Paganini
October	Aline Weber	Gui Paganini
November	Caroline Trentini	Gui Paganini
December	Ana Beatriz Barros	Gui Paganini

=== 2011 ===
Issue	Cover model	Photographer
January	Viviane Orth	Gui Paganini
February	Fabiana Mayer	Gui Paganini
March	Isabeli Fontana	Gui Paganini
April	Barbara Berger	Gui Paganini
May	Gisele Bündchen	Nino Muñoz
June	Thairine Garcia	Fabio Bartelt
July	Caroline Trentini	Bob Wolfenson
August	Raquel Zimmermann	Henrique Gendre
September	Ana Beatriz Barros	Fabio Bartelt
September	Isabeli Fontana; Izabel Goulart	Gui Paganini
September	Renata Kuerten	Paulo Vainer
October	Valentina Zelyaeva	Bob Wolfenson
November	Daria Werbowy	Terry Richardson
December	Lea T	Fabio Bartelt

=== 2012 ===
Issue	Cover model	Photographer
January	Bruna Tenório	Dudu & Mendez
February	Patricia van der Vliet	Dudu & Mendez
March	Aline Weber	Gui Paganini
April	Georgia May Jagger	Jacques Dequeker
May	Coco Rocha	Max Abadian
June	Ana Beatriz Barros	Gui Paganini
July	Carolina Thaler; Nadine Ponce; Nathalia Oliveira	Gui Paganini
August	Alicia Kuczman	Gui Paganini
September	Candice Swanepoel	Eduardo Rezende
October	Izabel Goulart	Eduardo Rezende
November	Bérénice Marlohe	Max Abadian
December	Thairine Garcia	Bob Wolfenson

=== 2013 ===
Issue	Cover model	Photographer
January	Ana Cláudia Michels	Eduardo Rezende
February	Aline Weber	Bob Wolfenson
March	Bruna Tenório	Gui Paganini
April	Lily Aldridge	Eduardo Rezende
May	Helena Christensen	Karl Lagerfeld
June	Enikő Mihalik	Gui Paganini
July	Elena Melnik	Nicole Heiniger
August	Georgia May Jagger	Max Abadian
September	Aline Weber	Eduardo Rezende
October	Daniela Braga	Fabio Bartelt
November	Marcelia Freesz	Bob Wolfenson
December	Enikő Mihalik	Bruno Ripoche

=== 2014 ===
Issue	Cover model	Photographer
January	Josephine Skriver	Nicole Heiniger
February	Magdalena Jasek; Camille Rowe; Ysaunny Brito	Nicole Heiniger
March	Shirley Mallmann	Gui Paganini
April	Lindsay Ellingson	Nicole Heiniger
May	Pedro Lourenço; Alexandre Herchcovitch; Glória Coelho; Reinaldo Lourenço; Oskar Metsavaht; Lais Ribeiro; Cris Barros; Victorino Campos; Lenny Niemeyer; Eduardo Pombal; Adriana Bozon; Paula Raia	Bob Wolfenson
June	Beyoncé	Patrick Demarchelier
July	Gisele Bündchen	Matt Jones
August	Clara Alonso	Nicole Heiniger
September	Isabeli Fontana	Fabio Bartelt
October	Lais Ribeiro	Eduardo Rezende
November	Gisele Bündchen	Nino Muñoz
December	Alexa Chung	Nicole Heiniger

=== 2015 ===
Issue	Cover model	Photographer
January	Barbara Palvin	Gui Paganini
February	Isabeli Fontana	Gui Paganini
March	Ana Beatriz Barros; Bruna Tenório; Luma Grothe	Bob Wolfenson
April	Devon Windsor	Nicole Heiniger
May	Caroline Ribeiro	Fabio Bartelt
June		
July	Thairine Garcia	Nicole Heiniger
August	Crystal Renn	Alexander Neumann
September	Lais Ribeiro	Gustavo Zylbersztajn
October	Aline Weber	Gustavo Zylbersztajn
November	Caroline Ribeiro	Nicole Heiniger
December	Gizele Oliveira; Laureen Fonseca; Mahany Pery; Waleska Gorczevski	Nicole Heiniger

=== 2016 ===
Issue	Cover model	Photographer
January	Barbara Fialho	Gustavo Zylbersztajn
February	Bella Hadid	Max Abadian
March	Karlie Kloss	Nicole Heiniger
April	Hannah Ferguson	Gustavo Zylbersztajn
May	Alek Wek	Gustavo Zylbersztajn
June	Amanda Wellsh	Nicole Heiniger
July	Miranda Kerr	Nino Muñoz
August	Stella Maxwell	Max Abadian
September	Rosie Huntington-Whiteley	David Bellemere
October	Jourdan Dunn	Mark Abrahams
November	Valentina Sampaio	Gui Paganini
December	Aline Weber	Gui Paganini
December	Marcelia Freesz; Sofie	Bob Wolfenson

=== 2017 ===
Issue	Cover model	Photographer
January	Ari Westphal	Josefina Bietti
February	Hari Nef	Mariana Maltoni
March	Hanne Gaby Odiele	Mark Abrahams
April	Eduarda Bretas	Nicole Heiniger
May	Leila Zandonai; Liza Silva; Brenda Pivatto; Bruna Dapper; Sarah Berger; Barbara Valente	Mariana Maltoni
May	Susanne Knipper; Julia Fleming	Will Vendramini
May	Thairine Garcia	Cecilia Duarte
June	Hailey Baldwin; Maria Borges	Mariana Maltoni
July	Valentina Sampaio	Nicole Heiniger
August	Daphne Groeneveld	Mark Abrahams
September	Alicia Keys	Zoltan Tombor
October	Fernanda Oliveira; Linda Helena	Cecilia Duarte
November	Candice Huffine	Yulia Gorbachenko
December	Caetano Veloso	Bob Wolfenson
December	Lázaro Ramos; Taís Araújo	Gustavo Zylbersztajn
December	Lea T	Mariana Maltoni
December	Sônia Braga	Paulo Vainer
December	Zé Celso	Marcio Simnch

=== 2018 ===
Issue	Cover model	Photographer
January	Nayara Oliveira	Nicole Heiniger
February	Angelica Erthal; Daniela Braga; Johnny Luxo; Lorena Maraschi	Paulo Vainer
March	Liya Kebede	Pamela Hanson
April	Isis Bataglia	Eber Figueira
May	Isabeli Fontana	Bob Wolfenson; Hick Duarte; Nicole Heiniger
June	Amanda Wellsh	Will Vendramini
July	Lauren Hutton	Henrique Gendre
August	Cris Lopes	Gleeson Paulino
August	Gabriela Lourenço	Paulo Vainer
August	Yasmin Morais	Josefina Bietti

== 2020s ==
=== 2020 ===
Issue	Cover model	Photographer
September	Gilberto Gil	
September	Iza	
September	Katú Mirim	
September	Djamila Ribeiro	
December	Jamily Wernke Meurer	Gleeson Paulino
December	Jhon Oliveira; Monique Lemos	
December	Yoko Ono; John Lennon	
December	Patti Smith	

=== 2021 ===
Issue	Cover model	Photographer
March	Anitta	
March	Taís Araújo	
March	Maria Bethânia	
March	Mano Brown	
March	Caroline Trentini	
May	Bruna Marquezine	
September	Shirley Mallmann	Josefina Bietti
September	Michaela Jaé Rodriguez	
September	Caetano Veloso	
September	Pabllo Vittar	
December	Samile Bermannelli	
December	Lia de Itamaracá	
December	Milton Nascimento	
December	Wagner Moura	

=== 2022 ===
Issue	Cover model	Photographer
March	Sasha Meneghel	
March	Xuxa	
May	Adriana Lima	Josefina Bietti
September	Viola Davis	Mar + Vin
December	Sabrina Sato	
December	Lauren Wasser	

=== 2023 ===
Issue	Cover model	Photographer
March	Marina Ruy Barbosa	
May	Anitta	
May	Erykah Badu	Mar + Vin
September	Precious Lee	
December	Fina Cadjancu; Jackson Tavares	Mar + Vin
December	Matheus De Moraes	Mar + Vin
December	Mahany Pery	Mar + Vin
December	Raika; Luiz Claudio; Nadson Kaique; Jackson Tavares; Matheus De Moraes; Victor de Matos Leal; Caique dos Santos; Renan Lima Luiz	Mar + Vin
December	Thairine Garcia	Lufré

=== 2024 ===
Issue	Cover model	Photographer
March	Maria Bethânia; Caetano Veloso	
March	Preta Gil	
March	Camila Queiroz	
March	Ísis Valverde	
May	Caroline Trentini; Samile Bermannelli; Isabeli Fontana; Barbara Valente; Valentina Sampaio; Luciana Curtis; Sheila Bawar; Shirley Mallmann; Caroline Ribeiro; Ana Cláudia Michels; Fernanda Tavares	Nicole Heiniger
September	Fernanda Montenegro	
December	Larissa Moraes	
December	Luíza Perote	Mar + Vin
December	Lara Spoth	

=== 2025 ===
Issue	Cover model	Photographer
March	Gilberto Gil	Mar + Vin
March	Erika Hilton	Mar + Vin
May	Tilda Swinton	Mar + Vin
September	Dakota Johnson	Gleeson Paulino
December	Djavan	
December	Isabeli Fontana	Gleeson Paulino
December	Mahany Pery	Mar + Vin

=== 2026 ===
Issue	Cover model	Photographer
March	Samile Bermannelli	
March	Tânia Maria	
March	Mikaela Gomes da Mot	
May	Stephanie Cavalli	Nicole Heiniger
May	Mariane Calazan	
May	Olivia Dean	

== See also ==
- List of Harper's Bazaar Brasil cover models
- List of Vogue Brasil cover models
