= List of Harper's Bazaar Brasil cover models =

This list of Harper's Bazaar Brasil cover models (2011–present) is a catalog of cover models who have appeared on the cover of Harper's Bazaar Brasil , the Brazilian edition of American fashion magazine Harper's Bazaar.

== 2010s ==
=== 2011 ===
Issue	Cover model	Photographer
November	Gisele Bündchen	Terry Richardson
December	Caroline Trentini	Gui Paganini

=== 2012 ===
Issue	Cover model	Photographer
January	Thairine Garcia	Gui Paganini
February	Ana Beatriz Barros	Fabio Bartelt
March	Lily Donaldson	Terry Richardson
April	Ana Cláudia Michels	Gui Paganini
May	Thairine Garcia	Gui Paganini
June	Tatiana Cotliar	Fabio Bartelt
July	Aline Weber	Gui Paganini
August	Katia Selinger	Paulo Vainer
September	Coco Rocha	Fe Pinheiro
October	Alicia Kuczman	Gui Paganini
November	Gisele Bündchen	Terry Richardson
December	Anne Vyalitsyna	Paulo Vainer

=== 2013 ===
Issue	Cover model	Photographer
January	Lais Ribeiro	Bob Wolfenson
February	Cindy Crawford	Nagi Sakai
March	Joan Smalls	Kacper Kasprzyk
April	Daniela Braga	Gui Paganini
May	Kate Upton	Sebastian Faena
June	Alessandra Ambrosio	Terry Richardson
July	Thairine Garcia	Gui Paganini
August	Caroline Trentini	Fabio Bartelt
September	Dakota Fanning	Karl Lagerfeld
October	Thairine Garcia	Gui Paganini
November	Crystal Renn	Dusan Reljin
December	Diane Kruger	Fabio Bartelt

=== 2014 ===
Issue	Cover model	Photographer
January	Daniela Braga	Bob Wolfenson
February	Adriana Lima	Nico Bustos
March	Thairine Garcia	Nicole Heiniger
April	Fernanda Lima	Fabio Bartelt
May	Laura Love	Thanassis Krikis
June	Isabeli Fontana	Fabio Bartelt
July	Ymre Stiekema	Fabio Bartelt
August	Luma Grothe & Cauã Reymond	Nicole Heiniger
September	Claudia Schiffer	Sebastian Faena
October	Ana Beatriz Barros	Fabio Bartelt
November	Izabel Goulart	Nicole Heiniger
December	Sonya Gorelova	Nicole Heiniger

=== 2015 ===
Issue	Cover model	Photographer
January	Barbara Fialho	Fabio Bartelt
February	Elisabeth Erm	Thanassis Krikis
March	Daniela Braga	Nicole Heiniger
April	Toni Garrn	David Roemer
May	Kate King	Fabio Bartelt
June	Enikő Mihalik	David Roemer
July	Luma Grothe	Fabio Bartelt
August	Isis Bataglia	Nicole Heiniger
September	Katy Perry	Jean-Paul Goude
October	Thairine Garcia	Oskar Metsavaht
November	Sabina Lobova	Paolo Zerbini
December	Bianca Brandolini	Fabio Bartelt

=== 2016 ===
Issue	Cover model	Photographer
January	Daniela Braga	Henrique Schiefferdecker
February	Amanda Wellsh	Nicole Heiniger
March	Cameron Traiber	Rafael Pavarotti
April	Isis Bataglia	Gui Paganini
May	Abby Williamson & Peyton Knight	Mariana Maltoni
June	Joséphine Le Tutour	Gui Paganini
July/August	Aline Weber	Paul Wegman
September	Kanye West & Kim Kardashian	Karl Lagerfeld
October	Kris Gottschalk	Ace Amir
November	Samile Bermannelli	Ace Amir
December/January	Camila Simões	Rafael Pavarotti

=== 2017 ===
Issue	Cover model	Photographer
February	Jordan Moon	Ace Amir
March	Regan Laird	Stefania Paparelli
April	Laura Neiva	Karine Basílio
May	Aira Ferreira	Rafael Pavarotti
June/July	Lala Rudge	Ace Amir
August	Fernanda Beuker	Stefania Paparelli
September	Karlie Kloss & Natasha Poly	Brigitte Lacombe
October	Samile Bermannelli	Gilad Sasporta
November	Roza Figueira	Ace Amir
December/January	Marina Ruy Barbosa	Paulo Vainer & Stefania Paparelli

=== 2018 ===
Issue	Cover model	Photographer
February	Ella Hope Merryweather	Zelinda Zanichelli
March	Alana Felisberto	Ace Amir
April	Barbara Valente	Stéphanie Volpato
May	Eduarda Bretas	Gilad Sasporta
June/July	Bruna Marquezine	Brian Haider
August	Anna Avila	Ace Amir
September	Paris Jackson	Mario Sorrenti
October	Larissa Saldanha	Jacob + Carrol
November	Linda Helena	Oskar Metsavaht
December/January	Amanda Martins	Karel Losenicky

=== 2019 ===
Issue	Cover model	Photographer
February	Deborah Secco	Bob Wolfenson
March	Isabelle Drummond	Fabio Bartelt
April	Ana Flavia	Gilad Sasporta
April	Iza	
May	Brenda Larigaudie	Bob Wolfenson
June/July	Taís Araújo	Bob Wolfenson
August	Paolla Oliveira	Ivan Erick Menezes
September	Celine Dion	Mario Sorrenti
October	Jadi Wegener	Ricardo Rivera
November		
December/January		

== 2020s ==
=== 2020 ===
Issue	Cover model	Photographer
February		
March	Mariana Ximenes	
April		
May	Xuxa	
June/July		
August	Flávia Lucini	
September		
October		
November		
December		

=== 2021 ===
Issue	Cover model	Photographer
January	Jamily Meurer	
February		
March	Lala Rudge	
April	Mariana Santana	
May	Anita Pozzo	
June	Gabriela Prioli	
July	Ana Barbosa	
August	Rebecca Dayan	
August	Chiara Ferragni	
September	Beyoncé	
October		
November		
December/January		

=== 2022 ===
Issue	Cover model	Photographer
February		
March		
April	Carolina Burgin	
May	Cris Barros	
June		
July	Taís Araújo	
July	Joy Costa	
August		
September		
October		
November		
December	Lelê Saddi	

=== 2023 ===
Issue	Cover model	Photographer
February		
March		
April	Any Gabrielly	
April	Xuxa	
May		
June		
July		
August		
September	Iza	
October		
November		
December/January 2024	Luciana Tranchesi	

=== 2024 ===
Issue	Cover model	Photographer
February	Anitta	
March	Samile Bermannelli	Cassia Tabatini
April	Sheila Bawar	Gilad Sasporta
April	Elisa Zarzur	Nicole Faldini
May	Monica Bellucci	Fe Pinheirø
June	Maria Braz	Nicole Fialdini
June	Luíza Perote	Lufré
July	Rayssa Leal	Vava Ribeiro
July	Barbara Valente	Pedro Napolinario
August	Marina Ruy Barbosa	Fernando Tomaz
August	Marina Ruy Barbosa	Gabriela Schmidt
September	Naomi Campbell	Malick Bodian
September	Bella Campos	Stéphanie Volpato
September	Barbara Palvin	Késsia Riany
October	Monica Martelli	Juliana Rocha
October	Sasha Meneghel	Nicole Faldini
October	Antonela Roccuzzo	Famke Van Hagen
November	Gabz	Marina Zabenzi
November	Janaye	Manuel Obadia-Wills
November	Chiara Scelsi	Massimiliano Gallus
November	Lindsey Wixson	Karel Losenicky
December/January 2025	Lavína de Aquino	Josefina Bietti
December/January 2025	Amira Pinheiro	Jorge Ewald
December/January 2025	Mariana Santana	Guilherme Nabhan

=== 2025 ===
Issue	Cover model	Photographer
February	Camila Queiroz	Josefina Bietti
March	Rihanna	Luis Alberto Rodriguez
March	Lais Oliveira	Ivan Erick Menezes
April	Shirley Mallmann	Hick Duarte
May	Fernanda Lima	Juliana Rocha
May	Fernanda Tavares, Barbara di Creddo, Caroline Ribeiro, Emanuela de Paula, Alessandra Berriel, Lais Ribeiro	Paulo Vainer
June	Paolla Oliveira	Ivan Erick Menezes
June	Ana Elisa Brito	Gildad Sasporta
June	Carol Monteiro	Lufré
June	Dulce María	Guilherme Nabhan
July/August	Eliza Douglas	Manuel Obadia-Wills
July/August	Elisa Zarzur	Cassia Tabatini
July/August	Helena Bordon	Jorge Ewald
July/August	Zezé Motta	Ivan Erick Menezes
September	Caroline Trentini	Lufré
September	Daria Rodionova	Petros Kouiouris
September	Élise Crombez	Marco Cella
September	Allexia de Jesus	Jonathan Zamora
October	Ingrid Guimarães	Bruna Castanhiera
October	Silvia Braz	Ivan Erick Menezes
October	Livia Nunes	
October	Mariana Ximenes	
November	Camila Pitanga	
November	Luciana Curtis	
November	Iza Dantas	
December/January 2026	Gabriela Nied	
December/January 2026	Mariana Santana	
December/January 2026	Daiane Sodre	
December/January 2026	Lara Menezes	

=== 2026 ===
Issue	Cover model	Photographer
February	Laiza De Moura	Ángel Castellanos
February	Marina Sena	Juliana Rocha
March	Alice Braga	Mariana Maltoni
March	Fernanda Tavares	Gui Paganini
April	Caroline Ribeiro	Ivan Erick
May	Alessandra Ambrosio, Anja Ambrosio Mazur	Fernando Tomaz
May	Carliane Paixão	Marco Cella
June	Isabeli Fontana	Cecilia Duarte
July	Ana Clara Falconi	Josefina Bietti
July	Manoela Schwarz	Henrique Gendre
August	Ana Beatriz Barros	Lufré
August	Luísa Matsushita (Lovefoxxx)	Guilherme Nabhan
August	Raynara Negrine	Emmanuel Giraud
September	Kaia Andrade, Erika Barletta, Sabryna Oliveira, Laís Garcia	Lufré
September	Victoria Blecher	Lufré
September	Luíza Perote	Lufré
October	Gabby Dobbins	Lufré
October	Karoline Niek	Bob Wolfenson

== See also ==
- List of Vogue Brasil cover models
