= List of Vogue Brasil cover models =

This list of Vogue Brasil cover models (1975–present) is a catalog of cover models who have appeared on the cover of Vogue Brasil, the Brazilian edition of American fashion magazine Vogue.

== 1970s ==
=== 1975 ===
Issue	Cover model	Photographer
May	Betsy Monteiro de Carvalho	Otto Stupakoff
June	Rene Russo	David Bailey
July/August	Ana Maria de Moraes Barros	Otto Stupakoff
September	Lauren Hutton	Francesco Scavullo
October	Rene Russo	Francesco Scavullo
November	Cher	Richard Avedon
December	Lisa Taylor	Francesco Scavullo

=== 1976 ===
Issue	Cover model	Photographer
January	Virginia Loureiro	Flávio Amorim
February		
March		
April	Lívia Mund	Flávio Amorim
May	Gisela Amaral	Flavio Amorim
June	Beverly Johnson	
July		
August	Estela Sepreny	
September		
October	Margaux Hemingway	
November	Maria Lamarca	Antonio Guerreiro
December		

=== 1977 ===
Issue	Cover model	Photographer
January		
February	Vittoria Amati	Miro de Souza
March	Luisa Bretti	
April	Shirley Corrigan	Miro de Souza
May	Ilde Lacerda Soares	Miro de Souza
June	Lúcia Cúria	Zaragoza
July	Jacqueline Bisset	Chris Von Wangenhelm
August		
September	Sâmia Maluf	Miro de Souza
October	Antônia Frering	
November	Bruna Lombardi	
December/January 1978	Bronie Lozneanu	Miro de Souza

=== 1978 ===
Issue	Cover model	Photographer
February	Martha Rocha	Antonio Guerreiro
March	Dalma Callado	
April	Bia Ferreira da Rosa	Luiz Tripolli
May	Antônia Frering	
June	Sônia Braga	
July		
August	Patricia Borges da Fonseca	Luiz Tripolli
September	Marcia Taylor	Miro de Souza
October	Bronie Lozneanu	Miro de Souza
November	Jacqueline Bisset	Richard Avedon
December	Dane Nelson	Michael Thompson

=== 1979 ===
Issue	Cover model	Photographer
January	Tânia Caldas	Luiz Tripolli
February	Yara Chaves	Luiz Tripolli
March	Maria Regina Falcão	Otto Stupakoff
April	Pilar Crespi	Chico Aragão
May	Lou Borelli	Luiz Tripolli
June	Patricia Borges da Fonseca	
July	Renata Scarpa	
August	Patti Hansen	Francesco Scavullo
September	Debora Franco	
October	Laura Wheeler	
November	Marjorie Andrade	
December	Bebel Marcondes Ferraz	

== 1980s ==
=== 1980 ===
Issue	Cover model	Photographer
January	Esmé Marshall	Stan Shaffer
February (#56)	Jorge Amado	
March	Silvia Martins	Luiz Tripolli
April	Rossella Gadaleta	Paulo Rocha
May	Viviane Vasconcelos	Luiz Tripolli
June	Andrea Dellal	
July	Maria Cecilia Street	
August	Vera Harfield	
September		
October	Camila Moraes Barros	Chico Aragão
November	Jerry Hall	Paulo Rocha
December	Antônia Frering	J.R. Duran

=== 1981 ===
Issue	Cover model	Photographer
January	Cynthia Pereira Lira	
February	Tônia Carrero	Miro de Souza
March	Flávia Carraro	
April	Charlene Shorto	
May	Martha Jussara	J.R. Duran
June	Fatima Muniz Freire	Thomas Susemihl
July	Lica Diniz	J.R. Duran
August	Cristiane Neves da Rocha	
September	Dalma Callado	Paulo Rocha
October	Beatriz Salomón	
November	Amélia Maria Meggiolaro	Miro de Souza
December	Bianca Byington	

=== 1982 ===
Issue	Cover model	Photographer
January	Marlise Eugenie D'Icaray	David Drew Zingg
February	Ivo Pitanguy	
March	Renata Barreto	David Drew Zingg
April	Maria Eugênia Villarta	
May	Xuxa	
June	Sonia Racy	
July	Liliana Carraro de Moraes	David Drew Zingg
August	Patricia Monteiro de Barros	
September	Renata Scarpa Julião	
October	Marjorie Andrade	
November		
December	Maitê Proença	David Drew Zingg

=== 1983 ===
Issue	Cover model	Photographer
January		
February	Jorge Guinle	
March	Luiza Brunet	David Drew Zingg
April	Ana Carolina Assumpção Benhayon	
May	Fernanda Roncato	Luiz Tripolli
June	Dominique Kamber	
July	Renata Scarpa Julião	
August	Luiza Brett	Luiz Tripolli
September	Eleonora Mendes Caldera	Thomas Susemihl
October	Adriana dos Santos Diniz	
November	Cristina de Almeida	Pascal Balland
December	Sílvia Pfeifer	Paulo Sabugosa

=== 1984 ===
Issue	Cover model	Photographer/Artist
January (#102)	Yolanda Penteado	Antônio Gomide (artwork)
February	Paulo Autran	Bob Wolfenson
March	Rachel Cohen	Miro de Souza
April	Ashley Knief	J.R. Duran
May	Luciana Moura de Almeida	J.R. Duran
June	Maria Anna Eugênia do Valle Stockler	J.R. Duran
July	Silvana Bonfiglioli	J.R. Duran
August	Luíza Brunet	J.R. Duran
September	Fabiana Kherlakian	Miro de Souza
October	Tania Loeb	Miro de Souza
November	Julie Kowarick	Luiz Garrido
December	Ana Paula Saraceni Machado	Miro de Souza

=== 1985 ===
Issue	Cover model	Photographer
January	Gisele Poubel Silva	Luiz Garrido
February (#115)	Pietro Maria Bardi	
March	Dominique Kamber	Luiz Garrido
April	Isabela Machline	J.R. Duran
May	Marcia Lima	Luiz Garrido
June	Vivian Cunha	
July	Ana Cristina Ricciardi	Luiz Crispino
August	Marcia Boscardin	Luiz Crispino
September	Carla Padua	Isabel Garcia
October	Marcia Jardim	Luiz Garrido
November	Maria Eugênia	Luiz Garrido
December	Monique Evans	Márcia Ramalho

=== 1986 ===
Issue	Cover model	Photographer
January	Sara Raquel	Isabel Garcia
February (#127)	Fernanda Montenegro	Tim Holt
March	Sônia Braga	Steven Meisel
April	Anne Hopson	Luiz Crispino
May	Denise Piccinni	Luiz Crispino
June	Maria Dias Carvalho	Bob Wolfenson
July	Virginía Punko	Luiz Crispino
August	Marcia Boscardin	Chico Aragão
September	Gisele Zelauy	Fernando Louza
October	Betty Prado	Bob Wolfenson
November	Vanessa Oliveira	Isabel Garcia
December	Vanessa Oliveira	Isabel Garcia

=== 1987 ===
Issue	Cover model	Photographer
January	Julie Kowarick	Bob Wolfenson
February (#139)	Roberto Burle Marx	Burkhard von Harder
March	Sílvia Pfeifer	Luiz Crispino
April	Luíza Brunet	
May	Luciane Quadros	Luix de Oliveira
June	Veronica Verano Daux	Luix de Oliveira
July	Elizabeth Richardson	Morgade
August	Hazel Jean	Fernando Louza
September	Sandra Bodick	Thomas Susemihl
October	Dóris Giesse	Thomas Susemihl
November	Carla Barros	Miro de Souza
December		

=== 1988 ===
Issue	Cover model	Photographer
January		
February (#151)	Caetano Veloso	Willy Biondani
March	Carina Wretnan	Miro de Souza
April	Ana Paula Arósio	Miro de Souza
May	Marjorie César de Andrade	Miro de Souza
June	Virginia Punko	Bob Wolfenson
July	Carol Yun	Miro de Souza
August	Melanie Lualess	Bob Wolfenson
September	Lucy Cunningham	Otto Stupakoff
October	Salina Monti	Otto Stupakoff
November	Emmanuelle Seigner	J.R. Duran
December	Belinda	J.R. Duran

=== 1989 ===
Issue	Cover model	Photographer
January		
February (#163)	Gilberto Braga	
March	Fabianne	Bob Wolfenson
April	Dorothy	
May	Laetitia Firmin-Didot	Carl Bengtsson
June	Marina Kienast	Miro de Souza
July	Marina Kienast	Miro de Souza
August	Robyn Mackintosh	Otto Stupakoff
September	Cristina Khuly	
October	Marjorie Andrade	
November	Charlene Short	Otto Stupakoff
December	Xuxa	Otto Stupakoff

== 1990s ==
=== 1990 ===
Issue	Cover model	Photographer
January		
February		
March		
April		
May	Ruve	J.R. Duran
June		
July (#177)	Hebe Camargo	Miro de Souza
August		
September	Debora Block	Miro de Souza
October		
November	Vera Fischer	Miro de Souza
December	Luíza Brunet	Bob Wolfenson

=== 1991 ===
Issue	Cover model	Photographer
January		
February (#184)	Sônia Braga	Michel Comte
March		
April		
May		
June	Madonna	Steven Meisel
July		
August		
September		
October		
November		
December		

=== 1992 ===
Issue	Cover model	Photographer
January		
February		
March	Cátia Kupssinskii	
April	Valeria Monteiro	Miro de Souza
May	Basia Milewicz	Bob Wolfenson
June		
July		
August	Sharon Stone	Arthur Elgort
September		
October		
November		
December	Luíza Brunet	

=== 1993 ===
Issue	Cover model	Photographer
January		
February		
March		
April		
May		
June		
July		
August		
September	Kate Moss, Unknown, Christy Turlington, Linda Evangelista, Unknown, Unknown, Unknown, Helena Christensen, Veronica Webb, Kristen McMenamy, Unknown, Ève Salvail, Unknown, Unknown, Unknown	
October		
November	Linda Evangelista	Peter Lindbergh
December	Gisele Zelauy	Fabio Toscane

=== 1994 ===
Issue	Cover model	Photographer
January		
February		
March		
April	Jorge Ben Jor	
May	Costanza Pascolato	Clicio
June (#203)	Linda Evangelista	Guy Marineau
July		
August	Isabella Rossellini	Sante D'Orazio
September		
October		
November		
December		

=== 1995 ===
Issue	Cover model	Photographer
January	Cleonice Mercury, Daniela Mercury	J.R. Duran
February		
March (#212)	Antônio Carlos Jobim	Ana Lontra Jobim
April	Silvia Pintor	Emmanuelle Bernard
May	Cláudia Liz	Bob Wolfenson
June	Betty Prado	Willy Biondani
July	Cássia Lara	Kenneth Willardt
August		
September	Carolina Fagundes	Bob Wolfenson
October	Isabella Fiorentino	Gui Paganini
November	Melanie Betti	Gui Paganini
December	Virgínia Punko	Bob Wolfenson

=== 1996 ===
Issue	Cover model	Photographer
January	Cássia Ávila	
February	Gilberto Gil	J.R. Duran
March		
April	Valeria Mazza	Kenneth Willardt
May	Jô Soares	Marcio Scavone
June	Adriane Galisteu	Fabio Cabral
July		
August	Silvia Pintor	Bob Wolfenson
September	Cássia Ávila	
October	Kim Lemanton	Kenneth Willardt
November	Elizabete de Paola	Gui Paganini
December	Elizabete de Paola	Willy Biondani

=== 1997 ===
Issue	Cover model	Photographer
January		
February	Cássia Ávila	Gui Paganini
March	Carmen Mayrink Veiga	Gui Paganini
April	Kim Lemanton	Kenneth Willardt
May	Fernanda Torres	Thelma Vilas Boas
June	Shirley Mallmann	
July	Adriana Restlé	Paulo Neto
August	Carolina Fagundes	Thomas Susemihl
September	Milla Jovovich	Terry Richardson
October (#259)	Gisele Bündchen	Kenneth Willardt
November	Camila Spinosa	Thelma Vilas Boas
December	Costanza Pascolato	

=== 1998 ===
Issue	Cover model	Photographer
January/February	Margareth Lahoussaye Duvigny	Guy Aroch
March		
April	Aline Moraes, Carol Fagundes, Virginia Punko, Ana Carolina	
May/June	Carolina Ferraz	Miro de Souza
June	Simone	Roger J. Cabello
July	Cristina Schtraitt	Miro de Souza
August	Shiraz	Vicente de Paulo
September	Adriana Restlé	Thomas Susemihll
October		
November	Cristiana Arcangeli	André Schiliró
December	Gisele Bündchen	

=== 1999 ===
Issue	Cover model	Photographer
January	Camila Spinosa	
February	Gisele Bündchen	Gui Paganini
March	Daniela Lopes	Tarcisio de Lima
April	Isabella Fiorentino	Gui Paganini
May	Carolina Ferraz	
June		
July	Ana Paola Frade, Maria Pia M. Ferraz, Luana Dantas	
August	Kate Moss	Tom Munro
September	Adriane Galisteu	
October	Camila Spinosa	
November	Maria Fernanda Cândido	
December	Gisele Bündchen	Steven Meisel

== 2000s ==
=== 2000 ===
Issue	Cover model	Photographer
January	Ana Hickmann	Tarciso Lima
February	Gisele Bündchen	Willy Biondani
March	Gisele Bündchen	Mario Testino
April	Sarah Schulze	Thelma Villas-Boas
May	Gisele Bündchen	Mario Testino
June	Caroline Ribeiro	Claudia Guimarães
July	Fabiane Nunes	Thelma Villas-Boas
August	Kate Moss	Mario Testino
September	Frankie Rayder	Mario Testino
October	Shirley Mallmann	Jacques Dequeker
November	Fernanda Tavares	Enrique Badulescu
December	Fernanda Tavares	Daniel Klajmic

=== 2001 ===
Issue	Cover model	Photographer
January	Michelle Ferrara	Enrique Badulescu
February	Marcelle Bittar	Mario Testino
March	Carmen Kass	Tom Munro
April	Michelle Alves	Willy Biondani
May	Marina Dias	Miro de Souza
June	Daniela Lopes	Daniel Klajmic
July	Bianca Klamt Motta	Henrique Gendre
August	Ana Hickmann	Miro de Souza
September	Raica Oliveira	Tiago Molinos
October	Linda Evangelista	Steven Meisel
November	Carolina Ferraz	Jacques Dequeker
December	Ana Hickmann	Miro de Souza

=== 2002 ===
Issue	Cover model	Photographer
January/February	Luciana Curtis	Paulo Vainer
March	Naomi Campbell	Daniel Klajmic
April	Ana Cláudia Michels	Jacques Dequeker
May	Ana Hickmann; Ana Tereza Bardella; Bruna Lombardi; Camila Pitanga; Carolina Ferraz; Fernanda Lima; Fernanda Tavares; Luana Piovani; Malu Mader; Xuxa	Miro de Souza
June	Fernanda Tavares	Miro de Souza
July	Fernanda Tavares	Bob Wolfenson
August	Gisele Bündchen	Bob Wolfenson
September	Ana Hickmann	Jacques Dequeker
October	Gisele Bündchen	Mario Testino
November	Karolína Kurková	J.R. Duran
December	Sandra Steuer	Gui Paganini

=== 2003 ===
Issue	Cover model	Photographer
January	Luiza; Yasmin Brunet	Luiz Garrido
February	Gisele Bündchen	Bob Wolfenson
March	Caroline Ribeiro	Jorge Lepesteuer
April	Caroline Ribeiro	Jacques Dequeker
May	Marilyn Monroe	Bert Stern
July	Ana Hickmann; Dorival Caymmi	Miro de Souza
August	Adriana Lima	Daniel Klajmic
September	Adriana Lima	Miro de Souza
October	Luciana Gimenez	Miro de Souza
November	Ana Beatriz Barros	Gui Paganini
December	Fernanda Motta	Paschoal Rodriguez

=== 2004 ===
Issue	Cover model	Photographer
January/February	Jeísa Chiminazzo	Paschoal Rodriguez
March	Isabeli Fontana	Jacques Dequeker
April	Ana Beatriz Barros	Miro de Souza
May	Caroline Trentini	Jacques Dequeker
June	Bruna Erhardt	Bob Wolfenson
July	Liliane Ferrarezi	Miro de Souza
August	Jeísa Chiminazzo	Paschoal Rodriguez
September	Gianne Albertoni	Paschoal Rodriguez
October	Michelle Alves	Jacques Dequeker
November	Caroline Ribeiro	Thelma Vilas Boas
December	Loiani Bienow	André Passos

=== 2005 ===
Issue	Cover model	Photographer
January/February	Gisele Bündchen	Bob Wolfenson; Gui Paganini; Henrique Gendre; J.R. Duran; Thelma Vilas Boas; Paulo Vainer; Veronica Casetta
March	Ana Cláudia Michels	Jacques Dequeker
April	Isabeli Fontana	Jacques Dequeker
May	Caroline Trentini	Gui Paganini
June	Cintia Dicker	Jacques Dequeker
July	Michelle Alves	J.R. Duran
August	Barbara Berger	Gui Paganini
September	Madonna	Tim Walker
October	Isabeli Fontana	Jacques Dequeker
November	Fernanda Lima	Jacques Dequeker
December	Izabel Goulart	Gui Paganini

=== 2006 ===
Issue	Cover model	Photographer
January	Michelle Alves	Jacques Dequeker
February	Naomi Campbell	Gui Paganini
March	Alinne Moraes	Jacques Dequeker
April	Isabeli Fontana	Jacques Dequeker
May	Gisele Bündchen	Jacques Dequeker
June	Solange Wilvert	Jacques Dequeker
July	Kim Noorda	Jacques Dequeker
August	Caroline Trentini	Jacques Dequeker
September	Gianne Albertoni	Jacques Dequeker
October	Renata Kuerten	Henrique Gendre
November	Raquel Zimmermann	Henrique Gendre
December	Isabeli Fontana	Gui Paganini

=== 2007 ===
Issue	Cover model	Photographer
January	Caroline Trentini	Gui Paganini
February	Isabeli Fontana	Bob Wolfenson
March	Daria Werbowy	Gui Paganini
April	Isabeli Fontana	Gui Paganini
May	Raquel Zimmermann	Henrique Gendre
June	Sheila Baum	Gui Paganini
July	Jeísa Chiminazzo	Henrique Gendre
August	Camila Pitanga	Paulo Vainer
September	Isabeli Fontana	Jacques Dequeker
October	Ana Beatriz Barros	Isabel Garcia
November	Isadora di Domenico	Jacques Dequeker
December	Vlada Roslyakova	Henrique Gendre

=== 2008 ===
Issue	Cover model	Photographer
January	Raquel Zimmermann	Henrique Gendre
February	Caroline Trentini	Gui Paganini
March	Coco Rocha	Jacques Dequeker
April	Flávia de Oliveira	Jacques Dequeker
May	Daria Werbowy	Gui Paganini
June	Isabeli Fontana	J.R. Duran
July	Naomi Campbell	David Bailey
August	Daniela Borges; Claudia Seiler; Nathalie Edenburg; Luana Teifke; Luiza Windberg	Jacques Dequeker
September	Isabeli Fontana	Jacques Dequeker
October	Viviane Orth	Gui Paganini
November	Flávia de Oliveira	Henrique Gendre
December	Madonna	Steven Klein

=== 2009 ===
Issue	Cover model	Photographer
January	Renata Kuerten	Gui Paganini
February	Aline Weber; Daiane Conterato; Bruna Tenório; Viviane Orth	Gui Paganini
March	Agyness Deyn	Jacques Dequeker
April	Ana Cláudia Michels	Gui Paganini
May	Michelle Alves	Steven Klein
June	Isabeli Fontana	Jacques Dequeker
July	Caroline Trentini	Terry Richardson
August	Aline Weber	Gui Paganini
September	Ana Cláudia Michels	Jacques Dequeker
October	Raquel Zimmermann	Henrique Gendre
November	Flávia de Oliveira	Fabio Bartelt
December	Madisyn Ritland	Stephane Gallois

== 2010s ==
=== 2010 ===
Issue	Cover model	Photographer
January	Renata Kuerten	Fabio Bartelt
February	Isabeli Fontana	Fabio Bartelt
March	Barbara Berger	Jacques Dequeker
April	Renata Sozzi	Bob Wolfenson
May	Isabeli Fontana; Caroline Trentini; Fernanda Tavares; Izabel Goulart; Emanuela de Paula; Aline Weber; Gracie Carvalho; Caroline Ribeiro; Ana Cláudia Michels; Barbara Berger	Gui Paganini
June	Bruna Tenório	Jacques Dequeker
July	Alessandra Ambrosio	Jacques Dequeker
August	Renata Kuerten	Jacques Dequeker
September	Renata Sozzi	Gui Paganini
October	Gisele Bündchen	Jacques Dequeker
November	Isabeli Fontana	Patrick Demarchelier, Victor Demarchelier
December	Raquel Zimmermann	Henrique Gendre

=== 2011 ===
Issue	Cover model	Photographer
January	Emanuela de Paula	Jacques Dequeker
February	Adriana Lima	Fabio Bartelt
March	Freja Beha Erichsen	Henrique Gendre
April	Aline Weber	James Macari
May	Kate Moss	Mario Testino
June	Raquel Zimmermann	Henrique Gendre
July	Gisele Bündchen	Jacques Dequeker, Patrick Demarchelier
August	Isabeli Fontana	Jacques Dequeker
September	Georgia May Jagger	Renam Christofoletti
October	Candice Swanepoel	J.R. Duran
November	Karolína Kurková	J.R. Duran
December	Alessandra Ambrosio; Rodrigo Santoro	Éric Guillemain

=== 2012 ===
Issue	Cover model	Photographer
January	Tayane Leão; Laís Ribeiro; Marcélia Freesz	J.R. Duran
February	Adriana Lima	André Passos
March	Carola Remer	Jacques Dequeker
April	Rosie Huntington-Whiteley	Henrique Gendre
May	Sharon Stone	Alix Malka
June	Isabeli Fontana	J.R. Duran
July	Gisele Bündchen	Patrick Demarchelier
August	Bianca Balti	Fernando Lombardi
September	Caroline Trentini	Fabio Bartelt
October	Lara Stone	Mario Testino
November	Constance Jablonski	Henrique Gendre
December	Isabeli Fontana	Jacques Dequeker

=== 2013 ===
Issue	Cover model	Photographer
January	Joan Smalls	Henrique Gendre
February	Bette Franke; Izabel Goulart; Magdalena Frackowiak; Mirte Maas	Giampaolo Sgura
March	Alessandra Ambrosio	Fabio Bartelt
April	Aline Weber	Jacques Dequeker
April	Rosie Huntington-Whiteley	Henrique Gendre
May	Naomi Campbell	Tom Munro
June	Gisele Bündchen	Mario Testino
July	Kate Upton	Henrique Gendre
August	Lindsey Wixson	Jacques Dequeker
September	Isabeli Fontana; Ben Harper	Jacques Dequeker
October	Adriana Lima	Giampaolo Sgura
November	Karlie Kloss	Henrique Gendre
December	Gisele Bündchen	Giampaolo Sgura

=== 2014 ===
Issue	Cover model	Photographer
January	Candice Swanepoel	Mariano Vivanco; Zee Nunes
February	Cara Delevingne	Jacques Dequeker
March	Alessandra Ambrosio	Mariano Vivanco
April	Ana Beatriz Barros; Aline Weber; Isabeli Fontana; Izabel Goulart; Renata Kuerten; Rhayene Polster; Barbara Beluco	Jacques Dequeker
May	Rihanna	Mariano Vivanco
June	Gisele Bündchen; Neymar	Mario Testino
July	Karlie Kloss	Henrique Gendre
August	Irina Shayk	Giampaolo Sgura
September	Adriana Lima	Ellen von Unwerth
October	Caroline Trentini	Arthur Elgort
November	Amanda Wellsh; Aline Weber	Giampaolo Sgura
December	Gisele Bündchen	Karl Lagerfeld

=== 2015 ===
Issue	Cover model	Photographer
January	Alessandra Ambrosio	Patrick Demarchelier
February	Natasha Poly	Jacques Dequeker
March	Amanda Wellsh	Zee Nunes
April	Fernanda Lima; Renata Vasconcellos; Thiago Jannuzzi; Glória Pires; Camila Pitanga; Fernanda Montenegro; Glória Maria; Paolla Oliveira; Angélica; Malu Mader; Grazi Massafera	Ellen von Unwerth
May	Gisele Bündchen	Inez & Vinoodh
June	Kim Kardashian	Ellen von Unwerth
July	Gigi Hadid	Henrique Gendre
August	Behati Prinsloo	Zee Nunes
September	Isabeli Fontana	Zee Nunes
October	Mariacarla Boscono; Riccardo Tisci; Naomi Campbell	Luigi & Iango
November	Caroline Trentini	J.R. Duran
December	Gisele Bündchen	François Nars

=== 2016 ===
Issue	Cover model	Photographer
January	Kendall Jenner	Russell James
February	Jourdan Dunn	Zee Nunes
March	Ari Westphal	Paulo Vainer
April	Alessandra Ambrosio	Mariano Vivanco
May	Naomi Campbell	Bob Wolfenson; Gui Paganini; Zee Nunes
June	Nicolas Ghesquière; Selena Gomez	Bruce Weber
July	Caroline Ribeiro; Lara Teixeira; Lorena Molinos; Pamela Nogueira	Henrique Gendre
August	Adriana Lima	Greg Kadel
September	Caroline Trentini	Zee Nunes
October	Isabeli Fontana; Alessandra Ambrosio	Mariano Vivanco
November	Gisele Bündchen	Nino Muñoz
December	Isabeli Fontana	Zee Nunes

=== 2017 ===
Issue	Cover model	Photographer
January	Irina Shayk	Giampaolo Sgura
February	Lais Ribeiro	Greg Kadel
March	Angelica Erthal; Lorena Maraschi	Zee Nunes
April	Ellen Rosa	Giampaolo Sgura
May	Josephine Skriver; Sara Sampaio; Stella Maxwell	Giampaolo Sgura
June	Joan Smalls	Zee Nunes
July	Mica Argañaraz	Rafael Pavarotti
August	Anna Ewers	Giampaolo Sgura
September	Bella Hadid	Gui Paganini
October	Isabeli Fontana	Rafael Pavarotti
November	Candice Swanepoel	Mert & Marcus
December	Valentina Sampaio	Gui Paganini

=== 2018 ===
Issue	Cover model	Photographer
January	Paris Jackson	Jacques Dequeker
February	Caroline Trentini	Rafael Pavarotti
March	Marina Ruy Barbosa	Zee Nunes
April	Ellen Rosa; Fernanda Oliveira; Linda Helena; Mia Brammer; Samile Bermannelli	Zee Nunes
May	Alessandra Ambrosio	Rafael Pavarotti
June	Birgit Kos	Mariana Maltoni
July	Blésnya Minher	Zee Nunes
August	Grace Elizabeth	Luigi & Iango
September	Gigi Hadid	Luigi & Iango
October	Vânia Bündchen; Gisele Bündchen	Zee Nunes
November	Taís Araújo	Zee Nunes
December	Shanelle Nyasiase	Zee Nunes

=== 2019 ===
Issue	Cover model	Photographer
January	Luna Bijl	Martin Parr
February	Karen Elson	Zee Nunes
March	Mica Argañaraz	Zee Nunes
April	Irina Shayk	Giampaolo Sgura
May	Anitta; Lellê; Sabrina Sato	Zee Nunes
June	Grace Elizabeth	Giampaolo Sgura
July	Marta Silva	Zee Nunes
August	Anok Yai; Alton Mason	Luigi & Iango
September	Gigi Hadid	Luigi & Iango
October	Christy Turlington	Luigi & Iango
November	Juliana Paes	Hick Duarte
December	Naomi Campbell	Luigi & Iango

== 2020s ==
=== 2020 ===
Issue	Cover model	Photographer
January	Ísis Valverde	Mariana Maltoni
February	Kerolyn Soares; Barbara Valente; Jamily Meurer; Ana Barbosa	Zee Nunes
March	Alek Wek	Luigi & Iango
April	Ivete Sangalo	Hick Duarte
May	Gisele Bündchen	Luigi & Iango
June		Gringo Cardia
July/August	Teresa Cristina	Mar+Vin
September	Emilly Nunes; Vanda Ortega; Uýra Sodoma; Rita Teixeira	Hick Duarte
October	Gloria Groove; Pabllo Vittar	Hick Duarte
November	Duda Beat; Rita Carreira; Preta Gil	Fernando Tomaz
December	Kat Graham; Marina Ruy Barbosa	Mariana Maltoni

=== 2021 ===
Issue	Cover model	Photographer
January	Abby Champion	Hick Duarte
February	Allana Santos Brito, Laiza de Moura	Edgar Azevedo
March	—N/a	OSGEMEOS
April	Hailey Bieber	Zoey Grossman
May	Cindy Crawford	Luigi & Iango
June/July	Precious Lee	Luigi & Iango
August	Nyaueth Riam	Zee Nunes
September	Binx Walton	Luigi & Iango
October	Jodie Turner-Smith	Zoey Grossman
November	Raynara Negrine	Mariana Maltoni
December	Babi Louise; Isadora Satie; Rita Carreira	Fernando Tomaz

=== 2022 ===
Issue	Cover model	Photographer/Artist
January	Dandara Queiroz	Hick Duarte
February	—N/a	Elian Almeida
March	Gigi Hadid	Zoey Grossman
April	Taís	Mar+Vin
May	Anitta	Zee Nunes
June/July	IZA	Lufré
August	Amanda Aucler; Ariane Aparecida; Santii da Sliva; Eloiza Bernardino; Fabio Mori	Hick Duarte
September	Sheila Bawar	Mar+Vin
October	Caroline Trentini	Mariana Maltoni
November	Laiza de Moura	Mar+Vin
December	Alcione	Gabriela Schmidt

=== 2023 ===
Issue	Cover model	Photographer
January	Isabeli Fontana	Lufré
February	Ludmilla	Fernando Tomaz
March	Candice Swanepoel	Lufré
April	Barbie Ferreira	Gabriela Schmidt
May	Bruna Marquezine	Lufré
June/July	Aweng Choul	Gabriela Schmidt
August	Gisele Bündchen	Lufré
September	Alek Wek	Zee Nunes
October	Maryel Uchida	Mariana Maltoni
November	Ashley Graham	Mar+Vin
December	Ivete Sangalo	Lufré

=== 2024 ===
Issue	Cover model	Photographer
January	Valentina Sampaio	Mariana Maltoni
February	Sabrina Sato	Fernando Tomaz
March	Barbara Valente	Lufré
April	Maria Klaumann	Lufré
May	Paloma Elsesser	Zee Nunes
June/July	Zaya Guarani	Mar+Vin
August	Raquel Zimmermann	Chris Colls
September	Gisele Bündchen	Lufré
October	Rebeca Andrade	Mar+Vin
November	Fernanda Torres	Zee Nunes
December	Costanza Pascolato	Bob Wolfenson

=== 2025 ===
Issue	Cover model	Photographer
January	Alessandra Ambrosio	Nicole Heiniger
February	Camila Pitanga	Mar+Vin
March	Adriana Lima	Zee Nunes
April	Taís Araújo	Mar+Vin
May	Sônia Guajajara; Anitta	Fernando Tomaz
May	Isabeli Fontana; Caroline Trentini	Lufré
May	Carlinhos Brown; Ney Matogrosso	Mar+Vin
May	Erika Hilton; Silvia Braz	Juliana Rocha
May	Luíza Brunet; Rita Carreira	Pedro Napolinário
May	Andrea Dellal; Sabrina Sato	Hick Duarte
May	Xuxa, Sasha	Mariana Maltoni
June/July	Daiane Sodre	Lufré
August	Irina Shayk	Lufré
September	Naomi Campbell	Mar+Vin
October	Joan Smalls	Lufré
November	Luíza Perote, Sheila Bawar, Carol Monteiro	Mar+Vin
December	Gisele Bündchen	Lufré

=== 2026 ===
Issue	Cover model	Photographer
January	Marieta Severo	Marcus Sabah
February	Bad Bunny	Mar+Vin
March	Bruna Marquezine	Mar+Vin
April	Iza	Mar+Vin
May	Zendaya	Nicole Heiniger
June/July	Liniker	Mar+Vin
August	Thalita Ferreira; Letícia Hall; Iasmin Reis; Josefa Santos; Victoria Blecher	Nicole Heiniger
September	Kate Moss	Zee Nunes
October	Anok Yai	Mar + Vin
November	Sabrina Sato	Gabriela Schmidt
December		
