= List of Elle Kazakhstan cover models =

This list of Elle Kazakhstan cover models (2015–present) is a catalog of cover models who have appeared on the cover of Elle Kazakhstan, the Kazakh edition of French lifestyle magazine Elle.

== 2010s ==
=== 2015 ===
Issue	Cover model	Photographer
February	Alyona Subbotina	
March	Rosie Huntington-Whiteley	Kai Z. Feng
April	Bianca Balti	Mark Pillai
May	Bar Refaeli	Xavi Gordo
June	Bruna Tenório	Richard Machado
July/August	Bibi Sharipova	Kyoko Munakata
September	Alexa Chung	Yuan Gui Mei
October	Shakira	Jaume de Laiguana
November	Sibui Nazarenko	Lena Manakai
December	Nastya Kusakina	Lena Manakai

=== 2016 ===
Issue	Cover model	Photographer
January/February	Lucy McIntosh	F&G Photography
March	Kate King	Hudson Taylor
April	Valentina Zelyaeva	Hudson Taylor
May	Beyoncé	Paola Kudacki
June	Nina Agdal	Masha Maltsava
July/August	April Popelysheva	Aleksey Koshelev
September	Amalie Lund	David Burton
October	Anna Vivchar	Daniela Rettore
November	Ilana Kozlov	Yossi Michaeli
December	Miranda Kerr	Nino Muñoz

=== 2017 ===
Issue	Cover model	Photographer
January/February	Aline Weber	Yossi Michaeli
March	Alyssa Miller	Masha Maltsava
April	Djaja Baecke	Daniela Rettore
May	Katya Riabinkina	Lena Melnik
June	Bruna Tenório & Dasha Maletina	Yossi Michaeli
July/August	Sonya Gorelova	Lena Melnik
September	Hannah Holman	Amanda Pratt
