= Ari Westphal =

Brazilian fashion model (born 1994)

- Born: 12 May 1994 (age 31); Vitória, Espírito Santo, Brazil
- Occupation: Model
- Children: 1
- Modeling information
- Height: 1.76 m (5 ft 9 1/2 in)
- Hair color: Brown
- Eye color: Hazel
- Agency: One Management (New York, Barcelona); New Madison (Paris); Wilhelmina Models (London); Skins Model Management (Amsterdam); Live Management (Belo Horizonte); Model Management (Hamburg); BOSSA Mgt. (São Paulo); Partners (São Paulo) (mother agency)

Ariely Westphal (born May 12, 1994) is a Brazilian fashion model.

== Career ==
Westphal was discovered by a modeling agency in her hometown of Belo Horizonte and debuted as a semi-exclusive for Chloé in the Fall Winter 2015 season, including runway and campaigns, and Brandon Maxwell.

On the runway she modeled for brands such as Chanel, 3.1 Phillip Lim, Kenzo x H&M, Tom Ford, Sonia Rykiel, Belstaff, Saks Fifth Avenue, Stella McCartney, and Vivienne Westwood.

Westphal has been on the cover of Vogue Brasil, Elle Brasil, and Harper's Bazaar Netherlands among others. She can be seen alongside models like Adwoa Aboah, Maria Borges, and Issa Lish in Sephora's Let's Beauty Together campaign.

Westphal has been frequently deemed a future supermodel and is called "the next Gisele Bündchen" by Brazilian media and Vogue.

She is known for her short haircut.

== Personal life ==
She is of Italian Brazilian, German Brazilian, and Afro-Brazilian descent. Before modeling, she was studying law in Minas Gerais, her home state. In July 2024, she gave birth to her first child.
