= Santa Clara do Sul =

Municipality of Rio Grande do Sul, Brazil

- Municipality
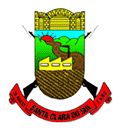
- Flag Coat of arms

- Location within Rio Grande do Sul

- Location in Brazil
- Coordinates: 29°28′S 52°05′W
- Country: Brazil
- State: Rio Grande do Sul

Population (2022)
  - Total: 6,887
- Time zone: UTC−3 (BRT)

Santa Clara do Sul is a municipality in the state of Rio Grande do Sul, Brazil. By 2020 its population was 6,681.

== See also ==
- List of municipalities in Rio Grande do Sul
