= Daniela Braga =

Brazilian model (born 1992)

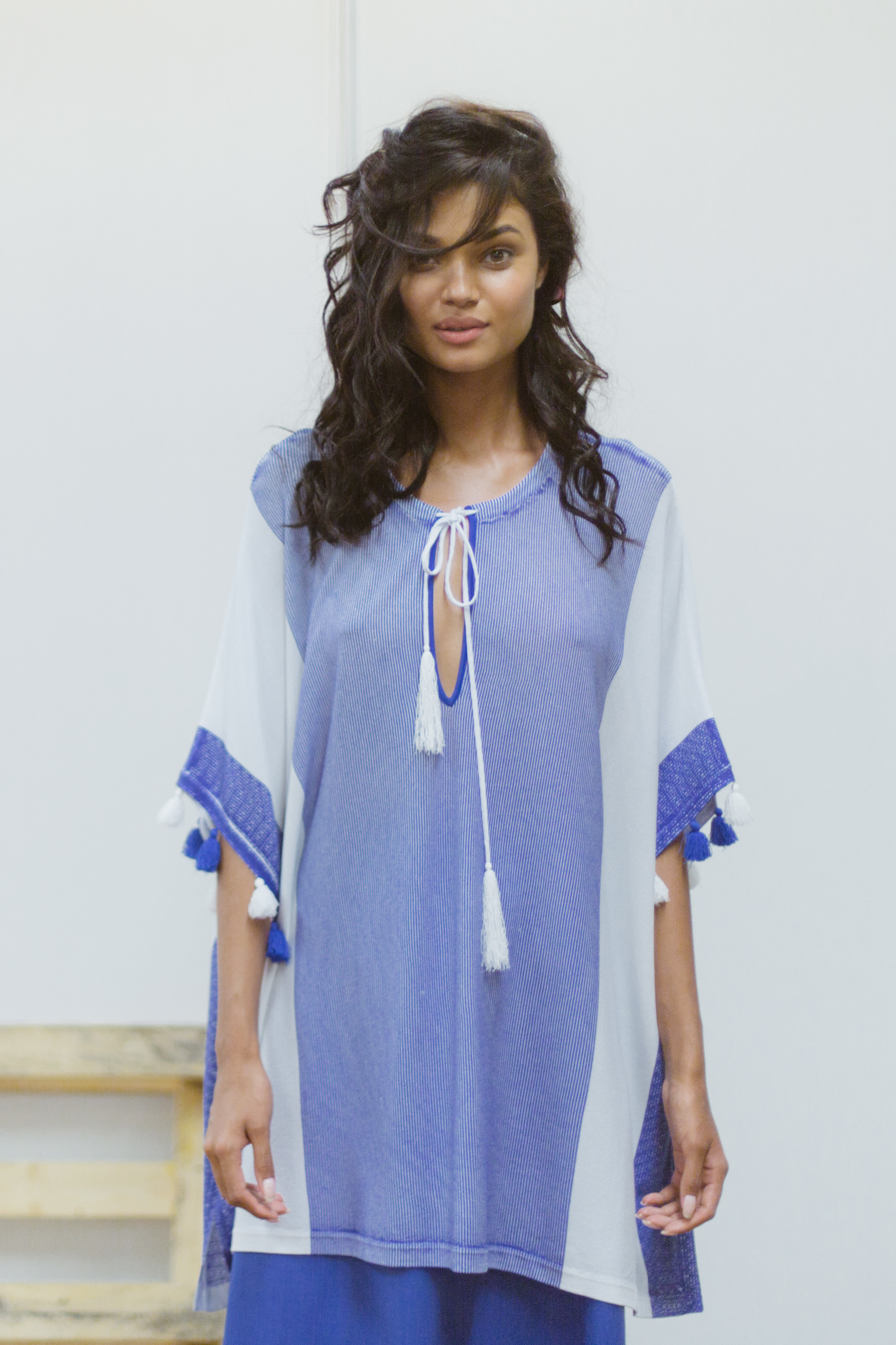
- Braga in 2015
- Born: 23 January 1992 (age 33); São Paulo, Brazil
- Occupation: Model
- Years active: 2011–present
- Spouse: Adam Freede
- Children: Onyx Braga Freede
- Modeling information
- Height: 1.82 m (5 ft 11 1/2 in)
- Hair color: Brown
- Eye color: Hazel
- Agency: Next Management (Paris, Milan); Elite Model Management (New York); Traffic Models (Barcelona); Modelwerk (Hamburg); Le Management (Copenhagen); We Are Models (Lisboa); Mega Model Brasil (Sao Paulo); MIKAs (Stockholm)
- Website: danybraga.com

Daniela "Dany" Braga (born 23 January 1992) is a Brazilian model.

== Career ==
Daniela has been featured on the cover of Harper's Bazaar, V, Elle, French Revue des Modes, and in editorials for Vogue (UK), CR Fashion Book, Harper's Bazaar, Interview, Marie Claire, Numéro, Purple, U and Vision China.

She was featured in the Victoria's Secret Fashion Show in 2014, 2015, 2016 and 2017.

She has walked in fashion shows for Balmain, Givenchy, Blumarine, Ermanno Scervino, Etam, Alexandre Vauthier, Anthony Vaccarello, Leonard, Loewe, Maiyet, Max Mara, Moncler, Paco Rabanne, Shiatzy Chen, Valentin Yudashkin, Victoria's Secret and Vionnet among others.

She has starred in advertisements for mega brands including Givenchy, Saks Fifth Avenue, Bebe, Blanco, Dafiti, Nordstrom, Plein Sud, Pull & Bear, Riachuelo and Target.

== Personal life ==
Since the end of 2018, she has been in a relationship with Adam Freede, an American businessman. On 26 September 2020, they became engaged. In December 2021, Daniela and Adam were married at Amanera in the Dominican Republic during a week-long wedding celebration with 75 guests. On 31 March 2022, she announced that she was expecting her first child.

Braga is a convert to Judaism, her husband's religion.

== Acting credits ==
=== Television ===
| Year | Title | Role | Notes |
|---|---|---|---|
| 2019 | Prodigal Son | Tatiana | Episode: "Designer Complicity" |
