= Luma Grothe =

Brazilian model

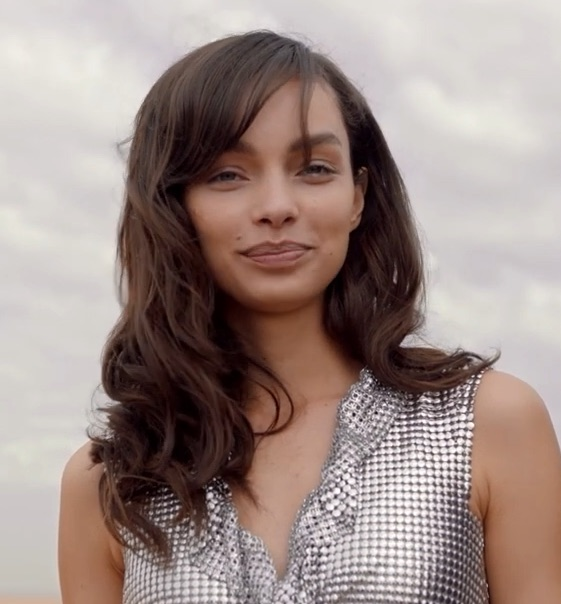
- Grothe in 2019
- Born: 1993 or 1994 (age 31–32); Joinville, Santa Catarina, Brazil
- Occupation: Model
- Spouse: Daniel Turtel (m. 2024)
- Children: 1
- Modeling information
- Height: 1.75 m (5 ft 9 in)
- Hair color: Brown
- Eye color: Green
- Agency: Women Management (New York); Oui Management (Paris); Elite Model Management (Milan, Barcelona); Premier Model Management (London); Iconic Management (Berlin); IMM Bruxelles (Brussels); Le Management (Copenhagen); Photogenics LA (Los Angeles); Ford Models (Sao Paulo); MP Stockholm (Stockholm); Chic Management (Sydney)

Luma Grothe (born 1993/94) is a Brazilian model.

== Career ==
Luma Grothe started modeling in London, England, where she learned English. Grothe appears in campaigns for L'Oréal, Paco Rabanne. She has walked for Vivienne Westwood, Burberry, Versace and Etam. She made her Victoria's Secret Fashion Show debut in 2016.

== Personal life ==
Grothe was born in Joinville, Brazil. She is of German, Japanese and African descent.

On March 23, 2024, she married German writer Daniel Turtel. Six months later, she announced her pregnancy on Instagram. On March 22, 2025, they welcomed their first child, a boy.
