= Amanda Wellsh =

Brazilian model (born 1991)

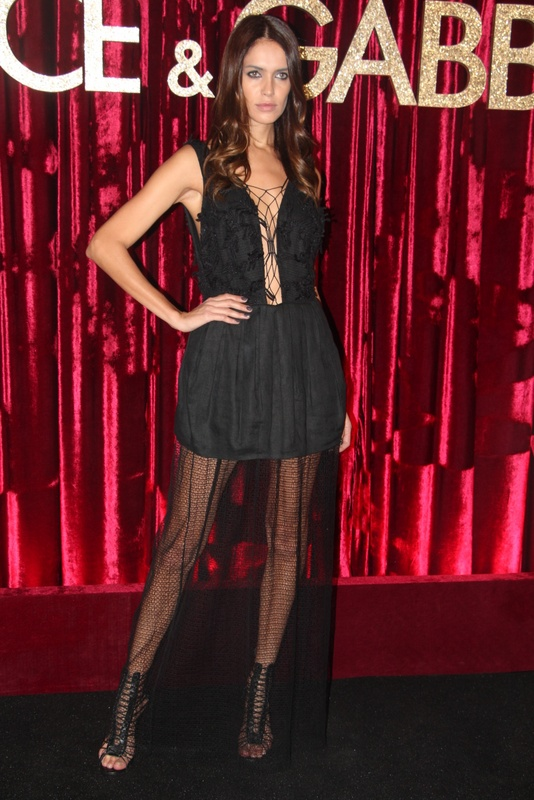
- Citizenship: Brazil
- Years active: 2013-current
- Spouse: Lucas Salvato
- Children: 2

Amanda Wellsh (born 1991) is a Brazilian model. Wellsh has appeared in advertorial campaigns for Gucci and has walked the runway for a number of international brands including Chanel, DKNY, Prada and Givenchy.

== Biography ==
Amanda Wellsh
- Modelling information
- Height: 179 cm (5 ft 10 in)
- Hair colour: brown
- Eye colour: blue
- Agency: IMG New York; IMG Paris; IMG Milano; IMG London; Uno Models; Modellink; BOSSA Mgt.

Wellsh grew up in Patos de Minas, Minas Gerais, Brazil, as the daughter of a lawyer and a biology teacher. As a child, she took swimming classes to stay active, after falling in love with the sea on a family trip. Wellsh found her start in modelling after her sister enrolled Amanda in a modelling workshop. There, she was scouted by an agent from São Paulo and asked to move to the city at age 15.

=== International debut ===
In 2013, Wellsh was booked to appear at New York Fashion Week. Wellsh opened the S/S 2014 Peter Som show and walked the runways for DKNY, Helmut Lang, Kenneth Cole, Oscar de La Renta, The Row and others. Wellsh would have her big break later that year, when she was chosen by Frida Giannini to open and close Gucci's runway presentation for S/S 2014 in Milan. Wellsh would go on to appear in Gucci's S/S 2014 advertorial campaign. Her participation in the campaign led to her walking in a number of campaigns for AW 2015, including Givenchy, Chanel, Prada and Alexander Wang. In Paris, she walked in 11 major fashion shows that season.

In 2015, she was named French Vogue's Model of the Year for 2014.

=== Personal life ===
At the time of her international debut at age 24, Wellsh was balancing her time as a model based in New York alongside being a mother to a young son, Pedro, who was living in Belo Horizonte, Brazil. In November 2018, Wellsh and her husband moved to Florida in an effort to raise their son near nature. Six years after the birth of her son, in January 2019, Wellsh covered Madame Figaro visibly pregnant. Inside, she revealed that she was pregnant with a daughter. In July 2019, Wellsh appeared inside Vogue Brazil with her daughter Amélie, from her home in Homestead, Florida.

== Covers ==
- October 2014, Numero #157
- Winter 2014, Muse
- November 2014, Vogue Brazil (with Aline Weber)
- November 2014, Vogue Netherlands
- March 2015, Vogue Brazil
- June 2015, Vogue Mexico.
- November 2015, Vogue Thailand
- November 2016, Vogue Ukraine.
- January 2017, Vogue Portugal.
- June 2017, Harper's Bazaar Ukraine.
- September 2017, TELVA Magazine
- January 2018 Harper's Bazaar Turkey.
- June 2018, ELLE Brasil.
- December 2019, December/January issue of Vogue Greece.
