= Shirley Mallmann =

Brazilian model (born 1977)

- Born: Shirley Patricia Mallmann; 15 February 1977 (age 49); Santa Clara do Sul, Rio Grande do Sul, Brazil
- Years active: 1995–present
- Spouse: Zaiya Latt (m. 2002)
- Children: 2
- Modeling information
- Height: 1.80 m (5 ft 11 in)
- Hair color: Blonde
- Eye color: Blue
- Agency: The Model CoOp (New York) d'management group (Milan); Francina Models (Barcelona); Core Artist Management (Hamburg); Way Model Management (Sao Paulo)

Shirley Patricia Mallmann (born February 15, 1977) is a Brazilian model. She is considered the first Brazilian top model and is best known for her work with Jean Paul Gaultier, who immortalized her silhouette in his first perfume, "Classique" in a 2002 ad. Known for her unique runway walk, Mallmann was also featured on multiple covers of Vogue, Elle, Marie Claire, Cosmopolitan among others worldwide. She was also named celebrity of the year by E! Entertainment in 1999.

== Early life and career ==
Mallmann was born in Santa Clara do Sul, Rio Grande do Sul. She is of German-Brazilian descent. Besides her native Portuguese, Mallmann also speaks German, English and Italian.

Before becoming a model, she worked in a shoe factory in Rio Grande do Sul until the age of 18. In 1995, she moved to São Paulo owning only R$300. Her first modeling job was in 1995 when she appeared on the cover of Brazilian Elle magazine.

Mallmann's international career began with the arrival of photographer Ellen von Unwerth in Brazil for Forum's 1996 winter campaign. Mallmann wasn't the main model in the campaign, but Von Unwerth turned her into the protagonist and nominated her for several jobs, such as the cover of the French Marie Claire with Patrick Demarchelier, the cover of the Italian Glamour magazine, and editorials for Harper's Bazaar and the Italian Vogue. Mallmann went to New York and returned to her country as a supermodel.

She appeared in the Pirelli Calendar photographed by Herb Ritts in June 1999, and was chosen by US TV channel E! as "Celebrity of the Year" in 1999.

In 2002, Mallmann starred in a commercial for Jean Paul Gaultier's perfume "Classique", who immortalized her silhouette in the bottle.

Her career includes runway for designers such as Valentino, Alexander McQueen, Oscar de la Renta, Alberta Ferretti, Bottega Veneta, Carolina Herrera, Christian Lacroix, Marc Jacobs, Prada, Chanel, Christian Dior, Miu Miu, Donna Karan, Giorgio Armani, Gianni Versace, Hermès, Ann Demeulemeester, Givenchy, Ralph Lauren, Vivienne Westwood, Anna Sui, Betsey Johnson, Richard Tyler, Anna Molinari, Badgley Mischka, Bill Blass, Blumarine, Chloé, Cynthia Rowley, Dirk Bikkembergs, Ellen Tracy, Fendi, Gianfranco Ferré, Lanvin, Nina Ricci, Dirk Bikkembergs, Helmut Lang, Kenzo, Guy Laroche, Roberto Cavalli, Alexandre Herchcovitch, Emanuel Ungaro, John Galliano, Karl Lagerfeld, Krizia, Max Mara, Mila Schön, Catherine Malandrino, Ocimar Versolato, Salvatore Ferragamo, Sonia Rykiel, Thierry Mugler, Alessandro Dell'Acqua, Gai Mattiolo, Iceberg, Hervé Léger, Rifat Özbek, Rocco Barocco and Sportmax.

She did advertisements for Yves Saint Laurent, Chanel, Jean Paul Gautier, Dolce and Gabbana, Colcci, Emporio Armani, Lacoste, Alberta Ferretti, Guess?, Gianfranco Ferré, La Perla, Roberto Cavalli, Vivara, Marks & Spencer, Blumarine and Saks, as well as a 2001 appearance in the Sports Illustrated Swimsuit Issue and the covers of multiple issues of Vogue, Elle and Marie Claire around the world.

Mallmann holds the record for the most appearances on the cover of Brazilian magazine Donna, being featured in 8 covers between 1995 and 2013.

In 2012, Mallmann appeared in a tribute to the James Bond franchise in celebration of its 50th anniversary for the Brazilian Elle magazine. She starred in a video directed by Manuel Nogueira titled "Bond Girl Reloaded", where she dons looks from Alexandre Herchcovitch and Balmain, while battling armed villains, ending in a fiery explosion.

== Personal life ==
Since 2002, Mallmann has been married to American hair stylist Zaiya Latt. They live in New York and have two sons, Axil, born in 2002, and Ziggy, born in 2008.

She is an ambassador of the international Sea Shepherd Conservation Society, which protects marine animals and deals with them in case of spilled oil.
