= Renata Kuerten =

Brazilian model and actress

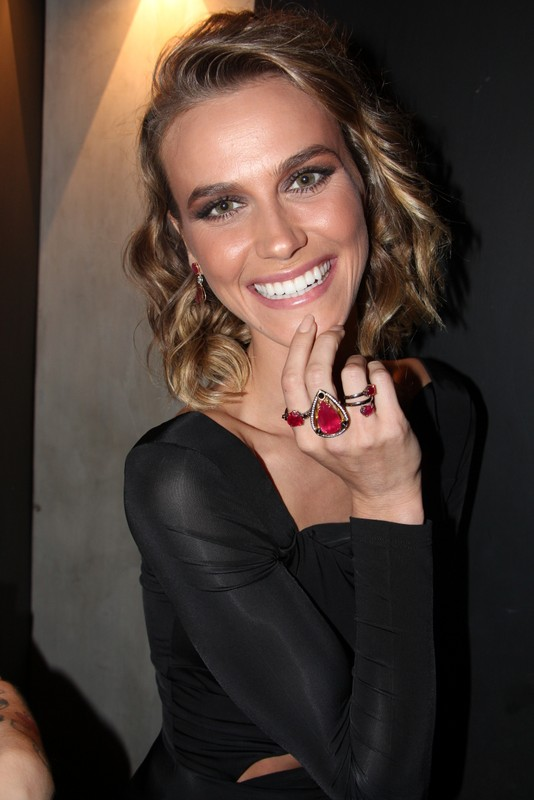
- Kuerten in 2015
- Born: 14 September 1988 (age 36); Braço do Norte
- Relatives: Gustavo Kuerten (distant cousin)

Renata Kuerten (born 14 September 1988) is a Brazilian model and TV presenter.

Kuerten was raised in Braço do Norte, Santa Catarina. She decided to become a model when she was ten years old and realized that dream when she was 16 years old.

Renata is the presenter for the programs, Conexão Models and Chega Mais, of RedeTV in Brazil.

== Personal life ==
Kuerten, a practising Roman Catholic, is in a long-term relationship with lawyer, Beto Senna, with whom she has a daughter. She is a distant cousin to the tennis player, Gustavo Kuerten.
