= Samile Bermannelli =

Brazilian fashion model

- Born: 22 May 1998 (age 28); Salvador, Bahia, Brazil
- Modeling information
- Height: 1.77 m (5 ft 9 1/2 in)
- Hair color: Brown
- Eye color: Brown
- Agency: Elite Model Management (New York, Beverly Hills, Miami Beach); Supreme Management (Paris); Special Management (Milan); The Squad (London); Uno Models (Barcelona); Canvas Management (New York)

Samile Bermannelli (born 22 May 1998) is a Brazilian fashion model.

== Early life and career ==
Bermannelli was born in Salvador, Bahia and was discovered by entering a local modeling contest. She has walked the runway for Prabal Gurung, Marchesa, Brandon Maxwell, Hermès, Dolce & Gabbana, Marc Jacobs, Trussardi, Alberta Ferretti, Valentino, Off-White, Kenzo, Nina Ricci, Mugler, Ralph Lauren, Balmain, Tommy Hilfiger, Salvatore Ferragamo, Viktor & Rolf, Fendi, H&M, and Miu Miu.

She has appeared in Vogue, Vogue Brasil, and Vogue Japan. She has appeared in three Vogue France editorials, she also appeared in Numéro France, British Vogue, American Vogue, Vogue Brasil, Vogue Arabia, Vogue Japan and a cover for Wonderland magazine. She has also appeared on 7 covers for Harper's Bazaar Brazil.

Bermannelli walked in the 2017 Victoria's Secret Fashion Show in Shanghai, China. That year, Models.com listed her as a ″Top Newcomer".
