= Luciana Curtis =

Brazilian model

Luciana Curtis (born December 12, 1976) is a Brazilian model. She was born in São Paulo to a Brazilian mother and an English father. She has been in advertisements for the likes of: Arden B., Bebe, Bergdorf Goodman, Charlie Miller, Coccinelle, CoverGirl, Harrods, H&M, Victoria's Secret, L'Oréal, and two years contract with Revlon. She began modeling at age 14.

She is married to photographer Henrique Gendre.
