= Ana Cláudia Michels =

Brazilian model and physician (born 1981)

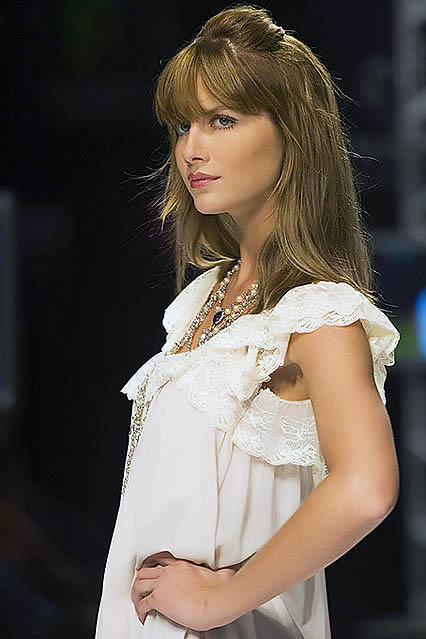
- Michels in 2006
- Born: July 31, 1981 (age 45); Joinville, Santa Catarina, Brazil
- Occupations: Model and Physician
- Years active: 1997–present
- Spouse: Augusto de Arruda Botelho (m. 2015)
- Children: 2
- Modeling information
- Height: 1.80 m (5 ft 11 in)
- Hair color: Blonde
- Eye color: Green
- Agency: Scoop Models (Copenhagen); Model Management (Hamburg); Way Model Management (São Paulo); THE.mgmt (Sydney)

Ana Cláudia Michels (born July 31, 1981) is a Brazilian model and physician.

== Biography ==
Michels was born in Joinville, Brazil. At the age of 14 she began to take a model course with the encouragement of her father. She was discovered by an agency in Florianópolis and immediately invited to a parade in Itajaí, Santa Catarina. At age 15, Ana Claudia started to parade for Ellus, Beneducci and Zoomp. At age 16, she left Brazil and went to New York City. On the same occasion, Ana Claudia was chosen to integrate the Chanel Tour and to cross Japan.

== Modeling career ==
Ana Claudia started modeling in 1997 with the Mega Agency, when she was introduced to the owners by a friend. She has appeared in catalogs for Victoria's Secret and Le Lis Blanc, a noted Brazilian clothing company, as well as Calvin Klein advertisements. She has also appeared in ads for companies like Burberry, Giorgio Armani, Louis Vuitton, Macy's, Nike, and Tommy Hilfiger, and has graced the covers of multiple international editions of Vogue.

== Medical doctor ==
In 2012, Ana Claudia was accepted by São Camilo Medical School in São Paulo, Brazil, from which she earned a medical degree in 2019. She joined the efforts against COVID-19 as a general practitioner.
