= Caroline Trentini =

Brazilian supermodel (born 1987)

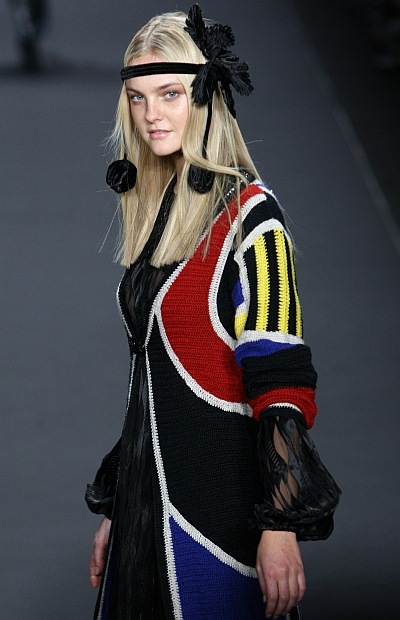
- Caroline Trentini walking for Anna Sui, February 2008
- Born: Caroline Aparecida Trentini; 6 July 1987 (age 39); Panambi, Rio Grande do Sul, Brazil
- Years active: 2002–present
- Spouse: Fabio Bartelt (m. 2012)
- Children: 2
- Modeling information
- Height: 1.84 m (6 ft 1/2 in)
- Hair color: Blonde
- Eye color: Green
- Agency: Ford Models (New York, Paris, Los Angeles); Elite Model Management (Milan, Barcelona); Next Model Management (London); Model Management (Hamburg); Way Model Management (Sao Paulo); Stockholmsgruppen (Stockholm); Zucca Model Agency (Tokyo)

Caroline Aparecida Trentini (Brazilian Portuguese: [kaɾoˈlini tɾẽˈtʃini]; born 6 July 1987) is a Brazilian model. Known for her doll-like face, Trentini rose to fame after capturing Marc Jacob's attention and being cast on the ad campaign. As of 2024, Trentini has been on the cover of international Vogue, 40 times. Trentini ranks on the ''Icons'' list on models.com.

== Early life ==
Caroline Trentini was born on 6 July 1987 in Panambi, in the state of Rio Grande do Sul, Brazil. She is of Italian and German descent. After her father, Jacó Trentini, died when she was an infant, her mother, Lourdes, entered the workforce and raised Trentini and her two older sisters, Franciele and Elen, on her own.

Trentini began her modeling career in her early teens after being discovered by a modeling scout in her hometown. She moved to São Paulo to pursue professional modeling and quickly attracted attention from international agents, which led to her relocation to New York City and entry into the global fashion industry.

== Career ==
=== Early career (2000–2004) ===
Trentini began her modeling career in 2000 at about age 14 when she was spotted by a modeling scout in her hometown of Panambi, Rio Grande do Sul. She soon moved to São Paulo, a common destination for young Brazilian models, to pursue professional work and quickly gained attention for her potential. Within about a year, Trentini relocated to New York City to enter the international fashion circuit, where she adapted rapidly despite initially not speaking English.

Her breakthrough came when designer Marc Jacobs chose her for a Marc by Marc Jacobs advertising campaign photographed by Juergen Teller, a high-profile opportunity that helped establish her on the global fashion stage. Following that campaign, Trentini was booked for runway shows and campaigns for major fashion houses and designers including Versace, Vera Wang, Chanel, Dior, Dolce & Gabbana and Ralph Lauren. She also modeled for Victoria’s Secret and appeared on the covers of international editions of Vogue, including Vogue Russia and Vogue Brasil in May 2004.

=== Rise to prominence 2005- present ===
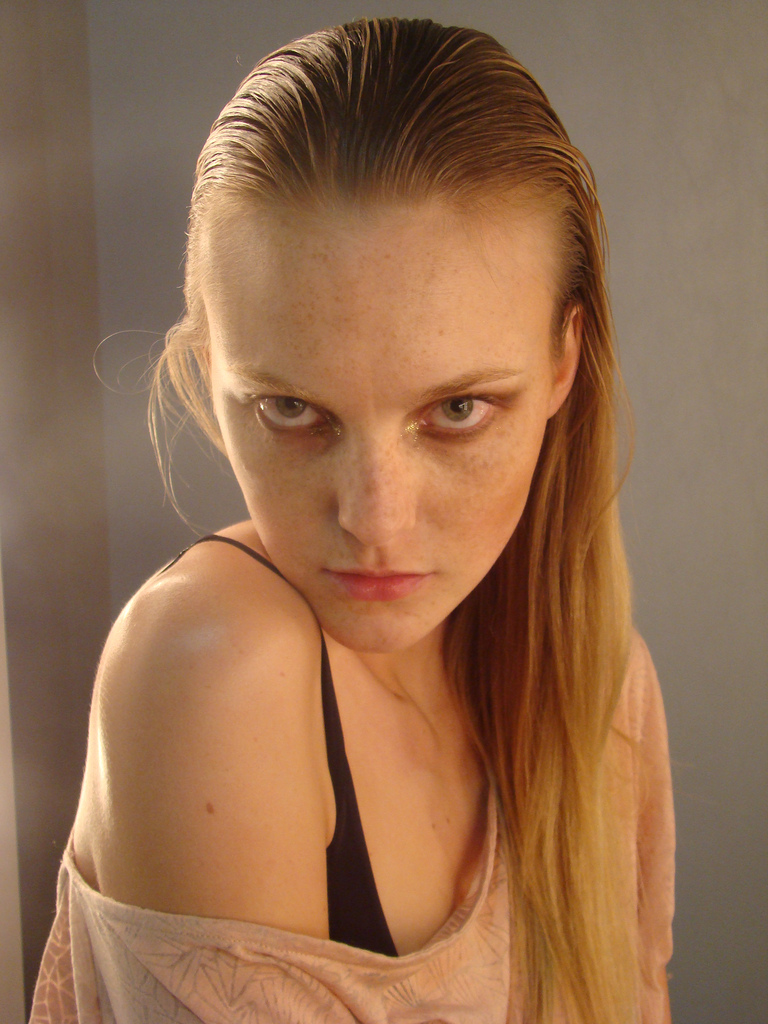
Caroline Trentini in 2010

In 2005 Trentini made her debut on the Victoria's Secret show. She also appeared on the cover of Vogue Italia in January 2005 photographed by Steven Meisel. She was also part of the Balenciaga and Dolce&Gabbana S/S 06 campaigns.

In 2007, she was the face of Gucci Cruise, Oscar de la Renta, Dolce & Gabbana Animelier, DSquared² and Mulberry. In 2008, she was the face on DKNY and Carlos Miele. In the May 2007 issue of American Vogue she was featured on the cover with fellow models: Doutzen Kroes, Jessica Stam, Raquel Zimmermann, Sasha Pivovarova, Agyness Deyn, Coco Rocha, Hilary Rhoda, Chanel Iman, and Lily Donaldson as the "World's Next Top Models." In 2008 casting agent James Scully, who is responsible to pick which model is to score a spot on top runways, says in regards to Trentini:

Perfect body. Always full of energy, always happy, and I have not met a better walker since Carmen Kass. She can model anything.

In early 2015, Trentini was hired as the face of Brazilian premium footwear brand Carrano for its 2016 Spring/Summer and Fall/Winter campaigns. She starred in the Spring/Summer 2016 advertisements photographed by Fabio Bartelt and styled by Heleno Manoel, and also appeared in the brand’s Winter 2016 campaign.

Caroline was ranked one of the Top 50 models and she is an industry icon according to Models.com website.

In recent years, Trentini has continued to be active on the international fashion circuit. In March 2025 she walked for Balmain during Paris Fashion Week under creative director Olivier Rousteing, drawing media attention to her continued presence in major runway shows.

She also appeared on the runway at the Metrópoles Catwalk in November 2025, where she walked for designer Lucila Pena, showcasing contemporary Brazilian fashion.

In July 2024, she opened the Herchcovitch & Alexandre show at Casa de Criadores in São Paulo, highlighting her ongoing involvement with Brazil’s fashion scene.

Trentini has also participated in editorial projects and interviews reflecting on her long career, including a 2025 series of discussions about longevity in fashion published by Vogue Brasil as part of the magazine’s 50th anniversary features.

== Personal life ==
Trentini dated photographer Victor Demarchelier, son of French photographer Patrick Demarchelier for about three years. Immediately after breaking up with Demarchelier, in early 2010, she got back together with Brazilian photographer Fabio Bartelt, who was her first boyfriend.

On 29 October 2011, both Trentini and Bartelt announced they were engaged. On 3 March 2012, Bartelt and Trentini were married on a church in Itajaí, Santa Catarina, Brazil. They have two sons: Bento Jacob Trentini Bartelt and Benoah Jacob.
