= Bruna Tenório =

Brazilian model (born 1989)

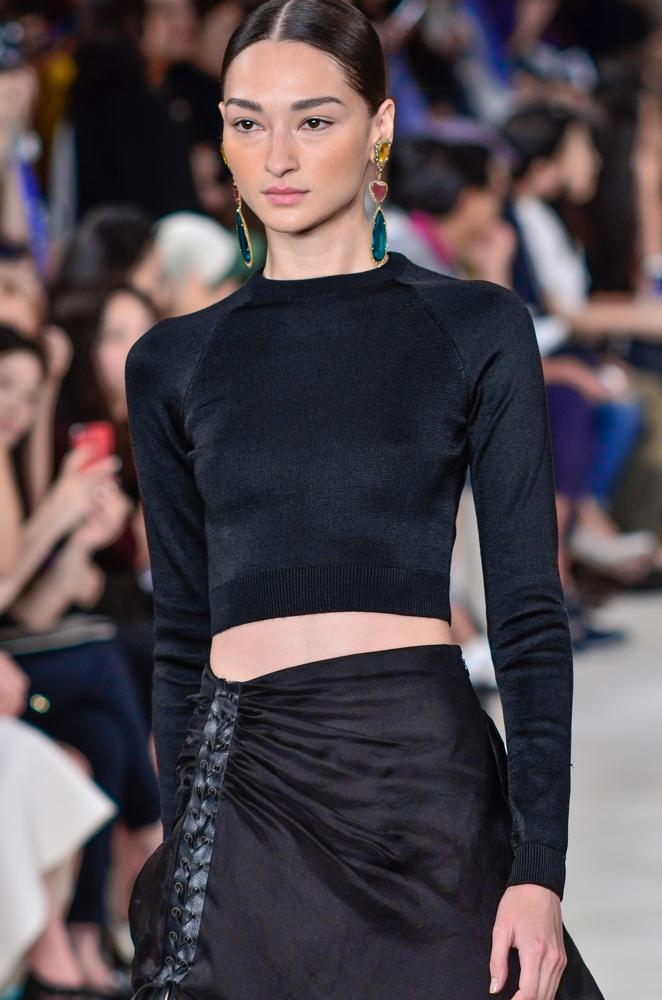
- Tenório walking the Ralph Lauren Spring/Summer in 2015
- Born: 27 June 1989 (age 36); Maceió, Alagoas, Brazil
- Occupation: Model
- Years active: 2006–present
- Spouse: Felipe Faria (m. 2017)
- Children: 1
- Modeling information
- Height: 5 ft 9.5 in (1.77 m)
- Hair color: Brown
- Eye color: Brown
- Agency: New York Model Management (New York); Elite Model Management (Paris, London); Women Management (Milan); Uno Models (Barcelona); Modellink (Gothenburg); DAS Model Management (Miami); Modelwerk (Hamburg)

Bruna Tenório (born 27 June 1989) is a Brazilian model.

== Personal life ==
Tenório was born in Maceió, Brazil. She is of Native Brazilian descent.

She married Felipe Faria in May 2017. They have a son, born December 2020.

== Career ==
Tenório started her career in 2006 when she walked the runway for designers like Chanel, Christian Dior and Dolce & Gabbana in Paris and Milan. After that, she was already featured as a rising star by Style.com.

Since her debut, in 2006, Tenório has been the face of advertising campaigns including Anna Sui, Gap, Kenzo, D&G, Chanel Haute Couture, Vera Wang, Valentino Haute Couture, Me & city. She has been on the covers of top fashion magazines including international editions of L'Officiel, Vogue and Elle. She has walked the most important shows in the Paris, New York and Milan fashion seasons like Alexandre Herchcovitch, Chanel, Dolce & Gabbana, Louis Vuitton, Marc Jacobs, Versace, Carolina Herrera, Christian Dior, Michael Kors and many others.

Tenório is represented by Women Model Management in New York, Paris and Milan, Storm Models in London and Ford Models in São Paulo.
