= Gisele Bündchen =

Brazilian fashion model (born 1980)

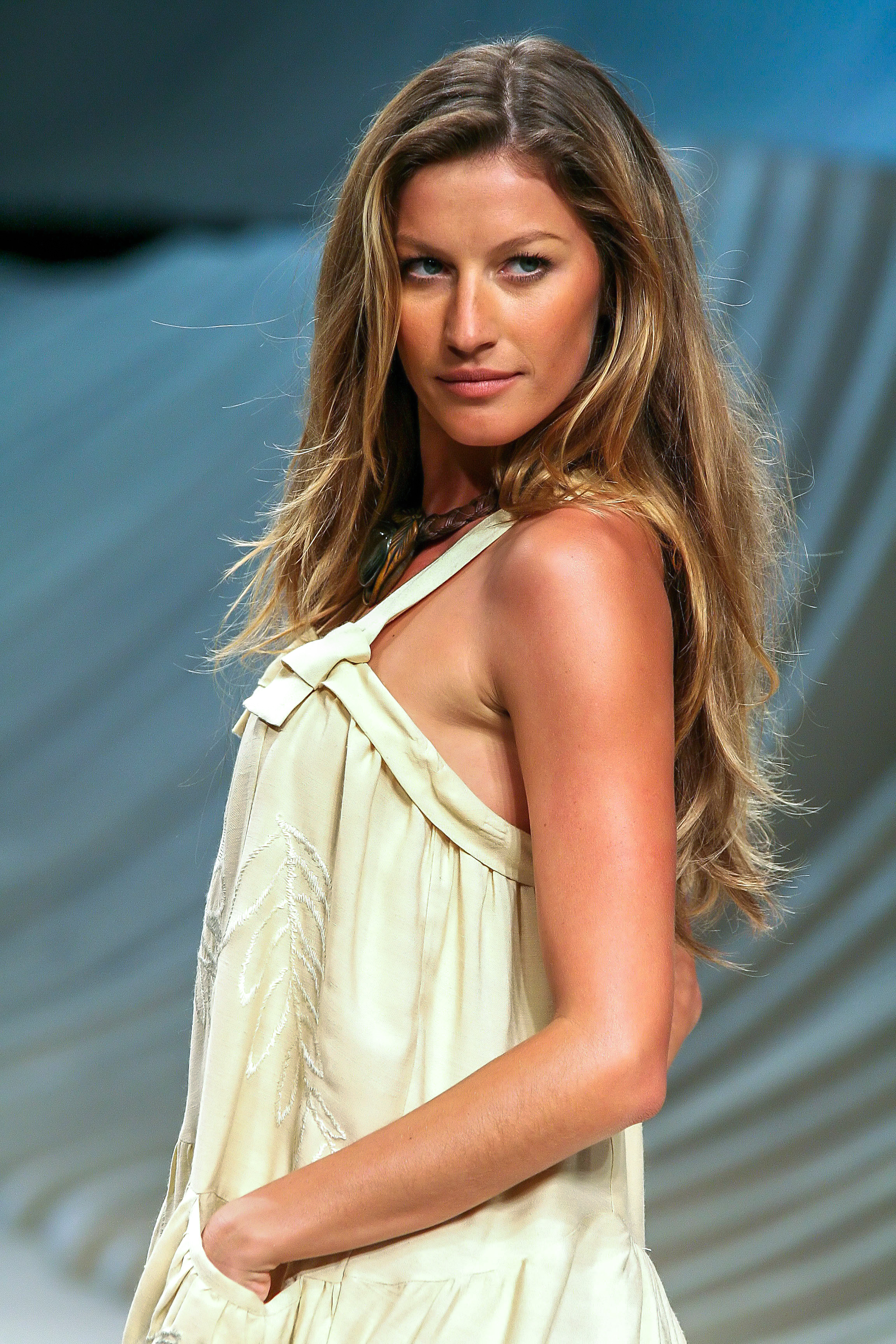
- Bündchen at the 2007 Fashion Rio Verão
- Born: Gisele Caroline Bündchen; 20 July 1980 (age 46); Horizontina, Rio Grande do Sul, Brazil
- Occupations: Model; activist
- Years active: 1996–present
- Spouses: Tom Brady (m. 2009; div. 2022) Joaquim Valente (m. 2025)
- Children: 3
- Modeling information
- Height: 5 ft 11 in (1.80 m)
- Hair color: Blonde (dyed)
- Eye color: Blue
- Agency: Option Model Agency (Zurich); Model Management (Hamburg)

Gisele Caroline Bündchen (Brazilian Portuguese: [ʒiˈzɛli ˈbĩtʃẽ], German: [ˈbʏntçn̩]; born 20 July 1980) is a Brazilian supermodel and activist. Since 2001, she has been one of the highest-paid models in the world. Bündchen is widely regarded as one of the most influential supermodels of all time. She is credited with redefining the fashion industry’s beauty standards and ushering in a new era of global supermodel dominance. In 2007, she was the 16th-richest woman in the entertainment industry and earned the top spot on Forbes highest-paid models list from 2005 to 2016. In 2014, she was listed as the 89th most powerful woman in Media and Entertainment by Forbes.

Vogue credited Bündchen with bringing the heroin chic era of modeling to an end in 1999. She was a Victoria's Secret Angel from 1999 to 2006. Bündchen is credited with pioneering and popularizing the "horse walk", a stomping movement where a model lifts her knees high and kicks her feet to step. In 2007, Basia Kolen of Vogue called Bündchen the only remaining supermodel. She has appeared on more than 1,200 magazine covers.

Bündchen was nominated for Choice Movie Female Breakout Star and for Choice Movie Villain at the 2005 Teen Choice Awards for her supporting role in Taxi (2004). She had a supporting role in The Devil Wears Prada (2006) and was the executive producer of an educational environmental cartoon, Gisele & the Green Team, from 2010 to 2011. In 2016, Bündchen appeared in the Emmy Award–winning documentary series Years of Living Dangerously, in the episode "Fueling the Fire". Her charitable endeavors include Save the Children, the Red Cross, and Doctors Without Borders. Bündchen has been a Goodwill Ambassador for the United Nations Environment Program since 2009.

== Family and early life ==
Gisele Caroline Bündchen, a sixth-generation German Brazilian, was born on 20 July 1980 in Horizontina, Rio Grande do Sul, to Valdir Bündchen, a university professor, and Vânia Nonnenmacher (1948–2024), a banker. Her grandfather, Walter Bündchen, once served as mayor of Horizontina. Bündchen grew up with five sisters including a fraternal twin. The family is Catholic. Although her parents speak German and Bündchen studied German in school, she never truly learned the language. Besides her native Portuguese, Bündchen speaks English fluently.

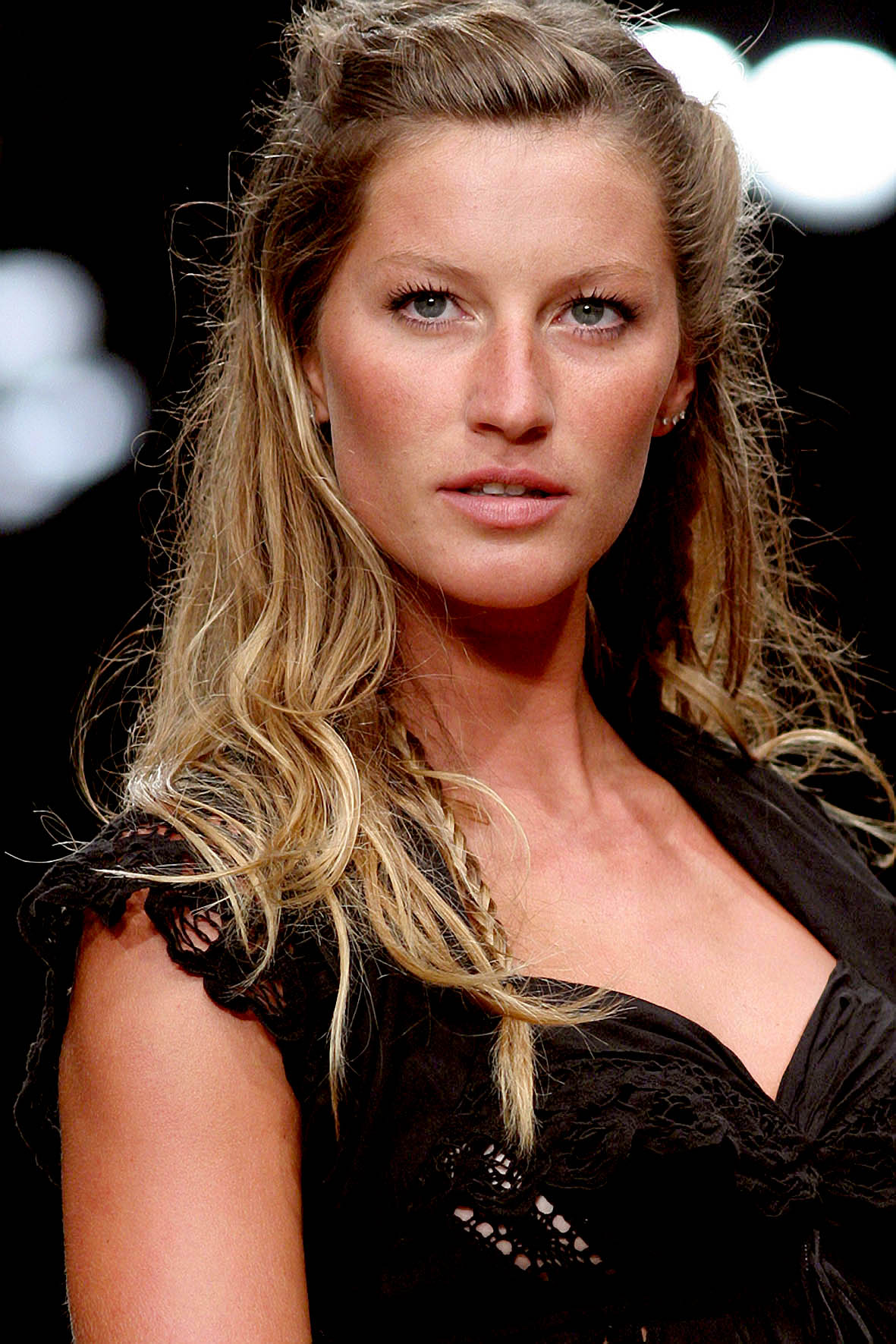
Bündchen in 2006

Bündchen aspired to be a volleyball player, but in 1993, her mother enrolled her and her sisters, Patrícia and Gabriela, in a modeling course to teach them confidence and better posture. After the course ended, the girls were rewarded by a trip to Curitiba, São Paulo and Rio de Janeiro, where Bündchen was discovered by Elite Model Management at a shopping center. She was placed second in a national contest, Elite Model Look, that was then known as Look of the Year. In 1995, Bündchen moved to São Paulo to launch her modeling career. The following year, Bündchen debuted at New York Fashion Week.

== Career ==
=== 1996–2000: Career beginnings ===
Bündchen began her modelling career in 1996. The following year, she was rejected 42 times in London before being cast in an Alexander McQueen runway show, Untitled, in 1998. In 1998, Bündchen posed for Missoni, Chloé, Dolce & Gabbana, Valentino, Gianfranco Ferré, Ralph Lauren, and Versace campaigns. She appeared on the cover of Vogue Paris, her first cover of British Vogue, and i-D, which featured her on its cover, profiling "A Girl Called Gisele". Dissatisfied with Elite Model Management's work environment, Bündchen signed with IMG Models in 1999.

Bündchen's first U.S Vogue cover, where Vogue announced Bündchen was "the return of the sexy model", was the first of three Vogue covers for her in 1999. In November, she appeared in a group Vogue cover with Kate Moss, Amber Valletta, Christy Turlington, Iman, Lauren Hutton, Naomi Campbell, Stephanie Seymour, Claudia Schiffer, Lisa Taylor, Paulina Porizkova, Carolyn Murphy, and Patti Hansen, and appeared in a solo U.S. Vogue cover in December. Bündchen won the VH1/Vogue Model of the Year in 1999. After appearing in five major campaigns at age 18, New York magazine editor Sally Singer deemed Bündchen an "über" model.

Bündchen became the fourth model to appear on the cover of Rolling Stone magazine when she was named "The Most Beautiful Girl in the World" in 2000. In 2000, Vogue's online encyclopedia of models described Bündchen the world's hottest model and referred to her as "the Brazilian bombshell". That same year, Bündchen fronted the advertising campaign for Dior's newly launched Dior Saddle bag, photographed by Nick Knight. The campaign, which also featured model Rhea Durham, was part of John Galliano's Spring/Summer 2000 collection and was credited with attracting a younger demographic to the brand.

=== 2000–2008: Modeling breakthrough, international success, and acting debut ===
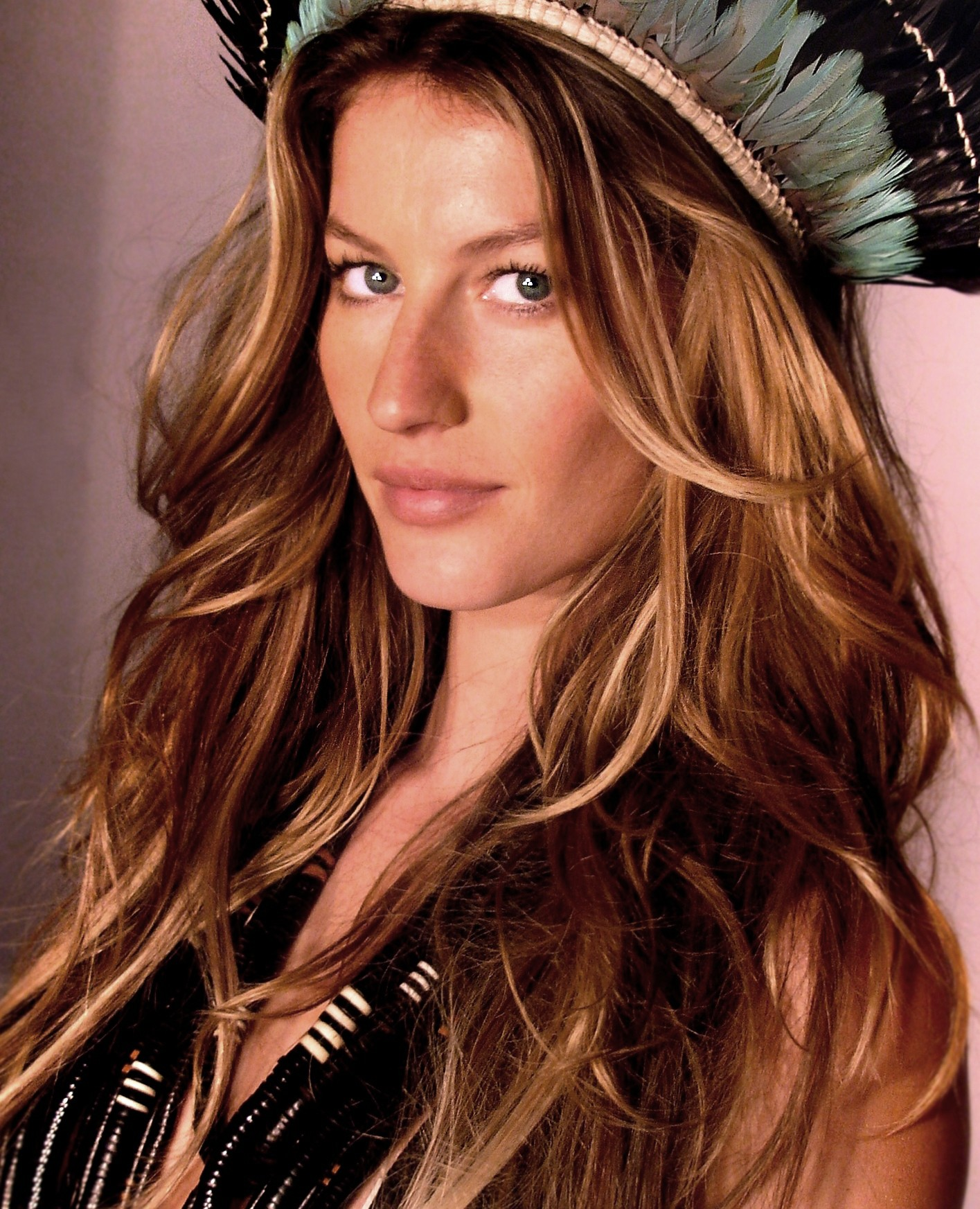
Bündchen in 2006

In 2000, Bündchen appeared on 37 international Vogue covers, including three in the American edition. In January 2000, she was featured on the covers of the U.S. and British editions of Vogue. For spring 2000 fashion week, Bündchen opened shows for Marc Jacobs, Michael Kors, Dolce & Gabbana, Christian Dior, and Valentino in New York, Milan and Paris. From 1998 to 2003, Bündchen was in 11 consecutive Dolce & Gabbana fashion campaigns. From 2006 to 2009, she became the face of Dolce & Gabbana's fragrance "The One". Bündchen retired from the runway after signing a five-year contract with Victoria's Secret.

In 2000, Bündchen wore Victoria's Secret's Red Hot Fantasy Bra worth $15 million and listed in Guinness World Records as the most expensive lingerie ever created. She modeled the Sexy Splendor Fantasy Bra in 2005, the second-most expensive bra valued at $12.5 million.

In 2004, Bündchen appeared on a group U.S. Vogue cover, with Daria Werbowy, Natalia Vodianova, Isabeli Fontana, Karolina Kurkova, Liya Kebede, Hana Soukupova, Gemma Ward, and Karen Elson. Bündchen appeared on the covers of W, Allure, GQ, Forbes, Marie Claire, Time, Vanity Fair, Esquire, and in the Pirelli Calendar. Bündchen co-starred with Queen Latifah and Jimmy Fallon in the 2004 remake of Taxi, and Bündchen played Serena in The Devil Wears Prada two years later. In 2007, Mario Testino photographed Bündchen for the cover of Vanity Fair's style issue. The following year, she appeared on the controversial cover of Vogue with NBA player LeBron James. The cover was criticized for perpetuating racial stereotypes after James bared his teeth in a perceived gorilla-type pose.

Forbes listed Bündchen as No. 53 on their 2007 list of the most powerful celebrities. In 2010, her flip-flop line for Ipanema sold more than 250 million pairs for an estimated $197 million. In May 2007, Bündchen ended her contract with Victoria's Secret. In her memoir, Lessons: My Path to a Meaningful Life, Bündchen said that she left Victoria's Secret because she was uncomfortable being photographed in lingerie. In August 2008, the New York Daily News named Bündchen as one of the most powerful people in the fashion world.

=== 2009–2011: Continued success ===
The Independent referred to Bündchen the biggest star in fashion history in May 2009. In April 2010, she appeared on the cover of American Vogue for the 11th time. Bündchen closed Balenciaga's 2010 show in a surprise appearance. She was ranked No. 95 in FHM magazine's 100 Sexiest Women in the World 2011. In 2007, Bündchen was named by Forbes as the World's Richest Supermodel. On 11 April 2008, a black-and-white photo of Bündchen shot by Irving Penn was auctioned for $193,000.

By 2010, Bündchen had appeared on two Vogue Shape issue covers, more than any other celebrity or model. She ranked No. 45 in the 2011 FHM Australia list of 100 Sexiest Women in the World. In 2011, Men's Health named Bündchen as No. 25 of the 100 Hottest Women of All Time. She closed the 2011 Givenchy spring-summer fashion show in a surprise appearance during Paris Fashion Week. That year, Bündchen launched eco-friendly Sejaa Pure Skincare, a skin care product line using all-natural ingredients.

Bündchen appeared on eight Vogue covers in 2011, more than any other model or celebrity that year. Her July Vogue Brasil 2011 cover that was shot in the Amazon sold 70,743 copies, making it the magazine's highest-selling issue. In early 2011, Procter & Gamble's Pantene shampoo sales increased 40 percent in Latin America after Bündchen started representing the product.

=== 2012–present: Modeling campaigns and music endeavors ===
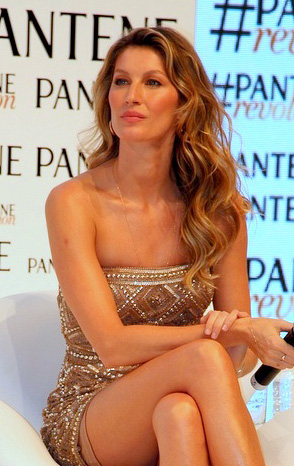
Bündchenat the Pantene Revolution launch event in São Paulo, Brazil in 2015

In spring 2012, Bündchen was featured in three spring campaigns, Versace, Givenchy, and Salvatore Ferragamo. She became the face of Banco do Brasil's first global ad campaign in 2012. In April 2012, Time listed Bündchen on its All-Time 100 Fashion Icons list, which highlighted the most influential fashion icons since 1923. Vogue included Bündchen in its spotlight of the 10 women who had most appeared on its covers to honor the magazine's 120th anniversary in August 2012.

Bündchen made 5,600 appearances in commercials in Brazil in 2012. She replaced Kate Moss as the face of David Yurman in August 2012. Bündchen was photographed by Peter Lindbergh for the fall 2012 campaign. By 2012, she had appeared on 120 Vogue covers. Bündchen holds the record for appearing on the most Vogue Brasil covers.

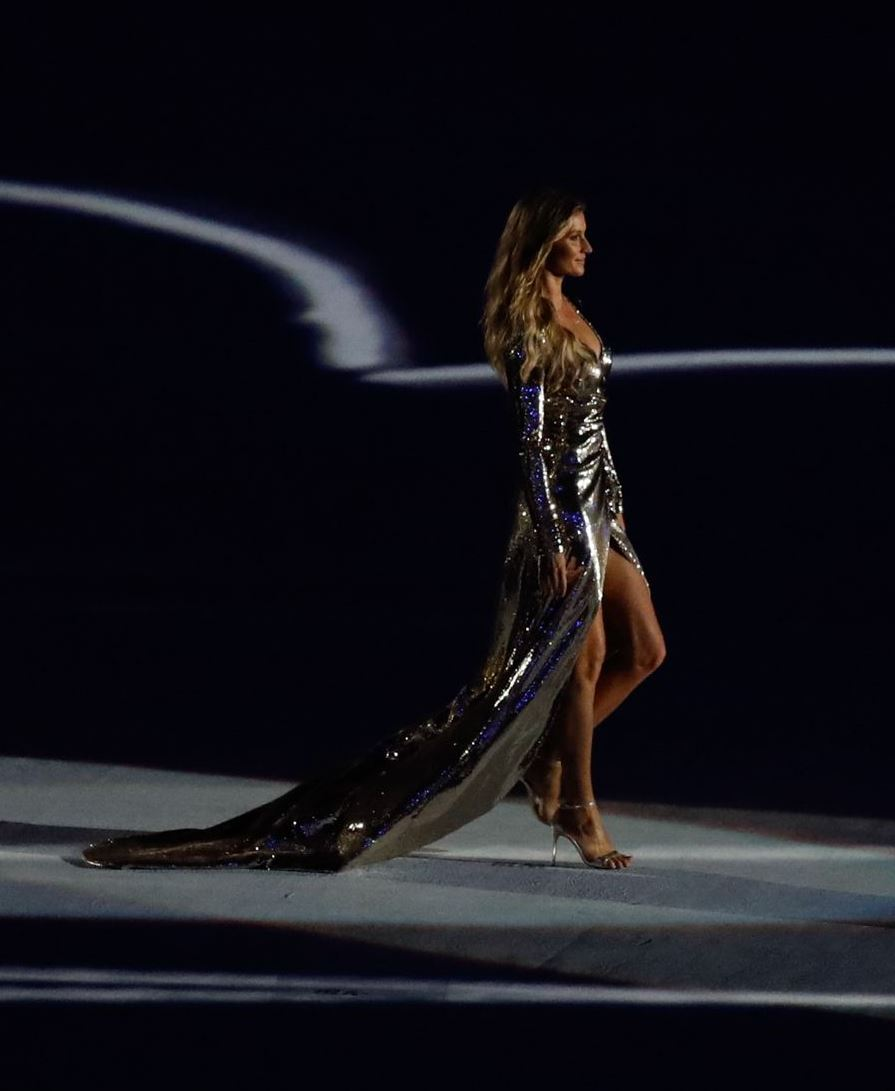
Bündchen at the opening ceremony of the 2016 Summer Olympics in Rio de Janeiro

In February 2013, Bündchen became the face of Chanel's make-up line, Les Beiges. The campaign was photographed by Mario Testino. For Louis Vuitton's spring/summer 2014 campaign, Marc Jacobs chose Bündchen, Catherine Deneuve, Sofia Coppola, Fan Bingbing, Caroline de Maigret and Edie Campbell as his muses. In December 2013, Bündchen became Pantene's ambassador, a deal worth $4 million per year.

Bündchen released a cover of the Kinks "All Day and All of the Night" as a contribution to H&M's 2013 charity campaign. She contributed to H&M's 2014 charity campaign by teaming with French music producer and DJ Bob Sinclar to record a cover of Blondie's 1979 classic "Heart of Glass", on which Bündchen was credited as Gisele. The single charted in France, Germany, Spain, Austria and Belgium.

In May 2014, Bündchen was chosen as the spokeswoman for Chanel No. 5. Within the first quarter of 2014, Bündchen appeared on 17 international editions of Elle, including the Brazilian, German, Italian, Canadian, Japanese and Chinese editions. Under Armour signed her to a multiyear deal in September 2014. In 2014 and 2015, Bündchen appeared in more television commercial spots than any other Brazilian celebrity in the course of one year in Brazil.

Bündchen was featured in the 2015 Guinness World Record book as the model who earned the most money from June 2014 to June 2015. Her $700 Taschen book released in celebration of her 20th year career sold out in one day. By 2015, Bündchen appeared in more than 550 advertising campaigns, 2000 magazine covers, 3500 magazine editorials and 800 fashion shows.

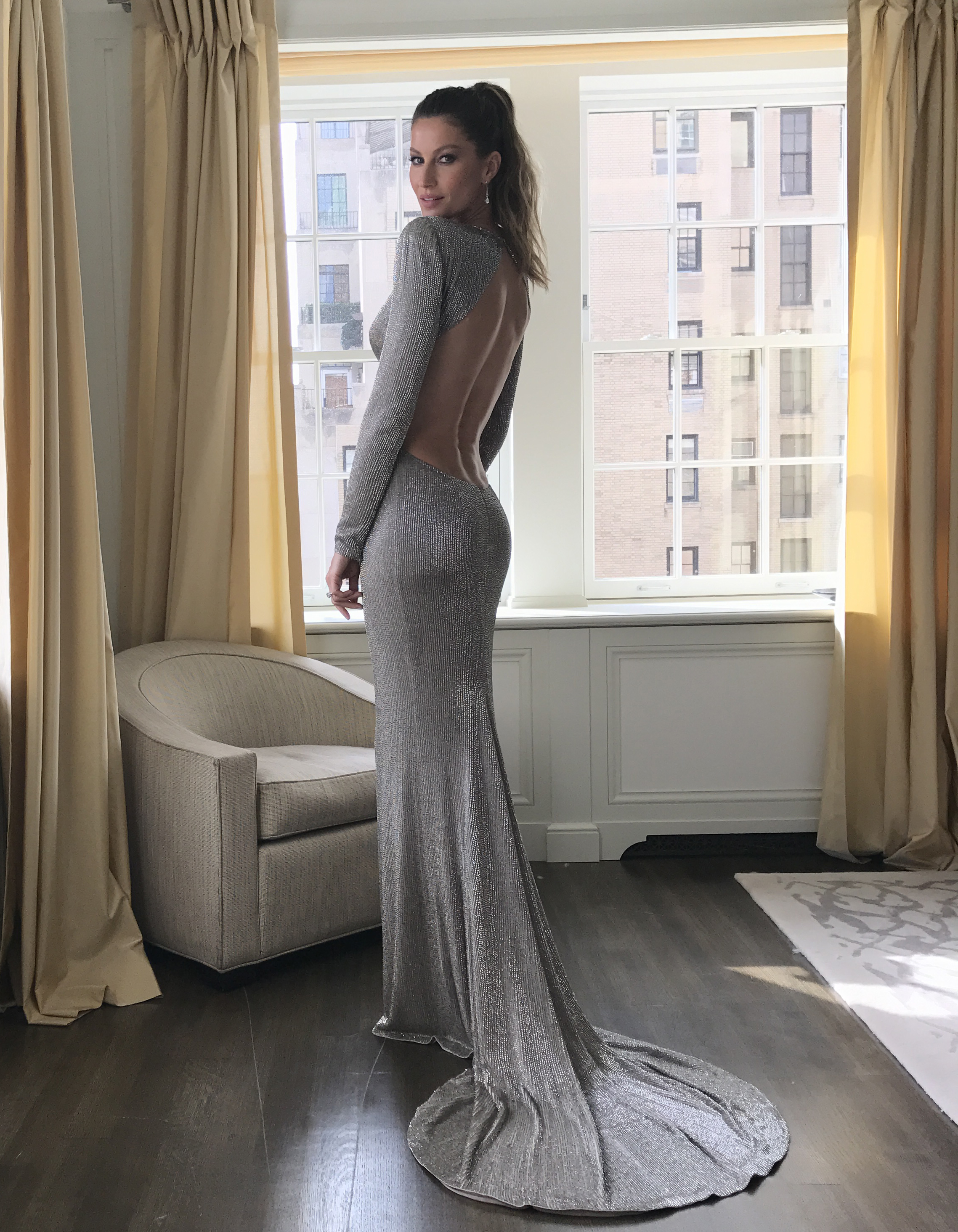
Bündchen getting ready for the Met Gala, 2017

Bündchen appeared at the Maracanã Stadium at the opening ceremony of the Summer Olympics in Rio de Janeiro on 5 August 2016.

Forbes ranked Bündchen No. 61 on its Most Powerful Celebrities list in 2012. Forbes ranked her fourth on the World's Most Powerful Latino Celebrity list in May 2012. In 2013, Bündchen ranked No. 5 on the Forbes 10 Most Powerful Businesswomen in Brazil.

In 2013, Bündchen's Ipanema sandals sold about 25 million pairs annually and accounted for more than 60 percent of shoe manufacturer Grendene's annual exports of about $250 million.

In 2014, Bündchen signed a contract with Under Armour, which is reportedly on par with the endorsement compensations of professional athletes and exceeds her former Victoria's Secret contract. Two years later, Under Armour's CEO Kevin Plank said sales for the company's women's brand had increased because of its association with Bündchen.

In 2018, Bündchen released her book called Lessons: My Path to a Meaningful Life, which was a New York Times bestseller and was the best selling book for over six months in the non-fiction category in Brazil. The proceeds from her book went to support social and environmental causes.

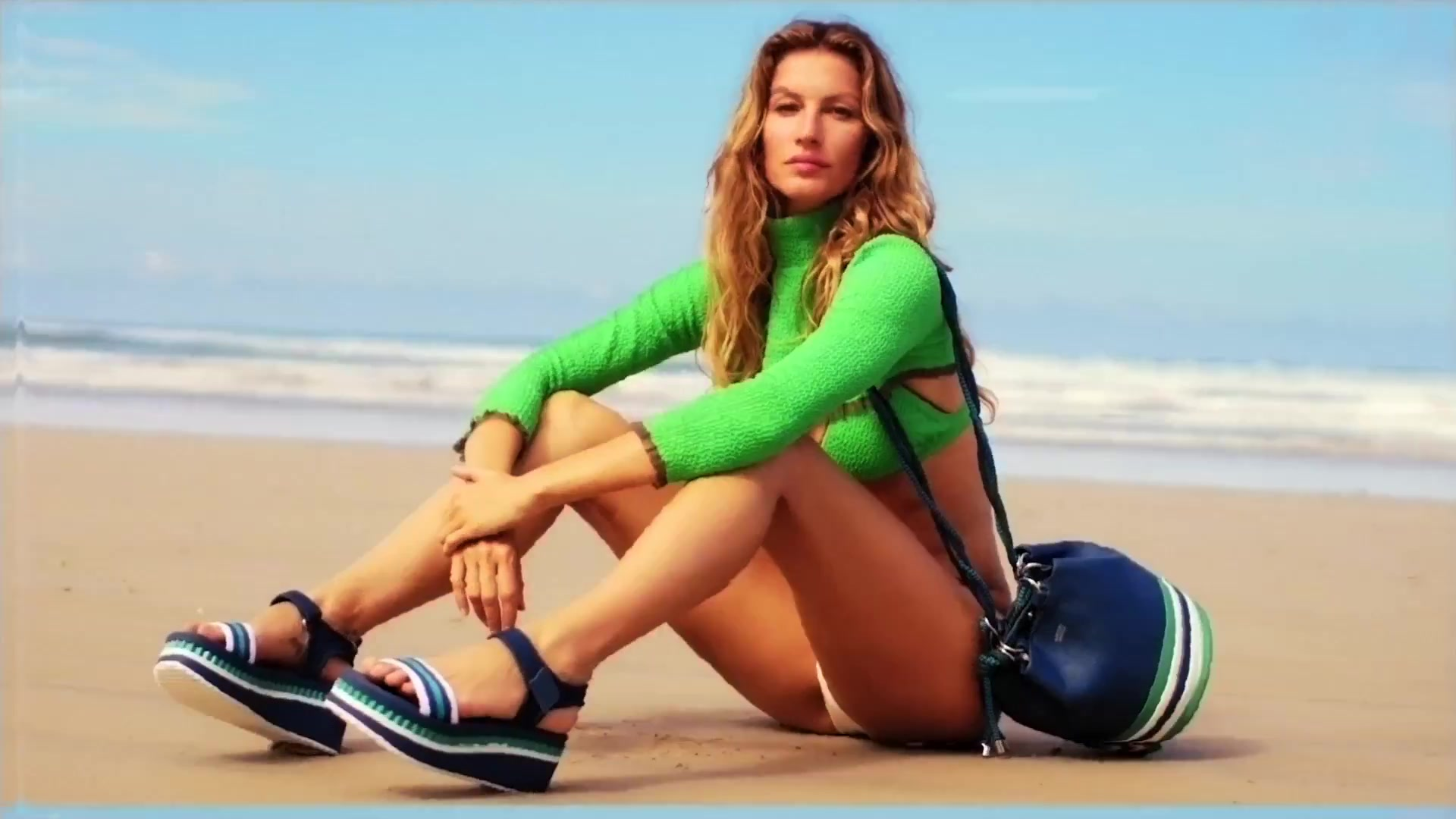
Bündchen in 2019

In February 2021, it was reported that Bündchen was leaving IMG Models after 22 years and that her twin sister Patricia would be taking over as her manager.

In 2021, Bündchen, among other high-profile athletes and celebrities (including ex-husband Tom Brady), was a paid spokesperson for FTX, a cryptocurrency exchange. In November 2022, FTX filed for bankruptcy, wiping out billions of dollars in customer funds as well as Bündchen's personal stake in the company. She, alongside other spokespeople, is currently being sued for promoting unregistered securities through a class-action lawsuit. In February 2022, the U.S. 11th Circuit Court of Appeals ruled in a lawsuit against Bitconnect that the Securities Act of 1933 extends to targeted solicitation using social media.

In 2023, Bündchen reunited with Victoria's Secret after 17 years, for their Icons campaign featuring fellow former Angels and brand veterans as well as recent supermodels including Naomi Campbell, Adriana Lima, Candice Swanepoel, Emily Ratajkowski, Paloma Elsesser, Jill Kortleve, and Adut Akech.

== Public image and impact ==
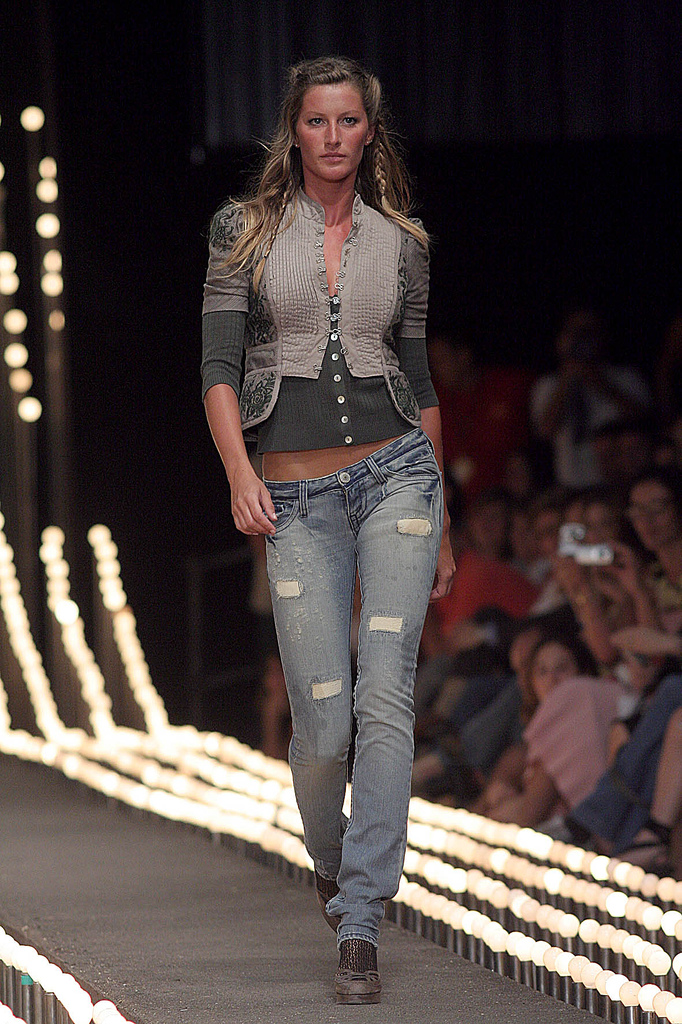
Bündchen is credited with helping transition the fashion industry from 1990s grunge aesthetics to a commercially dominant supermodel era

In September 2000, Newsweek reported on a survey conducted by Brazilian magazine Capricho, where 86 percent of Brazilian teenagers said they wanted to become fashion models. Capricho attributed the interest in modeling to Bündchen.

By 2014, Bündchen was listed by Forbes as the 89th most powerful woman in the world. Forbes Brasil listed her as the No. 2 biggest Brazilian celebrity of 2015 based on media presence and influence in Brazil.

In a 2006 Elle survey, more than 50 percent of American stylists asked gave Bündchen the title of the best hair in Hollywood. A February 2008 survey of more than 20,000 plastic surgeons in 84 countries revealed that she was the celebrity most mentioned for patients having work done on their abdomens and hair, and the second-most mentioned celebrity in the breasts category.

Bündchen was second on Vanity Fair's World's Most Beautiful poll in 2009. In January 2011, her body was the most desired female body on the 14th Annual Famed Hottest Looks survey. In 2011, Bündchen was one of three women to make AskMen.com's annual "Most Desirable Women" list every year for 10 consecutive years.

Bündchen is ranked No. 4 on Forbes Brasil's list of the 100 most influential Brazilian celebrities. In May 2014, she was ranked No. 89 on Forbes' 100 Most Powerful Women in the world, the only model on the list. In November 2014, Forbes Brasil ranked Bündchen fifth of the 25 biggest celebrities in Brazil, moving her up to second in 2015.

Vogue Italia called Bündchen the "King Midas of fashion" in February 2012, saying companies that invest in her reap the awards of her representation. An Esprit public awareness campaign featuring Bündchen helped raise consumer awareness 9 percent in Germany and 19 percent in China.

In 2016, Bündchen participated in The Beginning of Life, a documentary about "the crucial role that the early years of children's lives play in determining their futures successes".

== Philanthropy ==
Since the 2000s, Bündchen's main focus has been social and environmental causes. She has also supported the Breast Cancer Campaign to educate women on how to perform a breast self-exam.

=== Charitable activities ===
Bündchen donated $150,000 to Brazil's Zero Hunger program. She designed a limited necklace edition for Harper's Bazaar, crafted by jewelers Gumuchian Fils, which were sold to raise money for St. Jude Children's Research Hospital.

Bündchen became the face of American Express's Product Red-affiliated card in 2006. A portion of earnings from the credit card are donated to HIV/AIDS victims in Africa. That same year, she took part in the I am African fundraising campaign to make AIDS treatment accessible to all of Africa. In 2009, Bündchen appeared on 30 covers of the international issues of Elle wearing Product Red clothing and posing with products from companies that support its mission.

In 2008, Bündchen auctioned a collection of diamonds to benefit the Diamond Empowerment Fund, a nonprofit organization to education initiatives in countries where diamonds are a natural resource. The collection featured the Ponahalo Diamonds which were valued at $2 million to $4 million, a 6-carat diamond ring worth $120,000–$150,000 and a 3.35-carat Sabbadini diamond ring worth $15,000–$20,000. In 2010, Bündchen donated $1.5 million to the Red Cross to aid the relief effort in Haiti after seeing the devastation done by the earthquake. The donation put Bündchen tied for 14th on The Giving Back Fund's list of 30 celebrities who made the largest donations to charity in 2011.

In 2010, together with former president Bill Clinton, Bündchen joined the event that partnered Pantene and the Children's Safe Drinking Water Program to provide clean water to people in need. Bündchen and Indonesian singer-songwriter Anggun announced the kick-off of the Healthy Hair for Healthy Water program at P&G's reception that was held in conjunction with the 2010 Clinton Global Initiative in New York City. Bündchen also attended the Brazil Foundation's 8th Annual Gala to raise funds for fighting challenges faced by poor communities in Brazil. Bündchen created an exclusive design for SIGG water bottles, with proceeds going to WaterCan NGO, a humanitarian organization in Canada that provides the poorest people in the world access to clean water, toilets and information on hygiene.

In 2020, Bündchen formed the Luz Alliance fund in partnership with the Brazil Foundation with a donation of 1,000,000 reals. The fund supports the purchase of hygiene kits, food and financial assistance to families in Brazil through eight different charitable organizations and emergency-response efforts to offset the impact of the COVID-19 pandemic.

Bündchen, along with Tom Brady, partnered with Wheels Up to donate 10 million meals to Feeding America for their "Meals Up" initiative and helped fund thousands of meals for Feeding Tampa Bay and The Greater Boston Food Bank to alleviate food insecurity. She also partnered with the "All in Challenge" by donating an experience with her at a photo shoot in New York, with all proceeds going to Feeding America, Meals on Wheels, World Central Kitchen and No Kid Hungry.

=== Environmental work ===
In 2004, after visiting an Amerindian tribe at the Xingu region in Brazil and seeing firsthand the problems those communities were facing due to water pollution and deforestation, Bündchen decided she had to do something to help bring attention to social and environmental issues. She advocated for the cause and through the years she has supported different projects, especially forest and water related projects in the Amazon rainforest and Atlantic Forest.

Bündchen returned to her hometown of Horizontina in 2008, and launched Projeto Água Limpa (Clean Water Project) with her family, which implements sustainable environmental management and promotes the recovery of riparian vegetation and the micro basins of the region. More than one million trees were planted in Bündchen's name following her 2008 American Photo cover to promote Forests of the Future, a project to assist in the reforestation of the Brazilian Atlantic Forest.

In May 2009, Bündchen co-hosted the annual gala of the Rainforest Alliance to honor leaders in sustainability. In May 2011, she received the Global Environmental Citizen Award in recognition of her eco-efforts. In November 2011, Bündchen was awarded Greenest Celebrity at the 2011 International Green awards at the Natural History Museum, London.

Bündchen donates proceeds from the sales from her Ipanema sandals to a different charity each year. Starting in 2006, Bündchen dedicated a percentage of the sales of her line of sandals to environmental projects including "Y Ikatu Xingu", meaning "Save the Good Water of Xingu", the project aimed to recover and protect springs and headwaters of the Xingu River in Brazil. In 2007, Bündchen supported World Wildlife Fund project "Nascentes do Brasil" and "De olho nos manaciais" from ISA. The following year, the project supported was "Florestas do futuro" from SOS Mata Atlantica, a reforestation program for recovery of native species, which contributes to water conservation and biodiversity. A forest was named after her, the Gisele Bündchen Forest, where more than 25,000 seedlings of 100 different tree species were planted in her honor, which recovered more than 15 hectares of Atlantic Forest. In 2011, the donation went to the Socio-Environmental Institute. In 2009, Bündchen also helped the "Tamar Project", a research initiative and environmental protection of the five species of sea turtles along the Brazilian coast.

In 2019, Bündchen participated in challenges on World Environment Day to mobilize people to take action in helping protect the forest, the wildlife, the green economy, and to encourage people to reduce their food waste.

Bündchen and her former husband promote the Earth Hour global movement, a symbolic act promoted worldwide by the World Wildlife Foundation in which governments, companies, and people demonstrate concern for the environment, turning off their lights for 60 minutes.

In 2016, Bündchen joined the climate change documentary show Years of Living Dangerously as one of its celebrity correspondents.

In 2019, Bündchen executive produced a documentary entitled Kiss the Ground. The feature focuses on a group of activists, scientists, farmers, and politicians who band together in a global movement of "Regenerative Agriculture" to balance our climate, replenish our vast water supplies, and feed the world. The film features Bündchen alongside Woody Harrelson, Ian Somerhalder, Patricia Arquette, David Arquette, Tom Brady, and Jason Mraz. On her birthday in 2020, Bündchen launched the Viva a Vida initiative and donated funds to plant 40,000 trees along the Xingu and Araguaia River in Brazil.

=== Goodwill ambassador ===
Bündchen and her former husband, Tom Brady, served Thanksgiving dinner to more than 400 job trainees at Goodwill Industries International's headquarters in Roxbury, Massachusetts, in November 2008.

In September 2009, Bündchen was designated Goodwill Ambassador for the United Nations Environment Programme.

== Personal life ==
From 2000 to 2005, Bündchen was in a relationship with actor Leonardo DiCaprio. In 2004, Bündchen and DiCaprio made People's annual Most Beautiful Couples List. After experiencing a period of depression, Bündchen decided to end her relationship with DiCaprio after she felt their lifestyles no longer complemented, saying in her memoir Lessons, "I was becoming more and more aware of things that I'd chosen not to look at. Was I alone in wanting to do some serious soul-searching while he stayed the same? In the end, unfortunately, the answer was yes."

In December 2006, Bündchen began dating NFL quarterback Tom Brady, after a mutual friend, Ed Razek, then CMO of L Brands, introduced them on a blind date. They got married on 26 February 2009 in a small ceremony at St. Monica Catholic Church in Santa Monica, California. In April 2009, the couple had a second marriage ceremony, in Costa Rica. Bündchen and Brady have two children: a son (born 2009), and a daughter (born 2012). She was the stepmother of Brady's first son (born 2007) from a previous relationship with actress Bridget Moynahan. Bündchen and Brady are Catholics. On 28 October 2022, Bündchen and Brady finalized their divorce after 13 years of marriage.

Since June 2023, Bündchen has officially been in a relationship with Jiu-Jitsu instructor Joaquim Valente. The pair met in December 2021, when she started attending classes at Valente and his two brothers' Miami-based self-defense academy, and were first romantically linked when they were spotted on vacation together in Costa Rica in November 2022, a month after Bündchen and Brady finalized their divorce. In October 2024, it was announced that she was pregnant with their first child together. As of February 2025, Bündchen had given birth to her third child, her first with Valente. The child was later revealed to be a boy. Bündchen and Valente got married in Surfside, Florida on 3 December 2025.

Bündchen practices Transcendental Meditation. She and her family adhere to a primarily plant-based diet developed by their personal chef Allen Campbell. When Brady played for the New England Patriots, they lived in Brookline, Massachusetts and resided part-time in New York City. They later moved to Tampa, Florida, after Brady went to play for the Tampa Bay Buccaneers. In December 2020, they reportedly bought a home in Indian Creek, Florida. As of 2022, Bündchen owns three homes in South Florida.

In December 2021, Bündchen began training in Brazilian jiu-jitsu under the Valente brothers. After a little over two years of training, she was promoted to purple belt by them in December 2023.

=== Wealth ===
In August 2011, Bündchen ranked 60th on the Forbes list of the World's 100 Most Powerful Women. At age 31, she ranked third on The 20 Youngest Power Women of 2011 List. In 2011, Forbes named Bündchen and Brady as the World's Highest-Paid Celebrity couple. In August 2012, Bündchen was one of four people in the fashion industry and the only model to be ranked on the Forbes list of "The World's Most Powerful Women", at No. 83. She ranked eighth in the top 10 of the Forbes list of "Entertainment's Highest-Paid Women" in 2012.

Forbes ranked Bündchen as the world's top-earning model for the fifth consecutive time in May 2011. She disputed the number used by Forbes, telling Brazilian website MdeMulher that the inflated estimates have made her a subject of an audit by the Internal Revenue Service. In 2013, Bündchen ranked third on the 16 Most Successful Female Entrepreneurs list by Forbes. Forbes estimated her 2016 income at $30.5 million. Bündchen was the highest-paid model in the world from 2002 to 2017.

Bündchen has five sisters: Patricia (Pati), Graziela, Gabriela, Raquel, and Rafaela. Pati is her fraternal twin and serves as her manager. Gabriela has served as her personal attorney, Raquel as her website designer, and Rafaela as her accountant. Graziela, a judge, is the only sibling who is not involved in her career.

=== Spirituality ===
Bündchen believes in astrology, manifestation, and witchcraft. According to Tom Brady, she used these methods to successfully predict when he would win or lose the Super Bowl.

=== Pilot license ===
Gisele also earned her helicopter pilot license in 2009 while in Massachusetts. She had a fear of flying and overcame it with this method.

== Filmography ==
Film
Year	Title	Role	Notes
2004	Taxi	Vanessa	Nominated—Teen Choice Award for Choice Movie Breakout Performance – Female; Nominated—Teen Choice Award for Choice Movie Villain
2006	The Devil Wears Prada	Serena	
2008	Coração Vagabundo	Herself	Documentary
2013	Mademoiselle C.	Herself	Documentary
2018	Tom vs Time	Herself	Documentary
2020	Kiss The Ground	Herself	Documentary

Television
Year	Title	Role	Notes
1996	MTV al Dente	Host	Season 3
2006	The O.C.	Herself	Episode: "The Heavy Lifting"
2010–11	Gisele & the Green Team	Gisele	Voice; also executive producer

== Discography ==
=== Singles ===
List of singles, with selected chart positions and certifications
Title	Year	Peak chart positions								Album
Title	Year	AUT	BEL	FRA	GER	HUN	POL	SPA	US Dance	Album
"All Day and All of the Night"	2013	—	—	—	—	—	—	—	39	Non-album singles
"Heart of Glass" (with Bob Sinclar)	2014	63	66	31	73	31	31	27	—	Non-album singles
"—" denotes releases that did not chart or were not released in that territory.

=== Music videos ===
List of music videos, showing director
Title	Year	Director
"All Day and All of the Night"	2013	Amir Chamdin
"Heart of Glass"	2014	—N/a

== Awards and nominations ==
Year	Award	Nominated work	Category	Result	Ref.
1998	Phytoervas Fashion Award		Model of the Year	Won	
1999	Vh1/ Vogue Fashion Awards		Model of the Year	Won	
2005	Teen Choice Awards	Taxi	Choice Movie: Female Breakout Star	Nominated	
2005	Teen Choice Awards	Taxi	Choice Movie: Villain	Nominated	
2006	Premios Juventud		Fashion and Image: Supermodel	Nominated	
2007	Premios Juventud		Fashion and Image: Supermodel	Nominated	
2011	Harvard Medical School		Global Citizen Award	Won	
2011	International Green Awards		Best Green International Celebrity Award	Won	
2014	Fashion Awards		Model of the Year	Nominated	
2017	Green Carpet Fashion Award		Eco Laureate award	Nominated	
2024	Fashion Awards		2024 Lifetime Achievement – Industry's Vote	Won	

== See also ==
- Kate Moss
- Naomi Campbell
- List of Brazilians
- Supermodels
