= Aline Weber =

Brazilian model (born 1989)

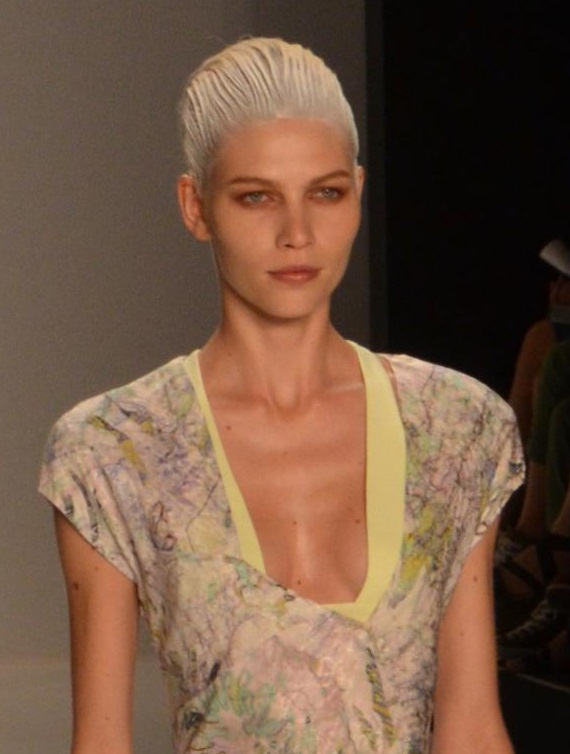
- Weber in the SS2012 Narciso Rodriguez fashion show
- Born: Aline Cleusa Weber; March 22, 1989 (age 37); Seara, Santa Catarina, Brazil
- Occupation: Model
- Years active: 2006–present
- Modeling information
- Height: 1.79 m (5 ft 10 in)
- Hair color: Blonde
- Eye color: Green
- Agency: Muse Management (New York); Next Model Management (London); Traffic Models (Barcelona); Scoop Models (Copenhagen); Modelwerk (Hamburg); Mega Model Brasil (São Paulo); Donna Models (Tokyo)

Aline Cleusa Weber (born March 22, 1989) is a Brazilian model.

== Early and personal life ==
Weber was born in Seara, Santa Catarina. She is of German descent and her ancestry in Brazil spans over a century. Weber was discovered when a photographer took pictures of her and sent them to agencies in São Paulo.

She became engaged to Pigma Amary, a Xingu nursing technician, following a trip to the Xingu Indigenous Park in the region of Mato Grosso. In 2021, they broke off their engagement and separated. In 2020, Weber participated in a campaign to help raise funds to assist indigenous communities in combating the COVID-19 pandemic.

== Career ==
Weber's debut on the international fashion scene was at the Spring 2006 New York Fashion Week shows. She walked for Tommy Hilfiger and Jenni Kayne. She also walked in Paris on her first season. Her print career started in Brazil. She worked for Brazilian magazines like their editions of Vogue and Marie Claire. In her first big season, she opened shows for Shiatzy Chen, Daks, Balenciaga, and Requiem. She also walked for Calvin Klein, Marc Jacobs, and Proenza Schouler.

Weber has walked the international runways many times, and for fashion houses like Balenciaga, Narciso Rodriguez, and Calvin Klein.

Magazine work has also put Weber on the map, appearing in magazines like Vogue, Harper's Bazaar, i-D and Maxim.

Weber's face has been used as the face of many campaigns, like D&G, M for Missoni, H & M Divided, Moschino Cheap and Chic and Jimmy Choo.

Weber appeared in Tom Ford's film A Single Man playing the role of a student named Lois.
