= Kate Dillon Levin =

American model, activist and actress

- Born: Kate Dillon; March 2, 1974 (age 52); Washington, D.C., U.S.
- Occupations: Model, non-profit corporate partnerships for Code REDD
- Spouse: Gabe Levin (m. 2008; div. 2014)
- Modeling information
- Height: 5 ft 11 in (1.80 m)
- Hair color: Brown
- Eye color: Blue
- Agency: Ford Models

Kate Dillon Levin (born March 2, 1974) is an American model and activist. She appeared in multiple editorials in fashion magazines, appeared in cosmetics, plus-size, and designer campaigns. She also worked with top photographers on campaigns and in editorials and appeared in many mass media outlets. Levin was the first plus-size model to appear in U.S. Vogue and was the first plus-size model to appear in a Gucci campaign. Dillon has also been involved with many non-profit organizations, and is an advocate for eating disorder awareness and treatment, sustainability, global poverty reduction, and social justice. She received her bachelor's degree in political science and international studies from University of St. Thomas and master's degree in international development from Harvard University's John F. Kennedy School of Government.

== Early life ==
Kate Dillon was born to Tom Dillon, a scientist, and Carol Dillon, a school teacher, near Washington, D.C., on March 2, 1974. She has an older brother named Dan. Dillon's family moved to San Diego, California, when she was 10. Dillon was teased by peers in adolescence because of her size. A documentary that Dillon watched at age 12 influenced her to lose an unhealthy amount of weight and triggered an eating disorder which lasted seven years. Dillon graduated from La Jolla Country Day School and was accepted in the University of California, Berkeley. After graduating high school, Dillon decided to model full-time instead of attending college.

== Modeling ==
Dillon was discovered by a San Diego photographer at 16 while sitting in a cafe. She modeled in Los Angeles while finishing high school. Dillon placed third in the 1991 Elite Look of the Year currently (Elite Model Look) contest and won a 75,000 dollar contract with Elite Model Management. In her early years of modeling, she worked with photographers such as Richard Avedon and Peter Lindbergh and appeared in campaigns for Bergdorf Goodman, Chanel, Dior, L'Oreal, and Missoni. Dillon was on the cover of Mademoiselle in November 1992. She also appeared in editorials for many magazines including U.S. Elle, Marie Claire and French Glamour in 1993. Dillon also walked for designers including Alberta Ferretti, Emporio Armani, Fendi, and Salvatore Ferragamo in the Autumn/Winter 1993 season. She also walked for Dior in 1993. She left fashion modeling in 1993 to recover from her eating disorder and find a new career path.

In 1995, Dillon returned to New York City to study elementary education. A friend advised Dillon to try plus-size modeling while in New York. Dillon applied to Wilhelmina Models, and was signed immediately. Dillon became the face of Elisabeth by Liz Claiborne in 1996, appearing on a Times Square billboard. She also appeared in a nationwide advertising campaign for Playtex that year. Glamour featured Dillon in an editorial "The Comeback Kid" in November 1996, which was the second appearance of a plus-size model in the magazine. MODE began publishing in Spring 1997, and Dillon appeared in an editorial in its first issue. Dillon appeared on several covers of MODE and in many editorials. She was profiled and often mentioned by name in her appearances in the magazine. Dillon also began modeling for Lane Bryant and appeared in many advertising campaigns for the brand.

She became a Lane Bryant Venezia Jeans V Girl in 1998, along with Mia Tyler, Sophie Dahl, basketball player Kym Hampton, and former MTV news reporter Abbie Kearse. Dillon walked in Lane Bryant's first runway show in 1998 and appeared in other runway shows for the brand until Lane Bryant discontinued the shows in 2003. Dillon was named Model of the Year by Mode magazine in 1998.

Richard Avedon photographed her for an advertising campaign for Avenue in 1999, where she appeared as different types of women, including Aphrodite. Dillon became the first plus-size model Avedon photographed. Dillon appeared in Gucci's Spring 2000 campaign, becoming one of the first plus-size models to appear in a mainstream fashion ad. In 2000, Dillon became the second plus-size model named to People's Most Beautiful People list. Dillon appeared in the campaign for Isabella Rossellini's Manifesto perfume, becoming one of only a few plus-size models to appear in a cosmetics campaign.

In November 2001, Dillon appeared in a Vogue Paris editorial photographed by David Armstrong and styled by Carine Roitfeld. In April 2002, Dillon appeared in an editorial photographed by Helmut Newton in US Vogue's first Shape Issue, becoming the first plus-size model to appear in a US Vogue editorial.

Dillon was a featured guest during season 3 of the US network show America's Next Top Model, talking to contestants about body image and self-esteem. In 2004, Dillon appeared in a campaign for Nine West. Dillon was the face of Marina Rinaldi campaigns from Spring/Summer 2004 to Spring/Summer 2008. She also appeared in the Spring/Summer 2009 campaign. Her most recent Marina Rinaldi campaign was Fall/Winter 2011 campaign with Crystal Renn.

Dillon walked in Elena Miro's first runway show in Milan Fashion Week(Elena Miro was the first plus-size brand to present at Milan Fashion Week) and appeared in many other runway shows for the brand. In February 2006, Dillon appeared in an editorial for French Vogue photographed by Mario Testino and styled by Carine Roitfeld. She appeared in editorials for French Elle and Jane in 2007.

Glamour Magazine featured Dillon along with plus-size models Amy Lemons, Anansa Sims, Ashley Graham, Crystal Renn, Jennie Runk, and Lizzie Miller in a nude photo referencing Herb Ritts' famous photo of 90's supermodels in 2009. She appeared in US Vogue for a second time in the April 2010 Shape Issue, photographed by Patrick Demarchelier, and interviewed by Sally Singer. Dillon became the spokesmodel for Suki, an eco-friendly cosmetics line in 2010. In 2011, Dillon appeared on the cover of Organice Your Life along with her son Lucas.

== Sustainability and fair-trade ==
Dillon wrote about eco-friendly lifestyle tips for an article in Glamour April 2010. She also wrote several blogs on glamour.com on eco-friendly fashion and lifestyle tips in 2010.

== Education ==
Dillon enrolled in the University of St. Thomas in Houston, Texas, at age 28, and graduated with a degree in political science. She then enrolled in Harvard University's John F. Kennedy School of Government, and received a Master's degree in Public Administration and International Development. Dillon co-authored a prize-winning thesis and received a Dean's award for teaching statistics.

== Humanitarian work ==
Dillon has founded several charities including ECHO Prosocial Gallery, Curves for Change and the Komera Project. Echo was founded in 1999, and provided arts programs for children in New York City. Dillon co-founded the Komera Project in 2008, which funds secondary education and mentoring to girls in Rwanda. Curves for Change was founded in 2010. The charity helps the Komera Project and other charities helping women through fundraising and increasing awareness of these non-profit organizations.

Dillon also works with charities such as Half the Sky, an organization sponsoring women's rights.

Dillon has been an advocate for eating disorder awareness, prevention and treatment by speaking about her eating disorder in public appearances and interviews. She appeared in NOVA's 2000 documentary, Dying to be Thin. Dillon became the Eating Disorder Coalition's first spokesperson in 2001. Dillon also has appeared on several panels related to eating disorders, including at Harvard Medical School in 2000.

Dillon is also involved with causes related to sustainability. She presented in a panel and walked in the sustainable fashion show at Ecochic, a sustainable fashion event sponsored by the United Nations and held in the UN's European headquarters in Geneva. Dillon also supports Global Green.

== Personal life ==
Dillon was married to real estate investor Gabe Levin from 2008 to 2014. Their son Lucas was born in 2010.

Dillon is an athlete. She has completed triathlons and enjoys yoga, hiking and bike riding. Levin also paints and plays the guitar. Her favorite TV shows are Mad Men and Top Chef.
