= Ashley Graham (model) =

American model (born 1987)

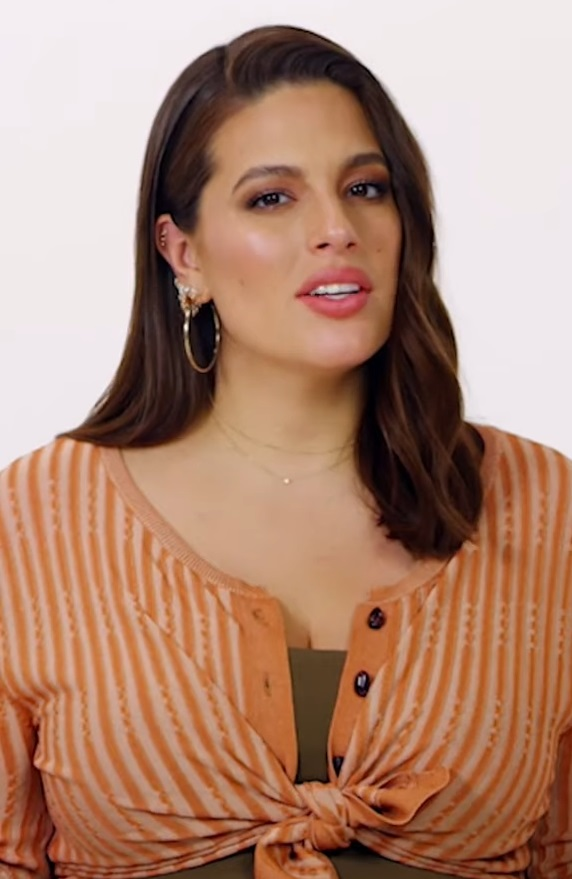
- Graham in 2024
- Born: October 30, 1987 (age 39)
- Occupations: Model; television presenter
- Years active: 2000–present
- Spouse: Justin Ervin (m. 2010)
- Children: 3
- Modeling information
- Height: 5 ft 10 in (1.78 m)
- Hair color: Brown
- Eye color: Brown
- Agency: IMG Models
- Website: ashleygraham.com

Ashley Graham Ervin (born October 30, 1987) is an American model and television presenter. She made her debut on the cover of the Sports Illustrated Swimsuit Issue in 2016. A year later, she published her first book, A New Model: What Confidence, Beauty, and Power Really Look Like, which contributes to her advocacy in the body positivity and inclusion movement.

== Early life ==
Graham was born on October 30, 1987, as the oldest of three sisters. When she was in middle school, she and her family moved to Lincoln, Nebraska. She attended Scott Middle School from 1999 to 2002 and Lincoln Southwest High School from 2002 to 2005. As a youth, she was diagnosed with ADHD and dyslexia.

In 2000, Graham was scouted by the I & I agency while shopping at Oak View Mall in Omaha, Nebraska.

== Career ==
Graham started modeling at the age of 12. In 2001, she signed with Wilhelmina Models after attending a model convention. In 2003, she switched to Ford Models.

During her early career, she appeared in YM magazine. In April 2007, she was profiled by Sally Singer of Vogue magazine. She appeared on the October 2009 issue of Glamour editorial "These Bodies are Beautiful at Every Size", along with plus-size models Kate Dillon Levin, Amy Lemons, Lizzie Miller, Crystal Renn, Jennie Runk, and Anansa Sims.

In 2010, Graham appeared in a controversial Lane Bryant TV commercial that was banned from prime time on ABC and Fox because it was considered too sexy. The commercial received over 800,000 views on YouTube and was covered by news outlets such as The Huffington Post and the New York Post. On May 31, 2010, she appeared on The Tonight Show with Jay Leno to address the controversy.

She has modeled for such international designers as Prabal Gurung, Michael Kors, Love Mag, Dolce and Gabbana, H&M, Tommy Hilfiger, Rag & Bone, and Christian Siriano.

In December 2010, Graham appeared in an editorial for Bust magazine. She appeared in several Levi's campaigns, including Curve ID SS 2011 with Sabina Karlsson, Ana Lisboa, Marquita Pring and McKenzie Raley, and Boyfriend Collection F/W 10 with Rachel Clark, Ana Lisboa, Anais Mali, Marquita Pring and Ashley Smith. Graham has appeared in several Marina Rinaldi campaigns: Spring/Summer 2012, Fall/Winter 2012 denim, and Fall/Winter 2012 sport. Other clients include Addition Elle, Bloomingdale's, Elomi lingerie, Evans, Hanes, Liz Claiborne Macy's, Nordstrom, Simply Be and Target. In December 2012, Graham was featured on two billboards in New York for Lane Bryant. At the end of that year, she was named the Full Figured Fashion Week's Model of the Year.

In 2013, Graham designed a lingerie line for Addition Elle, a Canadian plus-size clothing retailer. She also appeared on MTV's Made, as a coach for an aspiring plus-size model. She appeared on the May 2014 issue for the international Harper's Bazaar pre-fall collection and beauty editorial. She was the cover model on the June 2014 issue of Elle Quebec. In 2015, swimsuitsforall, a plus-size women's swimsuits retailer, featured Graham in an advertisement in Sports Illustrated's annual Swimsuit Issue. The ad was part of swimsuitsforall's #CurvesInBikinis campaign. Graham was one of the first plus-size models to appear in the Swimsuit Issue. In 2016, she became the first plus-size model to appear on its cover.

Graham served as a backstage host for Miss USA 2016, Miss Universe 2016, Miss USA 2017, Miss Universe 2017, and Miss Universe 2018. In addition, she was a judge on America's Next Top Model on VH1.

In 2016, Graham appeared opposite Joe Jonas in DNCE's video for the song "Toothbrush". In 2017, she competed in an episode of Spike's Lip Sync Battle against Superior Donuts actor Jermaine Fowler. Graham won with performances of Shawn Mendes's "Treat You Better" and Shania Twain's "That Don't Impress Me Much".

In 2017, Graham released a book, A New Model: What Confidence, Beauty, and Power Really Look Like. In this memoir, she provides insight into her experiences as a model and as an advocate for body positivity, and shares her prospects for the evolution of body image in years to come. That year, Graham was also the focus of a nine-episode series on the Go90 digital network, The Ashley Graham Project.

Graham hosted the second season of American Beauty Star in 2019.

Ahead of International Women's Day, in February 2022, Graham and Joanna Griffiths released Big. Strong. Woman. at the Adweek Challenger Brands Summit, a film focused on combating female stereotypes and highlighting female strength.

In 2023, Graham hosted the Countdown to the Oscars red carpet presentation show before the 95th Academy Awards, alongside Vanessa Hudgens and Lilly Singh.

In March 2025, it was announced that Graham would make her Broadway debut as Roxie Hart in the musical Chicago from April 15 to May 25 of that year. In October 2025, Graham designed a clothing line exclusively available at JCPenney.

=== Body positivity ===
Graham is a proponent of the body positivity and the Health at Every Size movements. In 2016, she became the first size 16 model to be featured on the cover of the Sports Illustrated Swimsuit Issue. Glamour described Graham's cover as "bringing size acceptance into the mainstream". She appeared on the cover of Vogue in 2017, becoming the first plus-size model to appear in the magazine.

Graham gave a TED Talk advocating self-acceptance with regard to body image, which included her looking into a full-length mirror and having a friendly chat with her body parts making comments such as: "Back fat, I see you popping over my bra today. But that's all right. I'm gonna choose to love you."

Graham has been praised by women on Instagram for sharing photos showing her cellulite. In an interview with Vogue, she said, "I definitely think that my body has changed many peoples' lives. I've used my body as a tool to talk about taboo subjects, such as cellulite or being insecure about lower belly fat—and also [how to] talk life into your body and have an affirmation kind of conversation with yourself. And I know the lives that have been changed: young girls and even women my age who have written me and said, 'I never loved the skin that I was in until I heard your journey'." Graham has said she does not prefer the term "plus-size": "I think that when you use the word 'plus-size' you're putting all these women into a category: 'You don't eat well.' 'You don't work out.' 'You couldn't care less about your body.' 'You're insecure.' 'You have no confidence.' And that is none of this [pointing at her body]"... The fashion industry may persist to label me as 'plus-size,' but I like to think of it as 'my size."

== Personal life ==
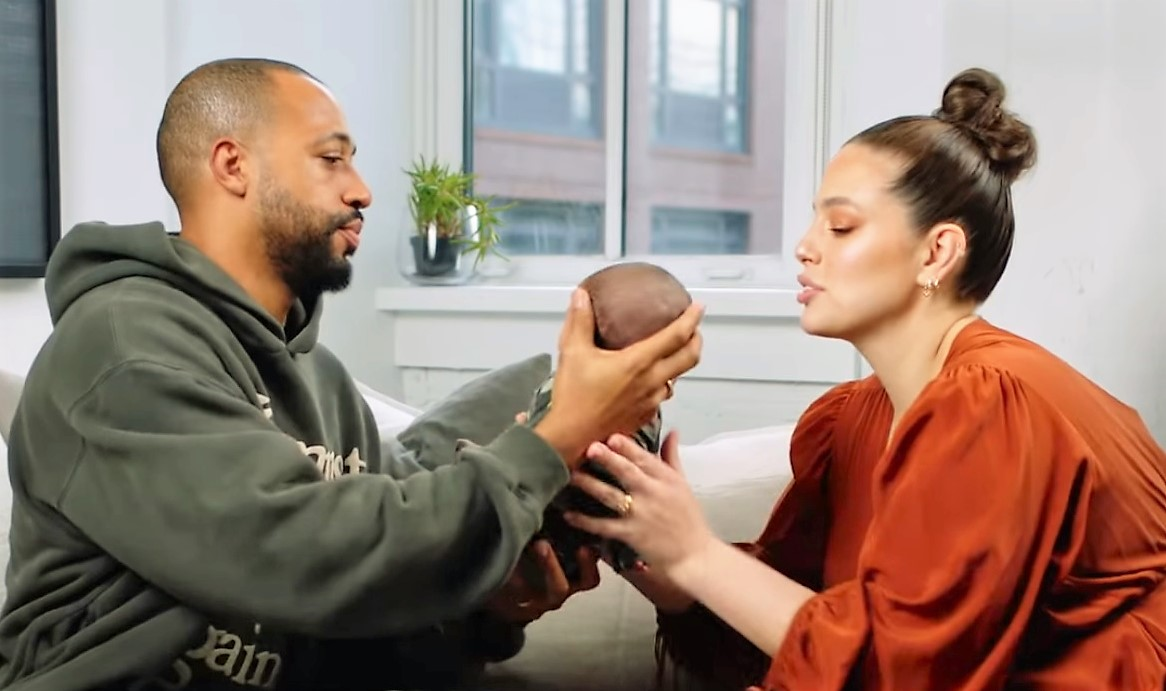
Justin Ervin, their son, and Graham in 2020

Graham has participated in missionary work in South Africa with the Themba Foundation.

She met her husband, Justin Ervin, a videographer, at church in 2009; they married the next year. In August 2019, Graham and Ervin announced that they were expecting their first child.

In a 2017 interview with CBS News, Graham admitted that her interracial relationship with Ervin, who is black, shocked her family:

I will never forget that feeling of just sitting there with Justin, thinking, "I'm so embarrassed that I had to bring him in to meet these people, these people who raised me and taught me how to live, and he's being treated so terribly". And he said to me, "Racism is never surprising, but it's always disappointing."

On January 18, 2020, Graham gave birth to a son. In July 2021, she announced they were expecting a second child, which turned out to be twin sons. In January 2022, Graham gave birth to the twins at home.

== Filmography ==
=== Film ===
Year	Title	Role	Notes
2026	The Devil Wears Prada 2	Herself	Cameo appearance and first film role

=== Television ===
Year	Title	Role	Notes
2017	What Would You Do?	Herself / guest	Season 13; episode 1
2017	The Ashley Graham Project	Herself	
2019	American Beauty Star	Herself / host	Also executive producer
2023	Barbie Dreamhouse Challenge	Herself / host	4 episodes

=== Music videos ===
Year	Title	Artist(s)	Role	Ref.
2016	"Toothbrush"	DNCE		
2018	"Girls Like You" (Original, Volume 2 and Vertical Video versions)	Maroon 5 featuring Cardi B	Herself (cameo)	
2023	"Cut"	Tori Kelly		
