= Aija Bārzdiņa =

Latvian fashion model

- Born: Aija Bārzdiņa; Riga, Latvia
- Occupation: Fashion model
- Modeling information
- Height: 1.78 m (5 ft 10 in)
- Hair color: Blond
- Eye color: Blue
- Agency: Wilhelmina Models

Aija Bārzdiņa (born in Riga, Latvia) is a Latvian plus-size model.

== Biography ==
Aija was first introduced to the fashion world in Riga, Latvia in 1992 when she attended Zandas Kransmanes Model School.

In 1999, the Italian photographer Beppe Lopetrone took her for the first time to Milan, Italy where her modeling career in high fashion as regular size began.

Between 1999 and 2003, she had been living and working mostly both in Milan, Italy and Miami, Florida.

Her modeling career had a change in 2004 when she moved back to Italy and decided to join the plus-size model career. Aija gained weight going from a size 8 to a size 12 (US).

She currently resides in Milan, Italy where she still works as professional plus-size model. She is attending a Chef School degree program and enjoys riding her motorbike.

== Plus Size career ==
Aija has developed contracts with many high-profile Italian plus-size clothing manufacturers such as Miroglio, Benetton, Gianfranco Ferré, Mariella Burani, Yamamay, Liu Jo, Sonia Fortuna, Mariagrazia Severi and has also appeared on the runway for Elena Miro (Miroglio) in Milan, Italy from 2004 till nowadays.

Aija is also notable for appearing in “Curvy Can”, the Italian Eating disorder 2010 awareness campaign where 6 plus-size models were nude pictured under the “We are not Fashion Victim” slogan.

== Agencies ==
- Wilhelmina Models (USA)
- Hughes Models (UK)
- G Models (Italy)
