= Amy Lemons =

American fashion model

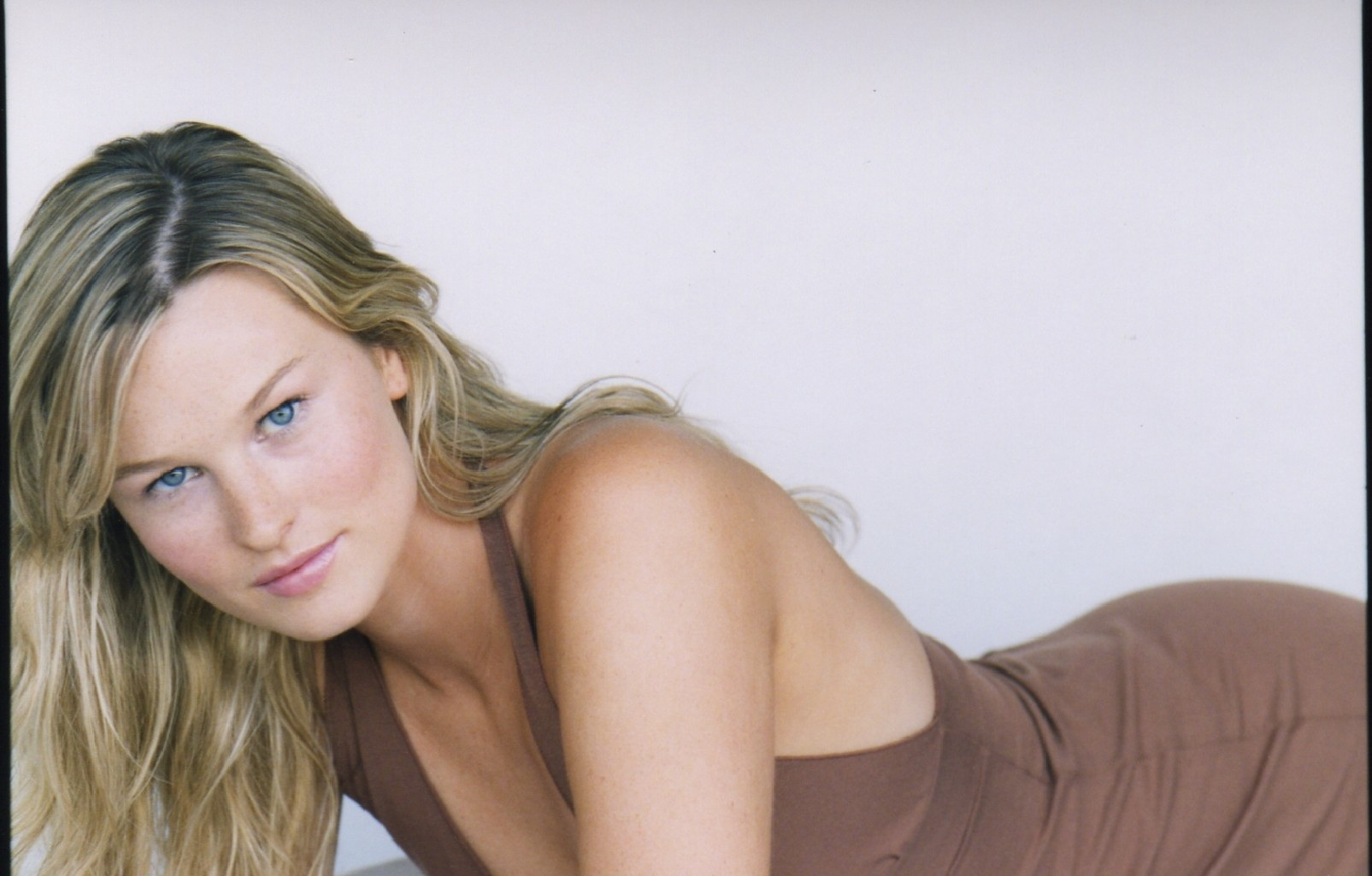
- Born: Richmond, Virginia, U.S.
- Occupation: Model
- Years active: 1995–present
- Parent: Donald W. Lemons
- Modeling information
- Height: 1.80 m (5 ft 11 in)
- Hair color: Blonde
- Eye color: Green/Blue

Amy Lemons is an American fashion model and model advocate. She rose to fame quickly by landing the cover of Italian Vogue at age 14. Her ascent in the modeling industry included shooting the covers of Vogue, Harpers Bazaar, Elle and Marie Claire. She also landed campaigns for Abercrombie and Fitch, Tommy Hilfiger, Calvin Klein, Jil Sander, and Louis Vuitton. After a brief hiatus to earn her college degree from UCLA, Amy came back to the modeling industry and began speaking out about the industry's "zero-sized standard" and healthy self-esteem for young women.

== Biography ==
Amy Lemons was born in Doswell, Virginia. Her father is Donald W. Lemons, Chief Justice of the Supreme Court of Virginia. Amy began her career as a fashion model at the age of 12 after being discovered in her dentist's office. At the age of 14, she landed the cover of Italian Vogue. In 2009, Amy Lemons graduated from UCLA with a B.A. in History.

== Career and projects ==
Lemons is an advocate for positive body image. In September 2009, Amy was featured in Glamour Magazine along with 6 other fashion models (Crystal Renn, Ashley Graham, Kate Dillon Levin, Anansa Sims, and Jennie Runk) who were larger than standard sample size.

In 2010, Amy appeared in New York Magazine as part of Sara Ziff's "Picture Me" documentary on the often hidden side of fashion modeling.

Amy spoke about the issue of positive body image on The Ellen DeGeneres Show. Amy Lemons is involved with the "Let's Talk About it Campaign" which is part of the NOW Foundation's Love Your Body Campaign. "For more than a decade, NOW Foundation's Love Your Body Campaign has been calling out the fashion, cosmetics and advertising industries for promoting unrealistic images of women. The campaign encourages women and girls to celebrate their bodies and reject the narrow beauty ideals endorsed in the media." Amy Lemons has appeared on VogueTV, did a segment for The Oprah Winfrey Show and was featured in Maxim Magazine.

== Clients ==
Lemons has worked with many top brands and publications including Abercrombie and Fitch, Calvin Klein, Elena Miro, Elle Magazine, Glamour Magazine, Louis Vuitton, Macy’s, Nordstrom, Ralph Lauren, Tommy Hilfiger, Valentino, and Versace.

== Filmography ==
- Johnny Benson's Adventures in the Blogosphere (2005)
- The Gymnast (2006)
