= Sir John (make-up artist) =

American make-up artist

- Born: Sir John Barnett; July 1, 1982 (age 44); Buffalo, New York, US
- Occupations: Make-up artist; executive; activist; influencer
- Years active: 2001–present
- Awards: Makeup Artist of the Year, InStyle (2016)
- Website: www.sirjohnofficial.com

Sir John Barnett (born July 1, 1982), known professionally as Sir John, is a make-up artist, activist, influencer, and executive. He is best known for being a creative collaborator and make-up artist of Beyoncé. Among those he has done make-up work for include Naomi Campbell, Serena Williams, Chrissy Teigen, Priyanka Chopra, Margot Robbie, Zendaya, Naomi Osaka, Mary J Blige, Iman, Celine Dion, Viola Davis, Erykah Badu, Joan Smalls, and Kat Graham. Sir John is a creative director for L'Oreal Paris USA and the Chief creative officer of CTZN Cosmetics.

== Early life ==
Sir John was born in Buffalo, New York. He took interest in art at early age—receiving formal training from the age of six. Sir John honed his skillset at the Buffalo Academy for Visual and Performing Arts (BAVPA). At the age of eighteen, he moved to Atlanta, Georgia, following his passion for art, to study art history, printmaking, and sculpture at American InterContinental University.

While in Atlanta, Sir John serendipitously discovered a love for make-up. His friend, a catalog model, invited him to accompany her to a photo shoot for an upcoming spread. The make-up artist for the shoot canceled at the last minute and the shoot photographer, recognizing that Sir John studied art, offered him the opportunity to do his friend's make-up. The following week, the photographer invited Sir John to work on another photo shoot, and soon introduced Sir John to some of his friends in the cosmetic industry; this led to his first full-time job at a local make-up counter for MAC Cosmetics. At the age of 19, Sir John was transferred to work at MAC's SoHo Bloomingdales location in New York City.

At the age of 23, he pivoted into visual merchandising and executed displays for Barneys New York, Henri Bendel, Bergdorf Goodman, and Gucci. Concurrently, he moonlighted as a make-up artist at the Riviera Gentlemen's Club in Astoria, Queens.

== Career ==
=== Pat McGrath and Charlotte Tilbury ===
In 2010, while on a lunch break, Sir John ran into his old friend Yadim Carranza—a make-up artist that he knew from his time at MAC and a lead assistant of British make-up artist Pat McGrath. This encounter led to an opportunity to work as a make-up artist under the wing of Pat McGrath—first in Bryant Park, New York City, and, shortly thereafter, during Milan Fashion Week. In Milan, Sir John served as a make-up artist at his first show ever, the Dolce & Gabbana fashion show. He also worked Prada's fashion show and, at Bulgari Hotel Milano, with his first celebrity client, Naomi Campbell.

Soon after working at Milan Fashion Week, Sir John began assisting British make-up artist Charlotte Tilbury. In September 2010, Tilbury introduced him to Beyoncé, at Tom Ford's first womenswear show during New York Fashion Week. At the Tom Ford show, Sir John made his debut as Beyoncé's make-up artist, at the same time that Beyoncé made her debut as a runway model. In 2012, Sir John signed an agreement with Beyoncé to become her make-up artist.

=== Beyoncé ===
As Beyoncé's make-up artist, Sir John designed dozens looks spanning her body of work, from music videos and magazine spreads, to the Super Bowl, world tours, and red carpet appearances.

==== Beyoncé Album ====
In 2013, Sir John created Beyoncé's looks for the Beyoncé (album). Her self-titled fifth studio album is a two-disc album that includes an audio disc (disc one) and a "visual album" (disc two), where all 18 tracks are accompanied by non-linear short films. Among other videos for the album, he created Beyoncé's looks for two videos that accompanied the two-part tracks "Haunted" and "Partition." He also did her make-up in "Pretty Hurts," "Drunk in Love," "Blow," "No Angel," "Formation," "Jealous," "Rocket," "Mine," "XO," "Flawless," "Superpower," "Heaven," "Blue," and "Grown Woman."

==== Super Bowl 50 Halftime Show ====
In 2013, Sir John designed Beyoncé's make-up for the Super Bowl 50 halftime show. Her make-up was lauded as an "insanely gorgeous coppery dream of a makeup look" by Cosmopolitan, "#flawless" by Glamour, and one of the "most memorable Super Bowl beauty moments" by Allure. During the Super Bowl 50 Halftime Show, Beyoncé announced her seventh concert tour, in support of her sixth studio album Lemonade, The Formation World Tour.

==== The Formation World Tour and Lemonade ====
External Media
- Sir John Discusses Beyonce's Makeup for Formation World Tour

Sir John conceived and fine tuned her look for 49 sold-out shows, spanning 16 countries. The palette for The Formation World Tour consisted of warmer tones—bronze and terracotta shades. In alignment with Beyonce's 2016 Elle US, UK, and France magazine covers, Sir John focused on skin glow and naturalness.

==== "Beychella" ====
In 2018, Sir John was responsible for Beyoncé's make-up during her performance at Coachella—dubbed "Beychella"—when she became the first black woman to headline the event. According to Sir John, he wanted Beyoncé to " look like a college girl on campus", a look that was inspired by the 1988 film School Daze.

==== 60th Annual Grammy Awards ====
That same year he partnered with Beyoncé to help create three looks for the pre-Grammy Roc Nation Brunch, 2018 Clive Davis Recording Academy Gala, and the 60th Annual Grammy Awards.

=== American Beauty Star ===
Sir John became an executive producer (alongside Adriana Lima, Norton Herrick, and Ross Elliot) and in-show mentor for an American competition reality television series on Lifetime, American Beauty Star. The series ran for two seasons—Sir John was a mentor during both seasons—and featured Adriana Lima, Ashley Graham, Christie Brinkley, Russell James, and Yu Tsai.

=== Executive leadership ===
In 2015, Sir John was named a creative director for L’Oréal Paris USA, making him the brand's first Black creative director in the United States. In 2022, he was tapped as Chief creative officer of CTZN Cosmetics.

== Make-up work ==
=== Print ===
Date	Subject(s)	Publication/Organization	Media	Editor/Stylist	Photographer	Hair Stylist	Source
July 2022	Beyoncé	British Vogue	Cover and Editorial	Edward Enninful	Rafael Pavarotti	Jawara	
June 2022	Naomi Osaka	Dazed Magazine	Cover and Editorial	Ai Kamoshita	Justin French	Marty Harper	
March 2022	Emma Chamberlain	Harper's Bazaar Singapore	Cover and Editorial	Martina Nilsson	Yu Tsai	Rob Talty	
October 2021	Cynthia Erivo	The Cut	Cover and Editorial	Jessica Willis	Amber Pinkerton	Coree Moreno	
March 2021	Chloe Bailey, Halle Bailey	Vogue	Editorial	Gabriella Karefa-Johnson	Julie Dash	Rachel Lee	
November 2020	Doja Cat	Narcisse Magazine	Cover	Olga Yanul	Greg Swales	Frederic Kebbabi	
October 2020	Gabrielle Union	Marie Claire	Cover	Thomas Christos Kikis	Djeneba Aduayom	Larry Sims	
May 2020	Megan Thee Stallion	Marie Claire	Cover	Memsor Kamarake	Micaiah Carter	Kellon Deryck	
February 2020	Zendaya, Storm Reid	Love Magazine	Cover and Editorial	Law Roach	Alasdair McLellan	Jawara	
January 2020	Beyoncé	Elle	Cover and Editorial	Karen Langley	Melina Matsoukas	Neal Farinah	
September 2018	Beyoncé	Vogue	Cover and Editorial	Tonne Goodman	Tyler Mitchell	–	
February 2018	Mary J. Blige	New York Magazine	Cover	Law Roach	René & Radka	Larry Sims	
July 2017	Ashley Graham	Glamour	Cover	Jillian Davison	Nathaniel Goldberg	Shon	
June 2017	Anais Mali, Jourdan Dunn	Glamour	Editorial	Jillian Davison	Victor Demarchelier	David von Cannon	
March 2017	Alécia Morais, Amilna Estevao	Elle U.S.	Editorial	Samira Nasr	Mark Seliger	Kevin Ryan	
December 2016	Aline Weber	Harper's Bazaar Kazakhstan	Cover and Editorial	Anna Katsanis	–	Michael Silva	
October 2016	Amanda Murphy	Elle U.S.	Editorial	Samira Nasr	Liz Collins	Kevin Ryan	
October 2016	Naomi Scott	Elle U.S.	Editorial	Samira Nasr	Liz Collins	Kevin Ryan	
August 2016	Pyper America Smith	Seventeen Magazine	Editorial	James Worthington Demolet	–	Thanos Samaras	
July 2016	Serena Williams	Glamour	Cover	Jillian Davison	Norman Jean Roy	Ursula Stephen	
June 2016	Margot Robbie	Vogue	Cover	Tonne Goodman	Mert and Marcus	Shay Ashual	
May 2016	Katrin Thormann	Vogue Ukraine	Editorial	Olga Yanul	An Le	Joey George	
May 2016	Beyoncé	Elle U.S.	Cover and Editorial	Samira Nasr	Paola Kudacki	Kim Kimble	
May 2016	Beyoncé	Elle UK	Cover	–	Paola Kudacki	–	
April 2016	Beyoncé	Elle France	Cover	–	Paola Kudacki	–	
April 2016	Viktoriya Sasonkina	Marie Claire Russia	Cover and Editorial	Anna Rykova	Jack Waterlot	Olivier Lebrun	
March 2016	Georgia Fowler	Marie Claire Russia	Cover and Editorial	Anna Rykova	Jack Waterlot	Olivier Lebrun	
February 2016	Anastasia Ivanova	Elle Mexico	Cover and Editorial	–	Santiago Ruisenor	Cash Lawless	
February 2016	Emma Stern Nielsen	Marie Claire Russia	Cover and Editorial	Anna Rykova	–	Olivier Lebrun	
January 2016	Anja Cihoric	Elle Mexico	Cover and Editorial	–	Santiago Ruisenor	Cash Lawless	
October 2015	Beyoncé	Beat Magazine	Editorial	Karen Langley	Ryan McGinley	–	
September 2015	Joan Smalls	Vogue Mexico	Cover and Editorial	Sarah Gore Reeves	Russell James	Italo Gregorio	
September 2015	Beyoncé	Vogue	Editorial	Camilla Nickerson	Anton Corbijn	–	
August 2015	Joan Smalls	Sunday Style Australia	Editorial	–	Todd Barry	Jennifer Yepez	
June 2015	Iman	Vanity Fair Italia	Cover and Editorial	–	Markus & Koala	Chuckie Amos	
May 2015	Joan Smalls	Lucky Magazine	Cover and Editorial	Samantha Traina	Miguel Reveriego	Jennifer Yepez	
January 2015	Ilse De Boer	Vogue Ukraine	Cover and Editorial	Amy Mach	Jack Waterlot	Jon Reyman	
December 2015	Alena Blohm	The Coveteur	Editorial	Emma Cali	Adam Franzino	Sasha Nesterchuk	
October 2014	Joan Smalls	Self Magazine	Cover and Editorial	Melissa Ventosa Martin	Patrick Demarchelier	Jennifer Yepez	
May 2014	Beyoncé	Time Magazine	Cover and Editorial	–	Paola Kudacki	–	
October 2013	Naomi Campbell	Harper's Bazaar España	Cover and Editorial	Juan Cebrian	Xevi Muntane	–	

== Awards ==
In 2016, Sir John was crowned InStyle Makeup Artist of the Year.

== Personal life ==
Sir John currently resides in Hancock Park, Los Angeles, California.
