= Jade Runk =

American plus-size model (born 1988)

- Born: November 2, 1988 (age 37); Georgia, United States
- Occupation: Fashion model
- Modeling information
- Height: 1.77 m (5 ft 9 1/2 in)
- Hair color: Light Brown
- Eye color: Blue
- Agency: Jag Models, Ford Models, Mother Model Management (mother agency)

Jade Runk (born Jennifer Darci May-Corsini; November 2, 1988) is an American plus-size model. They (Note: Runk is transmasculine and non-binary and uses they and he pronouns.) are best known for appearing in H&M's Summer 2013 beachwear campaign, which was featured on the front page of H&M's United States website in late April 2013.

== Early life ==
Jade Runk was born in Georgia and later moved to Chesterfield, Missouri. Runk became a Girl Scout at age 5. As a teenager, they were involved with their high school drama program and worked as a Girl Scout leader. Their family rescued and fostered dogs. They volunteered for the cat adoption center for Open Door Animal Sanctuary at Petsmart in Chesterfield, Missouri.

Runk graduated from Parkway West High School in 2007. They graduated from Stephens College with a Bachelor of Fine Arts in creative writing in 2011.

== Career ==
Runk was discovered in 2003 at 14 in a PetSmart in Chesterfield, Missouri by Mary Clarke of Mother Model Management while they were volunteering for the cat adoption department. At the time, they were a size 8, in between straight size and plus-size modeling. The Clarkes told them they needed to either lose weight or gain weight to model. They chose to gain between 10 and 20 lb (4.5 and 9.1 kg) to a size 10–12 to become a plus-size model.

They have appeared on Good Morning America and was profiled by Cosmopolitan.

They initially signed with New York agency Wilhelmina Models in March 2004. They later switched to Ford Models. Runk started modelling full-time in 2011 after they moved to New York City. Their first major editorial was Body Language in US Vogue's April 2005 Shape issue, which was photographed by Steven Meisel.

In addition, they appeared twice in Glamour, most notably (in November 2009) nude with six other plus-size models including Ashley Graham, Crystal Renn and Lizzie Miller. Other editorials include Cosmo Girl in February 2006, Marie Claire in October 2007, and several Seventeen editorials. Runk was also interviewed by Vogue Italia's Vogue Curvy.

Their beachwear appearance in H&M's Summer 2013 campaign was featured on the front page of H&M's US website in late April 2013 and received extensive media coverage and spread rapidly through blogs and social media. As a result of the coverage, Runk wrote an op-ed piece for BBC on size diversity in fashion and their experiences as a model in May 2013.

Runk has modeled for many plus size retailers, including two Marina Rinaldi campaigns in 2012. Runk has also walked in several Elena Miro runway shows.

== Personal life ==
Runk lives in New York City. They own a one-eyed cat, Jasmine. Runk began taking a low dose of testosterone on July 14, 2024.
