= Jonathan Steuer =

American publisher (born 1965)

Jonathan Steuer (born December 3, 1965, in Wisconsin) is an online publisher.

Steuer led the launch teams of a number of early and influential online publishing ventures, including Cyborganic, a pioneering online/offline community, HotWired, the first ad-supported web magazine, and c|net's online operations. Steuer's article "Defining virtual realities: Dimensions determining telepresence" is widely cited in academic and industry literature. Originally published in 1992 in the Journal of Communication 42, 73-9, it has been reprinted in Communication in the Age of Virtual Reality (1995), F. Biocca & M. R. Levy (eds.).

Steuer's vividness and interactivity matrix from that article appeared in Wired circa 1995 and has been particularly influential in shaping the discourse by defining virtual reality in terms of human experience, rather than technological hardware, and setting out vividness and interactivity as axial dimensions of that experience. Steuer's notability in diverse arenas as a scholar, architect, and instigator of new media is documented in multiple independent, non-trivial, published works.

Steuer has been a consultant and senior executive for a number of other online media startups: CNet, ZDTV, Sawyer Media Systems and Scient.

Steuer has an AB in philosophy from Harvard University, and a PhD in communication theory & research from Stanford University. There, his doctoral dissertation concerned Vividness and Source of Evaluation as Determinants of Social Responses Toward Mediated Representations of Agency.

== Personal life ==
He is married to Majorie Ingall. A longtime resident of the Bay Area, today Steuer resides in New York City.
