= Evangelisches Gymnasium zum Grauen Kloster =

Coordinates: 52°31′07″N 13°24′45″E

Location
- Salzbrunner Straße 41–47; D-14193; Berlin; Germany

Information
- Type: Independent school
- Established: 1949
- Founder: Evangelical Church of Berlin-Brandenburg-Silesian Upper Lusatia
- Headmaster: Dr. Anette Martinez-Moreno
- Grades: 5 - 12
- Enrollment: 800 (approx.)
- Website: www.graues-kloster.de
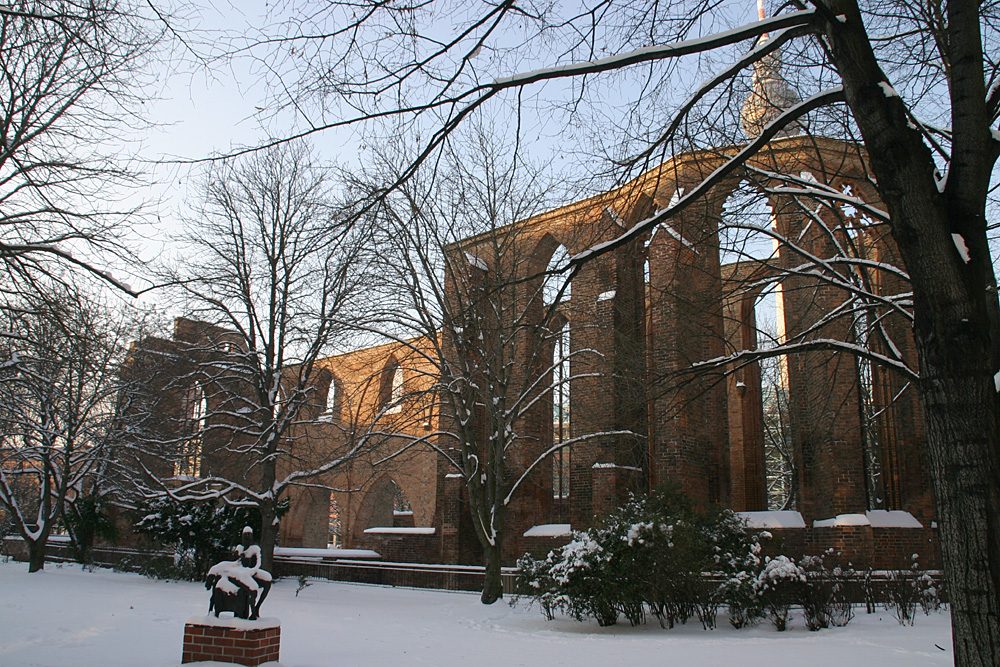
- Ruins of the original Evangelisches Gymnasium zum Grauen Kloster, in 2005

The Evangelisches Gymnasium zum Grauen Kloster, located in suburban Schmargendorf, Berlin, is an independent school with a humanistic profile, known as one of the most prestigious schools in Germany. Founded by the Evangelical Church in West Berlin in 1949 as the Evangelisches Gymnasium, it continues the traditions of the ancient Berlinisches Gymnasium zum Grauen Kloster, the oldest Gymnasium in Berlin, which for hundreds of years was situated in former monastery buildings in the city's Mitte district, closed by the East Germans in 1958. In 1963 the Evangelisches Gymnasium of West Berlin adopted its traditions and added "zum Grauen Kloster" to its name.

== Curriculum ==
The Evangelisches Gymnasium zum Grauen Kloster is one of the last schools in Berlin offering the entire range of classical education with Latin and Ancient Greek as compulsory subjects. The students learn foreign languages in this order: English (year 5), Latin (year 5), Ancient Greek (year 8), French (year 9 optional). Additionally, it is possible to learn Hebrew.

== Extracurricular activities ==
The debating society deserves particular mention as members of the society have won several Jugend debattiert student competitions over the last years. Rowing and Hockey are popular activities as well.

== History ==
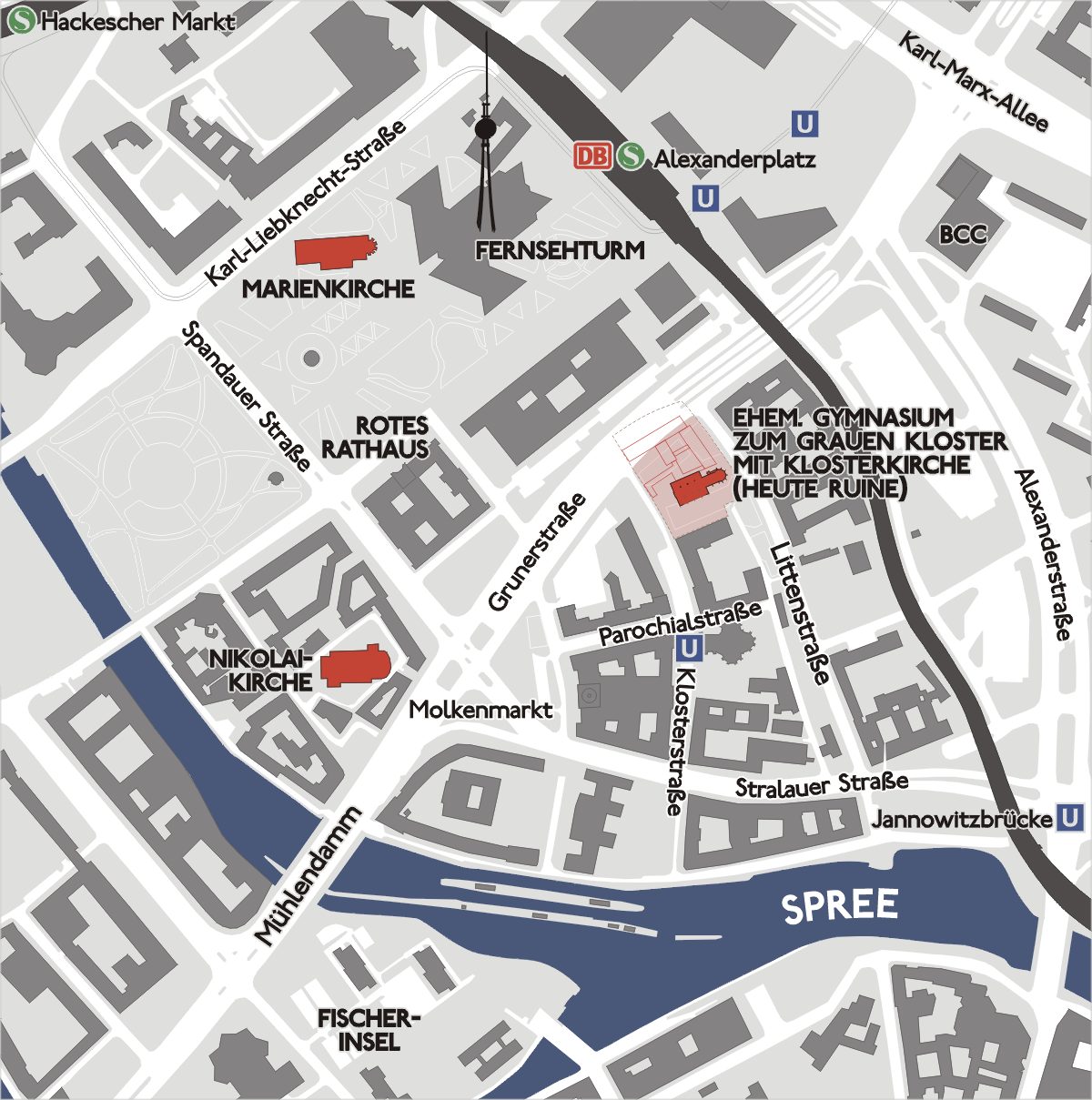
Original site in Mitte

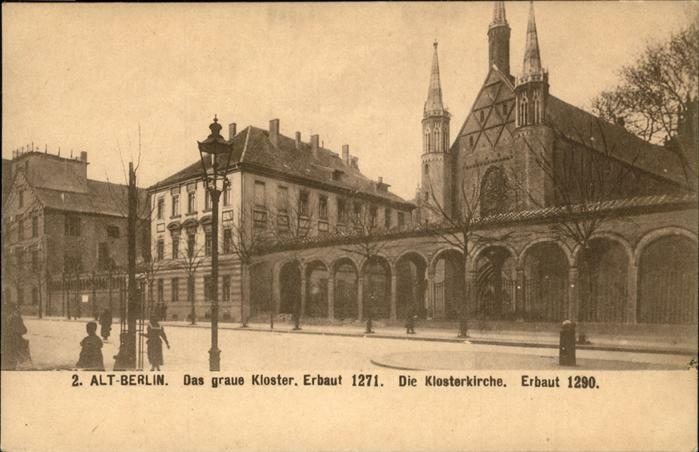
Das graue Kloster, about 1910

The original school was established on 13 July 1574 by Elector John George of Hohenzollern as the first Protestant Latin school in Brandenburg at the site of a medieval Greyfriars monastery (Graues Kloster), that had been secularised in 1539 in the course of the Reformation. The premises were centered around the Gothic abbey church dating from the 13th century, the ruins of which are still visible near Alexanderplatz.

After the ancient school's buildings had been destroyed by Allied air raids in 1945, the original school moved several times. After the political division of Berlin in 1949, the Gymnasium zum Grauen Kloster found itself in East Berlin and the Evangelical Church established the present school in West Berlin as the Evangelisches Gymnasium. This found a new home in Schmargendorf in 1954. In 1958 the Gymnasium zum Grauen Kloster was officially abolished by the Communist authorities, and in 1963 the Evangelisches Gymnasium adopted its traditions and name.

The remnants of the original school's library, including donations by Sigismund Streit and Christoph Friedrich Nicolai, are now kept at the Zentral- und Landesbibliothek Berlin.

== Notable alumni and staff of the Berlinisches Gymnasium ==
Alumni

- Johann Crüger (1598–1662), composer
- Johann Gottfried Schadow, (1764–1850), architect
- Friedrich Daniel Ernst Schleiermacher, (1768–1834), theologian and philosopher
- Karl Friedrich Schinkel, (1781–1841), architect
- Friedrich Ludwig Jahn (1778–1852), "father of gymnastics"
- Carl Ludwig Christian Rümker (1788–1862), astronomer
- Johann Gustav Droysen (1808–1884), German historian
- Carl Mayet (1810–1868), chess master
- Hermann Lebert (1813–1878), German physician, pathologist
- Hermann Bonitz (1814–1888), German scholar
- Johann Georg Halske (1814–1890), mechanic and entrepreneur (Siemens & Halske)
- Heinrich Ernst Beyrich (1815–1896), geologist
- Otto von Bismarck (1815–1898), German statesman
- Wilhelm Stieber (1818–1882), secret agent
- Emil Rathenau (1838–1915), entrepreneur
- Franz Hilgendorf (1839–1904), zoologist
- Paul Langerhans (1847–1888), pathologist
- Henri James Simon (1851–1932), entrepreneur
- Theodor Simon Flatau (1860–1937), physician
- Paul Hirsch (1868–1940), politician
- Eduard Spranger (1882–1963), philosopher
- Carlheinz Neumann (1905–1983), rower
- Franz/François Willi Wendt (1909–1970), painter
- Edward Ullendorff (born 1920), German-British academic
- Hans Georg Dehmelt (born 1922), physicist (Nobel Prize in Physics 1989)
- Hermann Prey (1929–1998), baritone
- Lothar de Maizière (born 1940), politician
- Anna Mila Guyenz (born 1995), fashion model

Staff

- Samuel Rodigast, (1649–1708), poet
- Johann Joachim Bellermann (1754–1842), Hebraist
- Karl Philipp Moritz (1757–1793), author
- Friedrich Daniel Ernst Schleiermacher (1768–1834), theologian
- Johann Gustav Droysen (1808–1884), historian
- Heinrich Bellermann (1832−1903), music theorist
- Anton Friedrich Büsching (1724–1793), geographer, headmaster from 1766

== Notable alumni of the Evangelisches Gymnasium ==
- Bernhard Britting (born 1940), rower
- Thekla Carola Wied (born 1944), actress
- Ulrich Matthes (born 1959), actor
- Florian Henckel von Donnersmarck (born 1973), director (Oscar 2007)

== See also ==
- Canisius-Kolleg Berlin
- Education in Germany
- Gymnasium (school)

== Bibliography ==
- Scholtz, H. (1998): Gymnasium zum Grauen Kloster 1874–1974. Bewährungsproben einer Berliner Gymnasialtradition in ihrem vierten Jahrhundert. Dt. Studien-Verl. ISBN 3-89271-768-0.
- Dietrich, M. (1997): Berlinische Kloster- und Schulhistorie. Neudr. [der Ausg.] Berlin, Nicolai, 1732. Scherer. ISBN 3-89433-031-7.
- Eckstein, F.A. (2005): Nomenclator Philologorum. 1871, Hamburg: korr. Ausgabe von Johannes Saltzwedel Digitalisat
