= Giuseppe Nogari =

Italian painter (1699–1766)

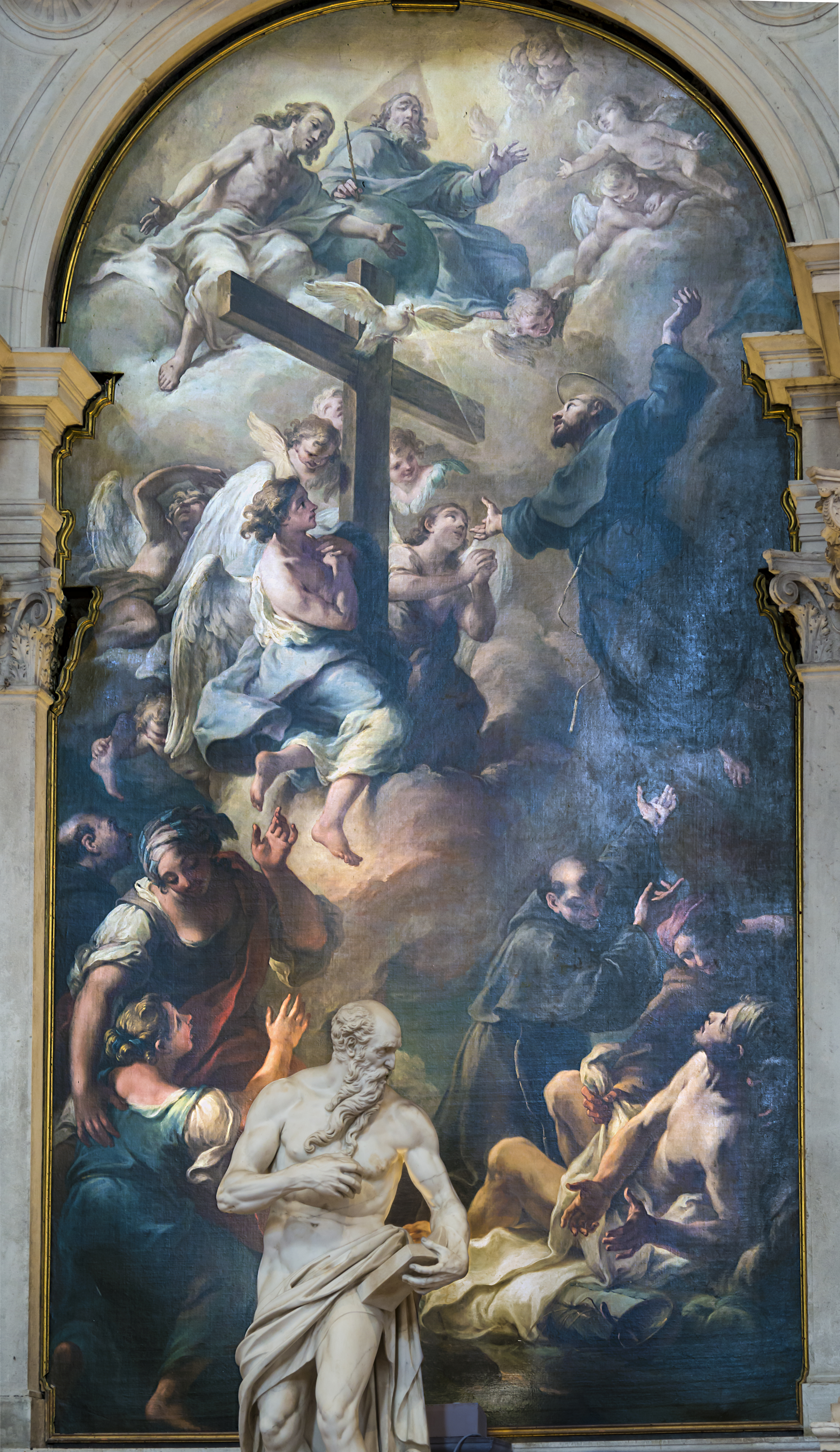
The Miracle of St. Joseph of Cupertino

Peter the Apostle, 1743

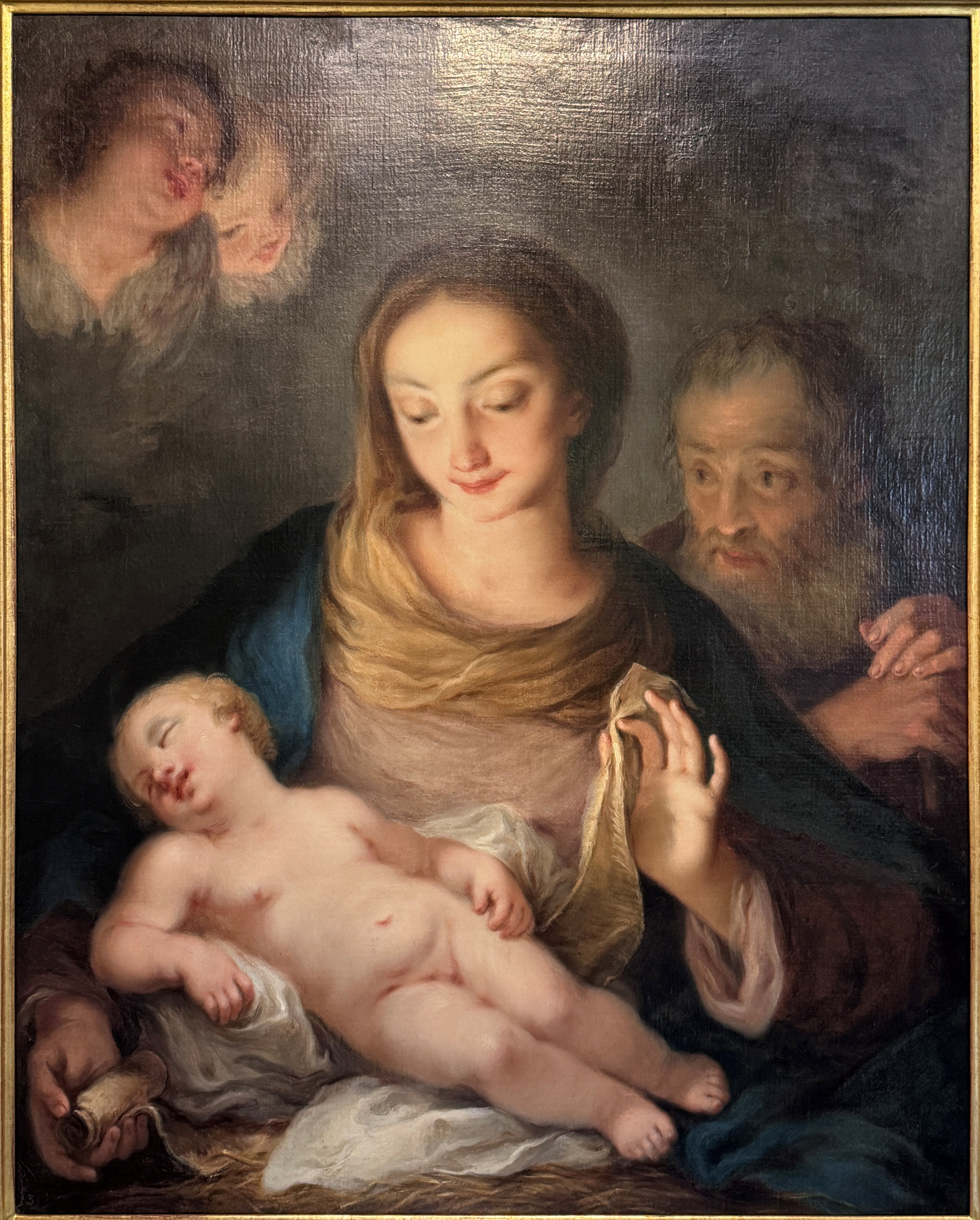
Holy family with angels, Anhaltische Gemäldegalerie Dessau

Giuseppe Nogari (1699 – 3 December 1766) was an Italian painter of the Rococo. He painted mainly painted half-body portraits, either real or of historical and religious figures. They are striking for their emotional content, subdued decoration and coloration, and often display aged individuals in somewhat homely or shabby attire with a dark background.

== Biography ==
Nogari was born in Venice. He is said to have trained under Antonio Balestra or, more likely, under Giovanni Battista Piazzetta. He followed the latter' style, as well as those of Rosalba Carriera, Jacopo Amigoni, and Rembrandt. He was patronized by two German patrons in Venice, Sigismund Streit and Johann Matthias von der Schulenburg.

From 1739 to 1742 Nogari worked for the House of Savoy in Turin, painting canvasses and decorating the Royal Palace of Turin and the hunting lodge at Stupinigi. In 1756, he became a member of the Venetian Accademia di Pittura e Scultura. Alessandro Longhi was one of his pupils.

In 1997, a painting by Nogari was used in a sting wherein employees, including an Old Masters expert of Sotheby's in London, smuggled the painting out of Italy.

== Sources ==
- Web Gallery of Art Biography
