= Franziskaner-Klosterkirche =

Destroyed church in Berlin-Mitte

Coordinates: 52.5183°N 13.4128°E

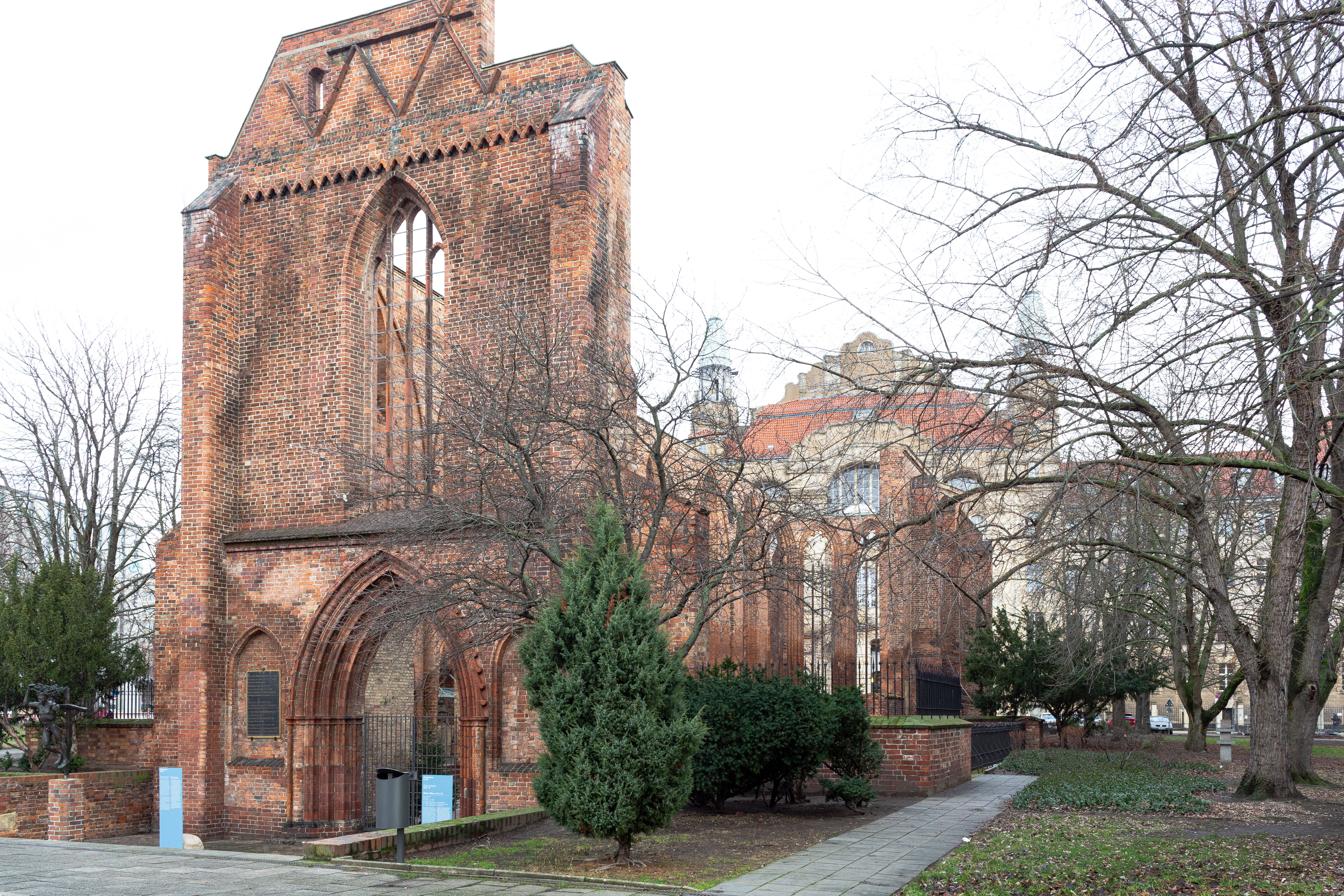
Church ruins of the former monastery

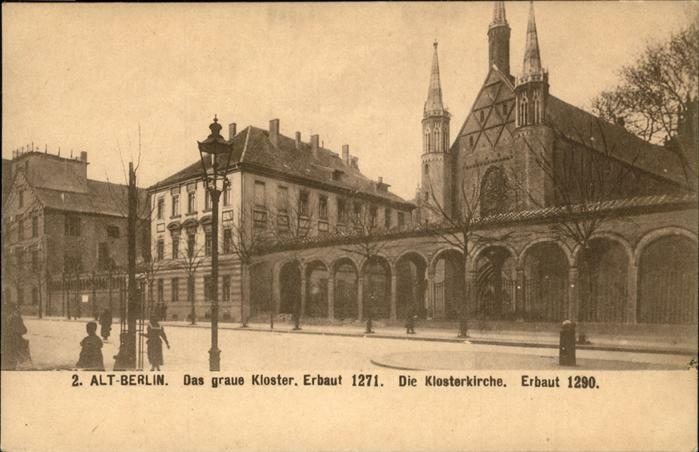
Postcard of the monastery buildings and church around 1910

The Franziskaner-Klosterkirche was a church in the Klosterstraße in the Mitte district of Berlin, Germany, founded in 1250 and now in ruins. The church was once the church of the Graues Kloster (Grey Monastery).

== History ==
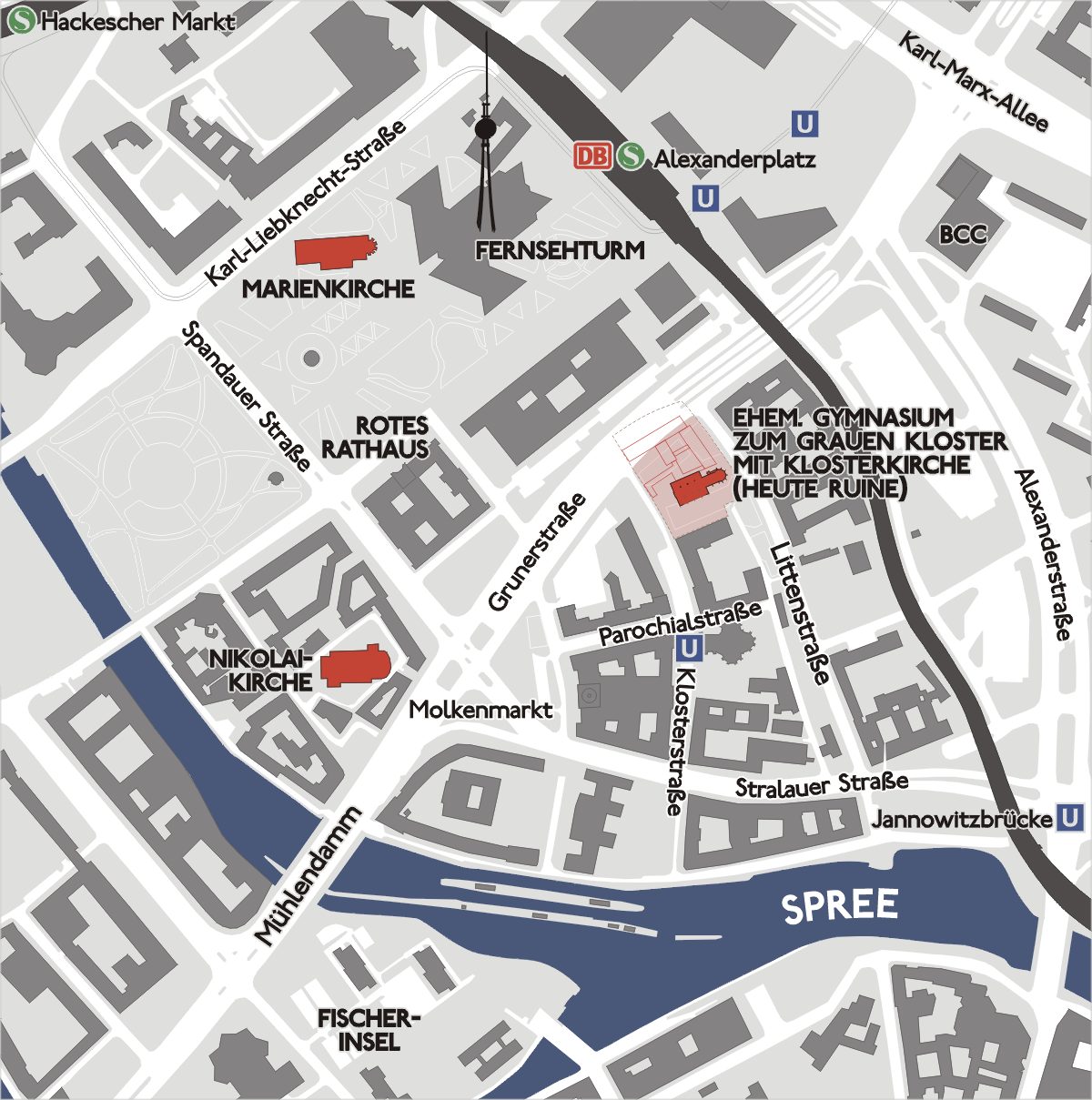
Location of the former Franciscan monastery and the Marienkirche and Nikolaikirche churches in Berlin

It was founded in 1250 in the early Gothic style as a monastery church for a Franciscan house. It was a fieldstone church, 52 metres long and 16 metres wide. Its remains can be found in the north wall of the present ruins. This was replaced with a three-aisled brick basilica church, begun at the end of the 13th century and completed in the first half of the 14th century, whose ruins still survive. In 1365 Louis II, Elector of Brandenburg was buried there. Around 1500 it was renovated.

The monastery was closed due to the Protestant Reformation's arrival in Berlin in 1539. None of the monastic buildings survive, though some of them housed Berlin's first printing press from 1571 and the Evangelisches Gymnasium zum Grauen Kloster from 1574. Pupils and teachers at the latter included Karl Friedrich Schinkel and Friedrich Ludwig Jahn, whilst Otto von Bismarck also visited the church. Leonhard Thurneysser ran the printing press and also restored the church between 1583 and 1584.

Small modifications were made in the second half of the 17th century, such as demolishing the old staircase tower, building a new timber staircase on the west side and in 1712 demolishing the rood screen separating the nave from the chancel. 1712 also saw a fire in the church's roof and in 1719 the church was restored, raising the floor level by 1 metre and bricking up two northern choir windows.

Extensive renovations were carried out in the first half of the 19th century - the gabled tower was demolished in 1826, two new towers were built on the west side in 1842, a new sacristy was built and the floor lowered again. Plans were produced for the work by Karl Friedrich Schinkel, Christian Gottlieb Cantian and the former track-inspector Berger was preceded by the construction work - Berger's second design was that ultimately implemented. Work lasted until 1845, though the church was closed due to severe damp in its masonry in 1902 and in 1926 most of the 19th century changes were reversed. The church was re-consecrated on 24 May 1936.

The church was destroyed on 3 April 1945 in the bombing of Berlin in World War II. In 1950 the debris was removed and the church ruins secured between 1959 and 1963, although the ruined monastic buildings were demolished completely to make way for a park. The ruins were restored again in 2003-2004 and are now used for exhibitions, plays and concerts.

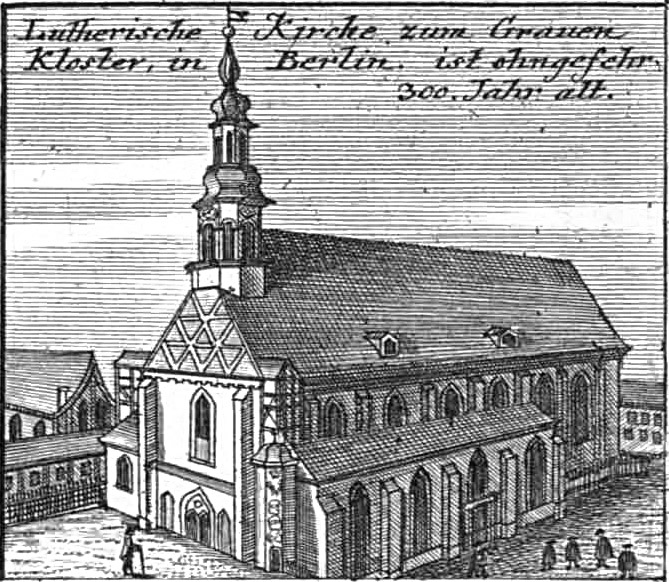
Picture of the monastery church, 1757

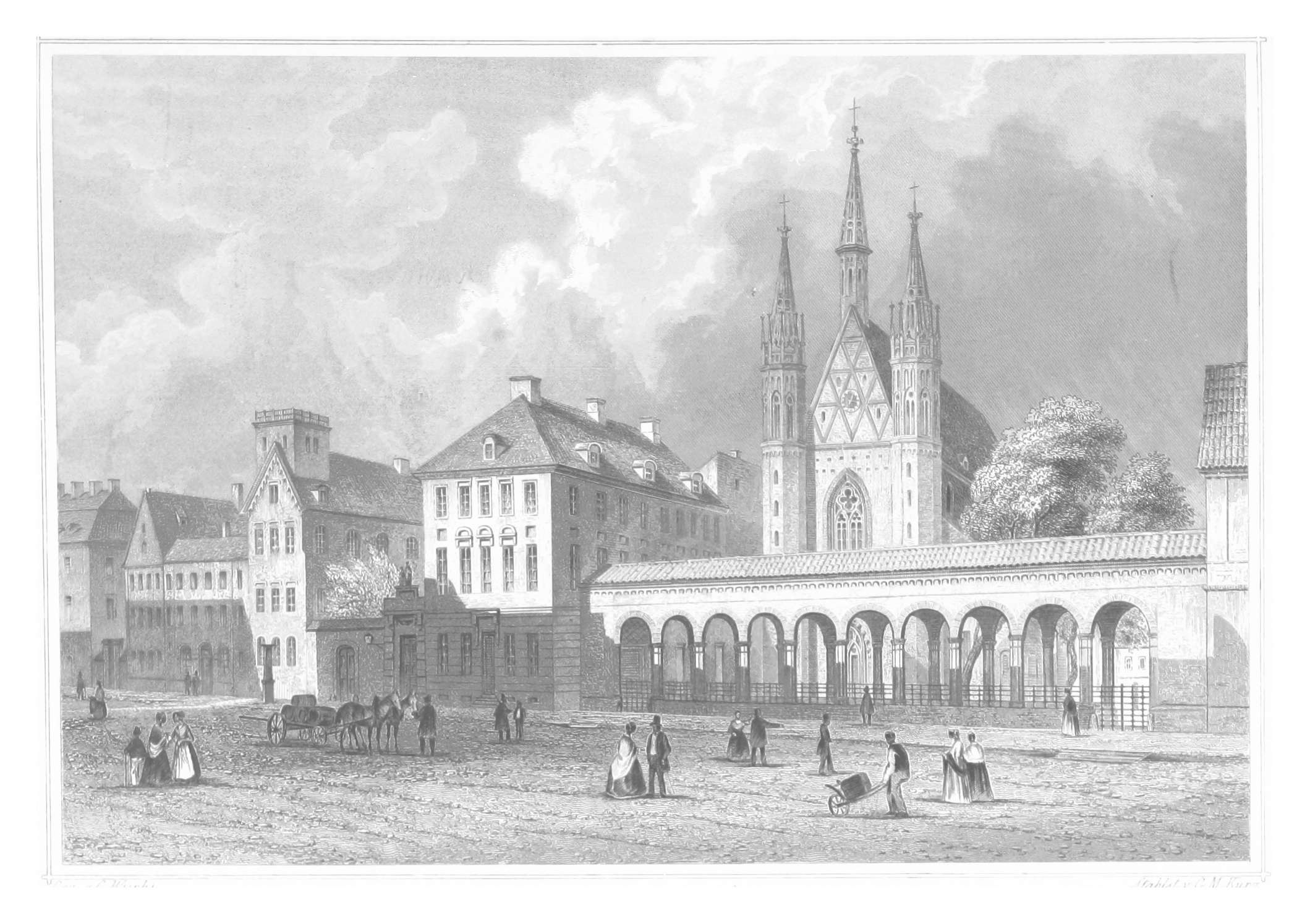
Picture of the Grey Monastery and the monastery church, 1852

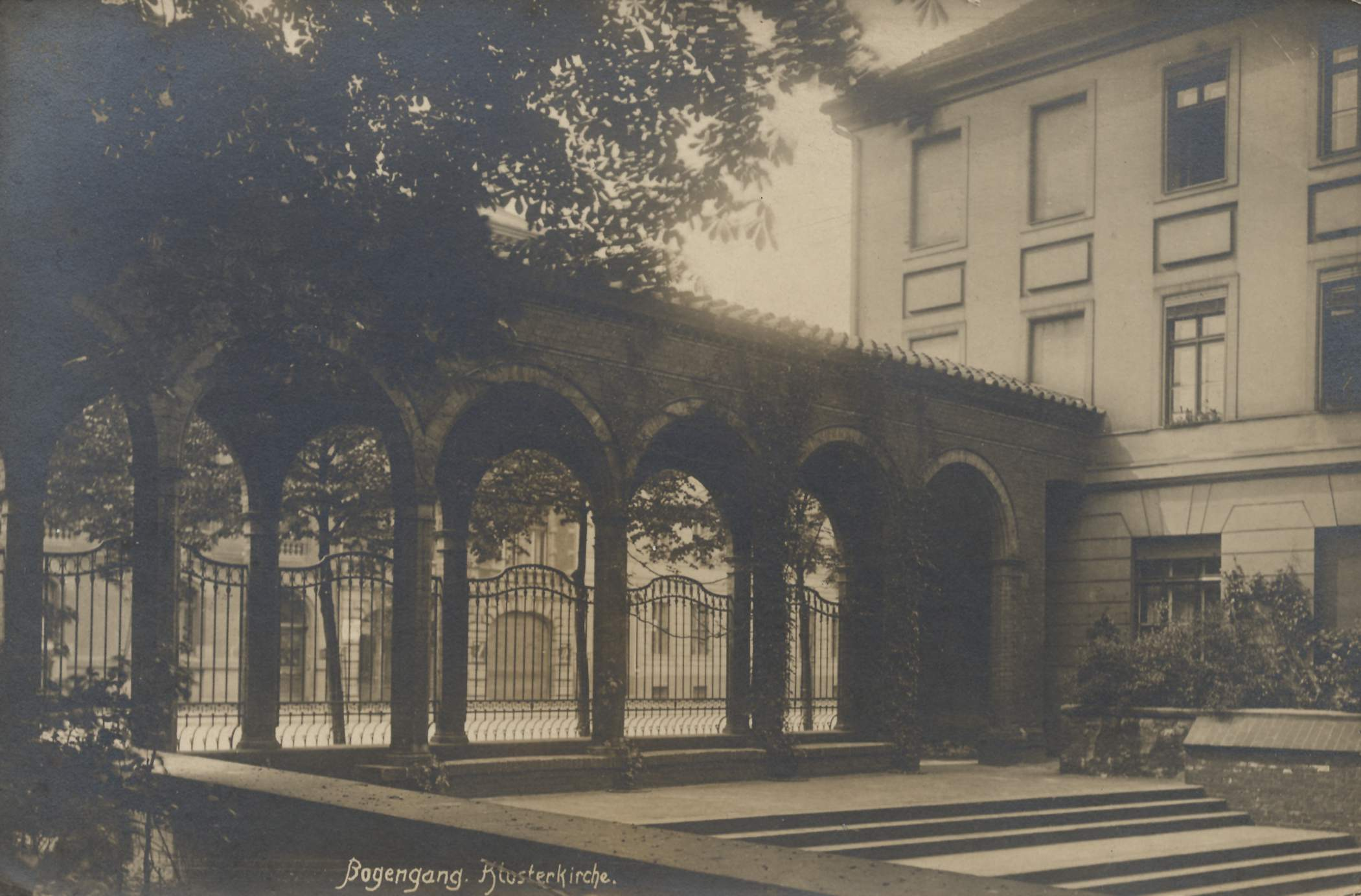
Picture of the arcades seen from the monastery church, ca. 1900

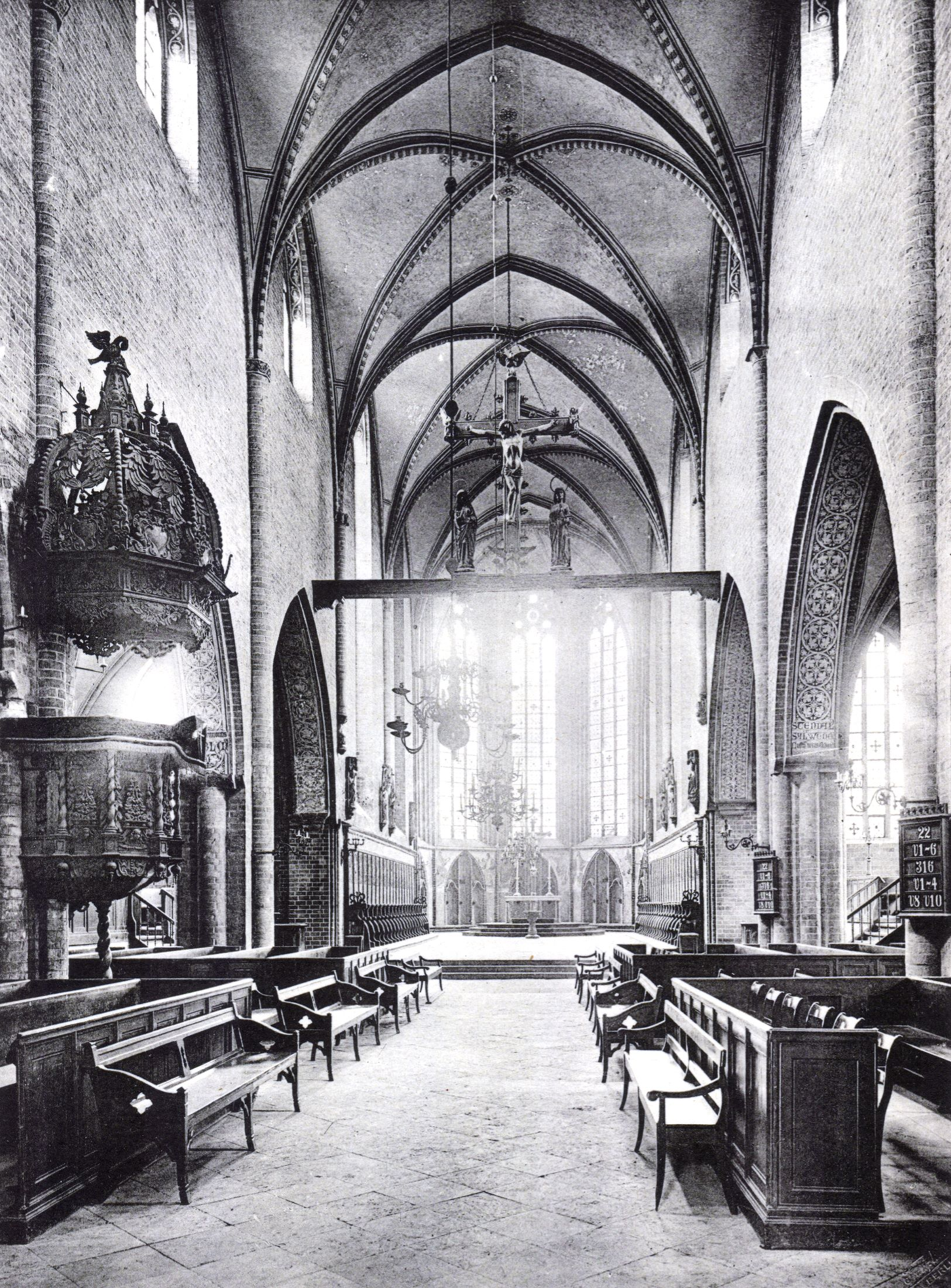
Interior of the church around 1896

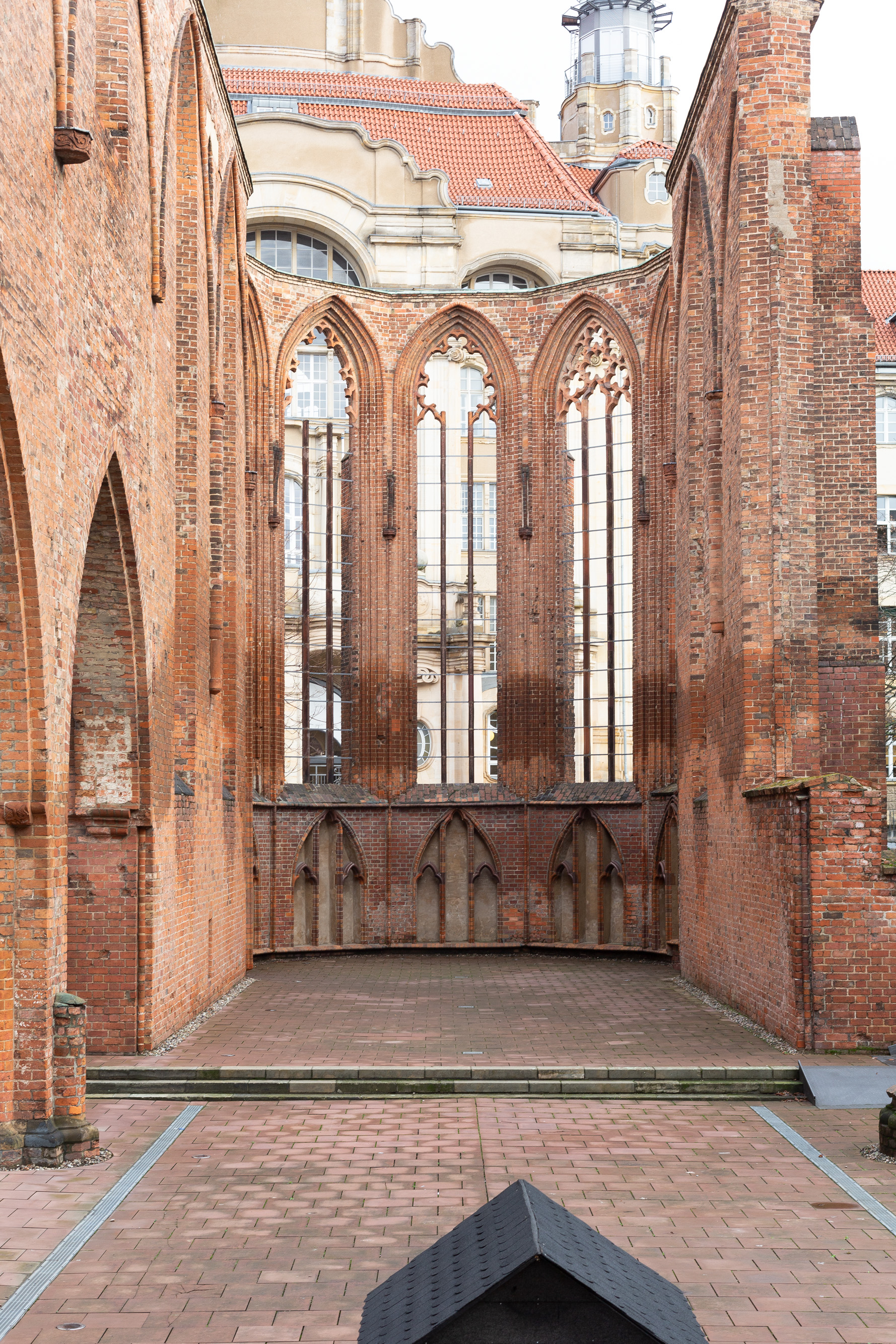
Similar perspective in 2022

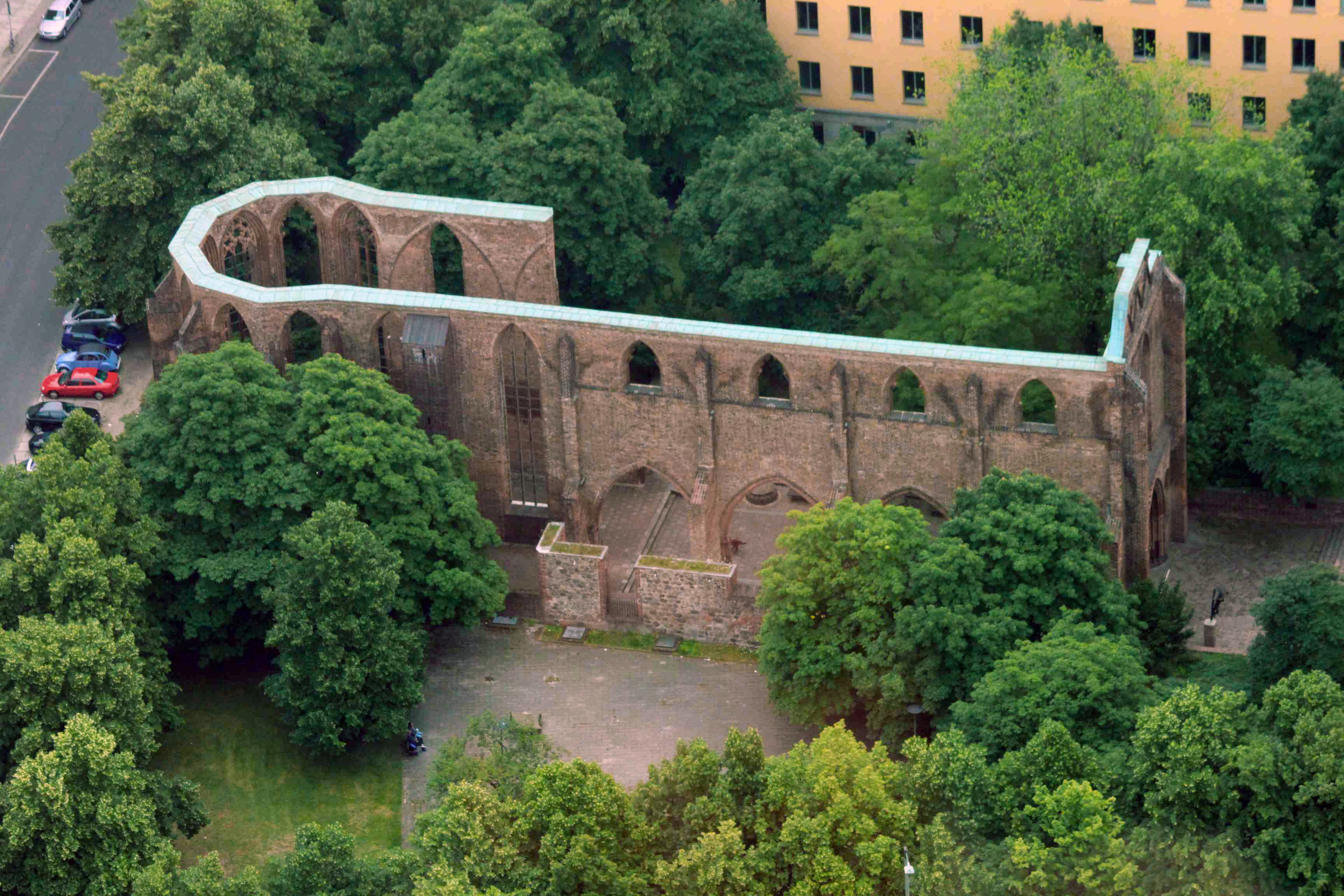
The ruins from the Fernsehturm

== Bibliography ==
- Kirchenruine des Grauen Klosters in Berlin. Hrsg. vom Landesdenkmalamt Berlin. Michael Imhof Verlag, Petersberg 2007 ISBN 978-3-8656-8200-0.
- Gerhard Bronisch, Die Franziskaner-Klosterkirche in Berlin. Inaugural-Dissertation zur Erlangung der Doktorwürde der Philosophischen Fakultät der Universität Leipzig, vorgelegt 1933
- http://www.stadtentwicklung.berlin.de/cgi-bin/hidaweb/getdoc.pl?DOK_TPL=lda_doc.tpl&KEY=obj%2009011276%5B%5D
- http://www.klosterruine-berlin.de/
