= Marjorie Ingall =

American writer of non-fiction

Marjorie Ingall is an American writer of non-fiction. Her work has focused on topics including parenting, Jewish culture, women's health, and humor.

== Career ==
Ingall was a writer for Sassy magazine, writing under the byline of Margie Ingall. She wrote for Self magazine from 2006 until 2010. She has contributed to Kveller.com, Real Simple, and other publications.

She is currently a contributing writer for Tablet magazine and contributes articles and reviews of children's and young adult books for The New York Times. She wrote the East Village Mamele column for The Forward from 2002 until 2009.

Ingall is one of the two authors of the SorryWatch blog, in which she and Susan McCarthy analyze apologies in the news, media, history and literature.

== Personal life ==
Ingall graduated from Harvard University in 1989. She is married to Jonathan Steuer.

== Bibliography ==
- Mamaleh Knows Best: What Jewish Mothers Do to Raise Successful, Creative, Empathetic, Independent Children. Potter/TenSpeed/Harmony. 30 August 2016. ISBN 978-0804141413.
- Hungry: A Young Model's Story of Appetite, Ambition and the Ultimate Embrace of Curves (with Crystal Renn). Simon and Schuster. 8 September 2009. ISBN 978-1-4391-0972-4.
- Smart Sex (with Jessica Vitkus). Pocket Books. 1 January 1998. ISBN 978-0671019105.
- The Field Guide to North American Males. Owlet Books. January 1997. ISBN 978-0805042191.
