= Swimsuits For All =

Online women's swimwear retailer

Swimsuits For All is an online retailer for women's swimwear, specializing in sizes 4 and up. It was founded in 2005 by current CEO and President Moshe Laniado, and was acquired in October 2014 by New York-based plus size fashion company, Fullbeauty Brands.

== Press campaigns ==
In May 2013, Swimsuits For All introduced a “fatkini” collection, mutually designed with plus-size fashion blogger Gabi Gregg, who coined the term and popularized curvy bikinis. The collection of plus size swimsuits sold out in 48 hours. In February 2015, the plus size swimwear retailer launched its #CurvesInBikinis campaign, which quickly went viral and starred Ashley Graham as the first plus-size model featured in an ad in the Sports Illustrated Swimsuit Issue. Swimsuits For All announced its exclusive partnership with Ashley Graham in December 2015 to make her the face of the brand, and in May 2016, the two launched their first joint swimwear collection, Ashley Graham x Swimsuits For All. In April 2019, plus-size model Ashley Graham and comedian Sherri Shepherd joined Kelvin Davis for a swimsuit campaign. The campaign featured a video commercial.
