= Anna Mila Guyenz =

German fashion model

- Born: 16 December; Berlin, Germany
- Occupation: Model
- Modeling information
- Height: 1.79 m (5 ft 10 1/2 in)
- Hair color: Blonde
- Eye color: Blue
- Agency: Ford Models (New York); Uno Models (Barcelona); Elite Model Management (Copenhagen); Stockholmsgruppen (Stockholm); MINT Artist Management (Berlin) (mother agency)

Anna Mila Guyenz is a German fashion model.

== Early life and career ==
Guyenz was born in Berlin, Germany, and speaks multiple languages in addition to German, including English, French, Ancient Greek, and Latin, which she learned as a student at Evangelisches Gymnasium zum Grauen Kloster, a humanist school. She was discovered by PARS Management's Peyman Amin, a former judge of Germany's Next Topmodel, while shopping with her mother in Berlin.

In 2015, Guyenz was chosen as a Versace exclusive by Donatella Versace to walk in their S/S 2016 fashion show. She has also walked the runway for designers Chanel, Oscar de la Renta, Emporio Armani, Isabel Marant, Elie Saab, Dolce & Gabbana, John Galliano, Versus (Versace), and Giambattista Valli. In February 2016, she appeared in a story for Elle UK with Lameka Fox and other models. In summer 2017, she appeared in an H&M advertisement alongside Luna Bijl, Birgit Kos, Mayowa Nicholas, and Maartje Verhoef. In Vogue, she appeared in a photoshoot titled "Upward Spiral" about Petra Collins. Representing a newcomer, in contrast to the established Joan Smalls, she appeared in a campaign for Italian brand Liu Jo.
