= Sigismund Streit =

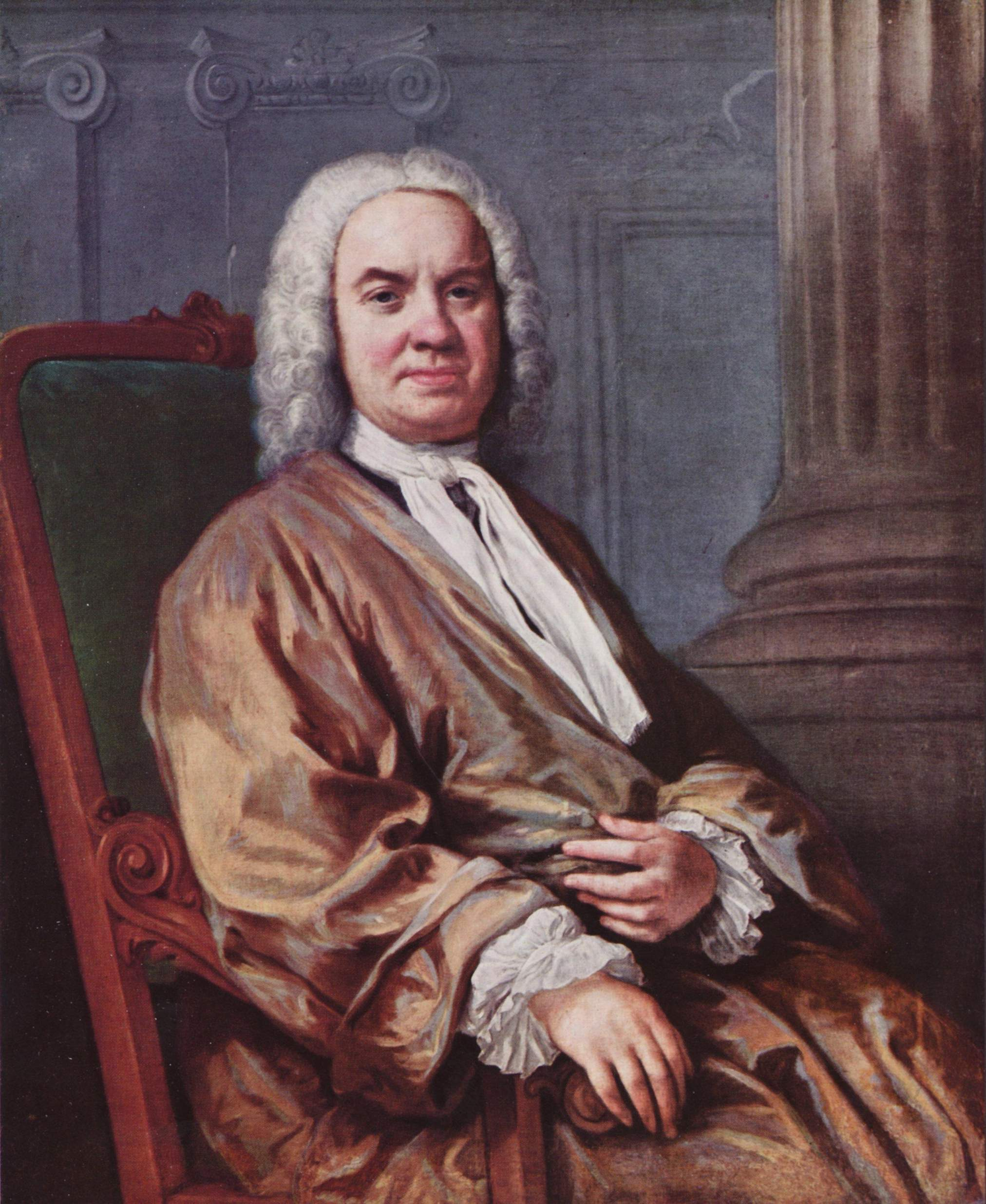
- Streit by Jacopo Amigoni, 1739
- Born: 13 April 1687; Berlin, Brandenburg
- Died: 20 December 1775 (aged 88); Padua, Venice

Sigismund Streit (13 April 1687 – 20 December 1775) was a Kingdom of Prussia merchant and art patron of the 18th century in Venice.

== Life ==
Born in Berlin, he came to Venice in 1709, where he accumulated substantial wealth. He died childless and bequeathed his collection as foundation to institutions in the Holy Roman Empire, in particular the Berlinisches Gymnasium zum Grauen Kloster in Berlin. He came to own paintings by Canaletto, Antoine Pesne, Jacopo Amigoni, Francesco Zuccarelli, and Giuseppe Nogari. He was a contemporary of another patron Johann Matthias von der Schulenburg.
