= Rachel Clark =

American model

- Born: West Palm Beach, FL, U.S.
- Modeling information
- Height: 1.80 m (5 ft 11 in)
- Hair color: Brown
- Eye color: Hazel
- Agency: MP MEGA MIAMI (Miami Beach)

Rachel Clark is an American model. Clark was born in West Palm Beach, Florida, and currently resides in New York City, New York. Clark's interests include anime, billiards, online role-playing games, comic books, and karaoke. She is known to be friends with fellow models Jourdan Dunn, Iekeliene Stange, Erin Heatherton, Tyler Riggs, Sofia Berelidze, Arisce Wanzer, and Hanne Gaby Odiele.

Clark's modeling career began when she was signed by modeling agencies Women Management (in Paris and Milan) and Supreme Management in the United States in 2007. Clark is also connected to Storm Models in London and Mega Models in Miami. Clark has appeared in magazines such as Harper's Bazaar and Russian Vogue, with covers of Portuguese Elle (May 2007), French Mixte (April 2008), Italian Flair (August 2008), and Italian Amica (June 2009). She has also appeared in ad campaigns for Levi's, Louis Vuitton, D&G, and Neiman Marcus, and walked the runway for Christian Dior, John Galliano, Erin Fetherston, Hermès, Yves Saint Laurent, Lanvin, Dries Van Noten, Givenchy, Louis Vuitton, Donna Karan, Proenza Schouler, Salvatore Ferragamo, Karen Walker, Catherine Malandrino, Isaac Mizrahi, Stella McCartney, Ann Demeulemeester, and William Rast.

In April 2008, Clark signed on as one of the faces of the Victoria's Secret Pink line alongside Chanel Iman and Behati Prinsloo.
