= American Beauty Star =

American reality television series

- Country of origin: United States

Original release
- Network: Lifetime
- Release: September 21, 2017 – March 27, 2019

American Beauty Star is an American competition reality television series on Lifetime.

== Cast ==
=== Season 1 ===
- Adriana Lima as Host
- Russell James as Judge
- Sarah Brown as Judge
- Sir John as Mentor
- Amanda Terry as Contestant
- Andrew Velazquez as Contestant
- Catherine Shim as Contestant
- Corey Ford as Contestant
- Danny Jelaca as Contestant
- Jenny Strebe as Contestant
- John Blaine as Contestant
- Kym Nicole Oubre as Contestant
- Mitchell Halliday as Contestant
- Sandy Poirier as Contestant
- Silvia Reis as Contestant
- Tyme The Infamous as Contestant

== Episodes ==
| Season | Episodes | Originally released | |
| Season | Episodes | First released | Last released |
|---|---|---|---|
| 1 | 10 | September 21, 2017 | November 30, 2017 |
| 2 | 13 | January 2, 2019 | March 27, 2019 |

=== Season 1 ===
| No. overall | No. in season | Title | Original release date | U.S. viewers (millions) |
|---|---|---|---|---|
| 1 | 1 | "Who Are You" | September 21, 2017 | N/A |
| 2 | 2 | "Red Carpet Mayhem" | September 28, 2017 | N/A |
| 3 | 3 | "A Quick Tip Tutorial" | October 5, 2017 | N/A |
| 4 | 4 | "Pop-Up Beauty" | October 12, 2017 | N/A |
| 5 | 5 | "Emergency Makeover" | October 19, 2017 | N/A |
| 6 | 6 | "Rock the Catwalk" | October 26, 2017 | N/A |
| 7 | 7 | "Legends in Their Own Minds" | November 2, 2017 | N/A |
| 8 | 8 | "The Four Seasons of Beauty" | November 9, 2017 | N/A |
| 9 | 9 | "Take a Stand with Teen Vogue" | November 16, 2017 | N/A |
| 10 | 10 | "The Future of Beauty" | November 30, 2017 | N/A |

=== Season 2 ===
American Beauty Star Reunión

| No. overall | No. in season | Title | Original release date | US viewers (millions) |
|---|---|---|---|---|
| 11 | 1 | "My Signature Slay" | January 2, 2019 | N/A |
| 12 | 2 | "America Is Beautiful" | January 9, 2019 | N/A |
| 13 | 3 | "Blasts from the Past" | January 16, 2019 | N/A |
| 14 | 4 | "Cosmo Magazine's Viral Style" | January 23, 2019 | N/A |
| 15 | 5 | "Red Carpet "Sparkle" Ready" | January 30, 2019 | N/A |
| 16 | 6 | "Waitress Worthy Makeovers" | February 6, 2019 | N/A |
| 17 | 7 | "Modern Brides" | February 13, 2019 | N/A |
| 18 | 8 | "Hero vs. Villain Face Off" | February 20, 2019 | N/A |
| 19 | 9 | "Inspired By..." | February 27, 2019 | N/A |
| 20 | 10 | "Creating a Beauty Empire" | March 6, 2019 | N/A |
| 21 | 11 | "Catwalk Couture" | March 13, 2019 | N/A |
| 22 | 12 | "Out of Their Elements" | March 20, 2019 | N/A |
| 23 | 13 | "America Decides the Winner" | March 27, 2019 | N/A |

== See also ==
- List of programs broadcast by Lifetime
