= Miroglio =

Italian company

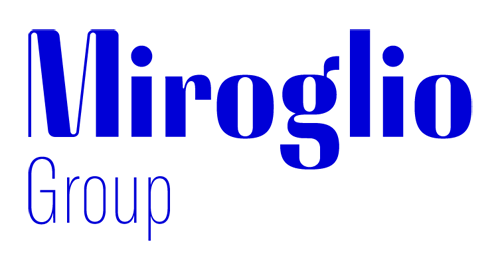
- Founded: 1947
- Founder: Giuseppe Miroglio
- Headquarters: Italy
- Products: Clothes

Miroglio is an Italian firm specialising in the manufacture and distribution for sale of ready-to-wear clothing. Incorporated in Alba, Piedmont, Cuneo, Italy, the Group has 30 business operations in 41 countries and 1,100 branded stores (of which 800 in Italy and 300 in Turkey and the Middle East).

== History ==
The firm was established in Alba in 1947 by Giuseppe Miroglio, son of Carlo and Angela Miroglio, both of whom ran a drapery business at the turn of the 19th century. The move from trade to industry dates back to when Giuseppe Miroglio decided to venture into the production of silk fabrics and the installation of looms.

Vestebene (now Miroglio Fashion) was established in 1955. This division is dedicated to mass-production of fashionable women's clothes. In 1958, the Miroglio Group broadened its sphere of activity by opening a modern dyeing, special cloth finishing and textile-printing plant, thereby completing the fabric-to-garment production chain.

Vestebene started moving some of its production away from Italy in the 1970s, initially to Greece and then to other countries, from Tunisia to Egypt, throughout the Mediterranean. At the same time its fabric division diversified into the thread, yarn, and transfer paper industries. Over the course of the next two decades, the group opened new manufacturing operations in Southern Italy, particularly in the Apulia region.

In 1973, the Fondazione Opera Elena Miroglio (now the Fondazione Elena e Gabriella Miroglio) was established. This has a focus on raising awareness of cultural, welfare, and social issues. Emphasis is placed on activities oriented towards Group employees (healthcare and economic support) and towards their children (nurseries, holiday camps, scholarships) and, not least, towards the group's pensioners, providing them with pleasure trips and other recreations.

The Elena Mirò brand was launched in 1985. (From 2005 to 2020, the brand has been targeted at the more generous sizing womenswear sector.) By the mid-1980s, the Group was forging a strategic alliance with leading stylists such as Moschino and Krizia. Eventually other brands were born, such as Caractère and Diana Gallesi, as well as Motivi in 1993.

Another milestone along the route to internationalisation was the Group's entry into the Bulgarian market, accomplished in 2001 through acquisition of a legendary production site at Sliven.

In October 2002, the president of the Italian Republic conferred on Carlo Miroglio, chairman of the Miroglio Group, the Cavaliere di Gran Croce (Knight Grand Cross), an insignia bestowed on those who, in the course of their life and professional career, have been singularly meritorious with long and conspicuous service in social, commercial and industrial activities.

Gaining shape in 2003 were rumours of imminent withdrawal by Miroglio from its spinning manufacturing facilities in Southern Italy, starting with the production site at Castellaneta earmarked for shut down in the Spring 2004.

In December 2004, Miroglio formed a joint venture with the Chinese company Elegant Prosper which specializes in mid/upper bracket womenswear. By the end of 2006, the Miroglio group managed one thousand stores. In June 2008, the Miroglio group acquired a stake in the Turkish group Ayaydin which specialized in womenswear fashion. The group's production site at Ginosa in Apulia shut down in 2008 and sparked parliamentary questions and debate.

In December 2019, Alberto Racca became the CEO of Miroglio.

In March 2024, Miroglio acquired Trussardi as an independent brand based in Milan, expanding its market portfolio into menswear, accessories, and leather goods, as well as extending into the lifestyle sector.

== Activities ==
Miroglio Group operates throughout the entire fashion and retail supply chain. It creates and distributes 10 fashion brands, including Trussardi, Elena Mirò, Motivi, Oltre, Fiorella Rubino, Diana Gallesi and Luisa Viola. Three brands are managed through a partnership with the Turkish Ipekyol Group: Ipekyol, Machka and Twist.

Miroglio's company Sublitex is world leader in water-free transfer printing on paper and technical film for the textile, fashion and architectural markets.

== Bibliography ==
- Carugati Decio G.; Marsano Beba Vestebene Miroglio. Cinquant'anni di storia attraverso la moda 2005, 101 p., ill., rilegato Mondadori Electa (collana Industria e design)
