= Liu Jo =

Italian fashion company founded in 1995

Liu Jo S.p.A.
- Company type: Public (S.p.A.)
- Industry: Fashion
- Founded: 1995; 31 years ago
- Headquarters: Carpi, Italy
- Key people: Marco Marchi; Vannis Marchi
- Products: Clothing, watches, jewelry, shoes, fashion accessories, cosmetics
- Revenue: €368 million (2018)
- Number of employees: 868 (2018)
- Website: www.liujo.com

Liu Jo (stylized as LIU•JO) is an Italian high fashion company founded by Marchi brothers in 1995 in Carpi, Italy. As of 2022, the company has 160 stores in Italy and another 200 located primarily in Europe.

== History ==
Liu Jo was born as a small textile industry, and developed during the mid-1990s into a major Italian brand of pret-a-porter fashion. The name Liu Jo derives from the nicknames used by Marco Marchi (Jo) and one of his youth companions (Liu). The first launch of the Liu Jo and Liu Jeans collections on the Italian market were first distributed through the multi-brand channel and, later on the single-brand channel both on the domestic market and abroad.

In the next five years Liu Jo expanded its productions launching an Accessories collection of jewels and watches, a Baby collection for little girls, an Underwear and Beachwear collection as well as Homewear. Since 2008, Liu Jo has its own Shoes collection.

The Spring-summer 2011 collection advertising campaign features model Kate Moss.

In 2012, Liu Jo opened a 350 square meters flagship store in Milan. The shop has been realised by the Italian contract company L&S group.

In 2013, Liu Jo signed a licensure agreement with Marchon Eyewear to manufacture eyewear.

The Fall-winter 2014 collection advertising campaign features model Dree Hemingway.

Liu Jo collaborated in 2016 with Karlie Kloss and Jourdan Dunn followed in 2017 by Martha Hunt and Jasmine Tookes from spring-summer season, and Joan Smalls and Anna Mila Guyenz for autumn-winter season.

Liu Jo started to sponsor the Bologna football team in 2016, with the home hostesses wearing company's clothing for home league games. In the 2018–19 and 2019–20 seasons of Italian Serie A Championship, Liu Jo was the main sponsor of Bologna.

In March 2017, a corporate reorganization of the company was made, with brother Vannis leaving the board and remaining a shareholder with about 10%, while brother Marco remaining the controlling shareholder.

On 5 November 2019, the founder and creative director of Liu Jo, Marco Marchi, enters through a capital increase in Coin department store chain with 15%. Also in November 2019 Liu Jo acquires Blufin, the fashion house founded in Carpi by Anna Molinari and Gianpaolo Tarabini with the Blu Girl and Miss Blumarine brands, as part of an operation that leads to the birth of "Italian Excellence", a holding company aggregation of high-end brands. Anna Molinari will remain in the role of ambassador.
