= Elena Mirò =

Italian fashion house

Elena Mirò is an Italian fashion brand with international distribution and is an ambassador of Made in Italy.

The Elena Mirò brand originated in 1985 "within the Alba, Piedmont-based clothing company Vestebene (now Miroglio Fashion)." The brand was born to wear women "with fuller figures who wear shapely sizes". Among its featured models were Jennie Runk, Crystal Renn, and Lizzie Miller.

In recent years, Elena Mirò has extended the range of sizes from 42 to 58 (Italian sizes).The brand expanded its size range from Italian size 42 to 58 in recent years. Elena Mirò focuses on clothing designed for women with fuller figures and has promoted initiatives related to women's empowerment.This is why it has always carried out projects dedicated to women's empowerment, to help build a world that is desirable and sustainable for all.

== Distribution ==
Elena Mirò is distributed internationally through more than 160 single-brand stores and corners in the most important Italian and European locations, 800 multi-brand customers (600 in Italy). It has active e-commerce in 14 countries, and 6 marketplaces.

== History ==
- 1985 Elena Mirò was born in Alba, in the heart of the Langhe, in Italy
- 1997 The brand's presence in Italy is consolidated and international development begins with the opening of the first store in Paris
- 1999 The brand develops its presence in the Iberian Peninsula
- 2005 Elena Mirò shows for the first time at "Milano Collezioni"
- 2016-2019 Collaboration with Vanessa Incontrada as testimonial of the brand
- 2020 New logo
- 2021 Repositioning of the Brand towards size extension. Collaboration with Alessandro Dell'Acqua for the Fall Winter Collection
- 2021 Opening of the Flagship store in Via Dante, in Milan
- 2022 Capsule Collection with Korean designer Lisa Von Tang for Spring Summer 2022
