= Crystal Renn =

American model and author (born 1986)

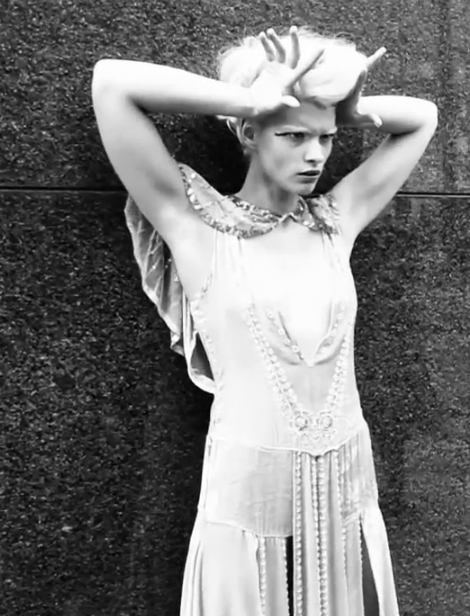
- Renn posing in April 2012.
- Born: Crystal Renn; June 18, 1986 (age 40); Miami, Florida, U.S.
- Occupation: Fashion model
- Spouse: Gregory Vrecenak (2007–2009)
- Modeling information
- Height: 5 ft 9 in (1.75 m)
- Hair color: Dark brown
- Eye color: Brown
- Agency: JAG Models (New York); Elite Model Management (Paris); Storm Management (London); MP Stockholm (Stockholm)

Crystal Renn (born June 18, 1986) is an American model and author.

== Personal life ==
Renn started her modeling career in high fashion at the age of 14 after being spotted by a professional scout in her hometown in Clinton, Mississippi. Renn was told she would need to lose almost a third of her total body weight if she wanted to become a model. Later, after years of anorexia nervosa, Renn reassessed her diet and exercise habits. After gaining 70 pounds (32 kg) and re-emerging as a U.S. size 12, she was re-marketed by her agents as a plus-size model. Renn has authored a book, Hungry: A Young Model's Story of Appetite, Ambition and the Ultimate Embrace of Curves, about her experiences in the fashion industry in relation to her several body type transformations.

On June 30, 2007, Renn married her longtime boyfriend Gregory Vrecenak at the Church of St. Ignatius Loyola in Manhattan, New York. Fashion portraits of her wedding were taken by photographer Brian Boulos. In mid-2009 the couple ended their marriage. Renn resides in Brooklyn, New York.

In November 2010, Renn said she had lost weight through hiking and yoga, and that her dress size dropped to a US 8.

== Career ==
Renn has worked repeatedly with fashion photographers Ruvén Afanador and Steven Meisel. Crystal has enjoyed lucrative contracts with many high-profile plus-size clothing manufacturers such as Lane Bryant, Evans and Torrid.

She has appeared in editorials for American, Australian, Italian, French, German, Spanish, Japanese, Latin American, and Teen Vogue, Italian Elle, Russian, Australian and American Harper's Bazaar, Glamour, V, i-D and Vanity Fair. Renn also appeared in the 2012 Sports Illustrated Swimsuit Issue.

She has walked the runways for Shiatzy Chen, Chanel, Zac Posen, Vena Cava, Heatherette, Elena Miro, and Jean Paul Gaultier.

Renan has appeared in campaigns for Philipp Plein, Chanel, Dolce & Gabbana, Jean Paul Gaultier, Jimmy Choo, DSquared², Zac Posen, Mango, Liz Claiborne, Barneys New York, Saks Fifth Avenue, Lord & Taylor, Nordstrom, and H&M.

Renn also appeared in back-to-back campaigns in 2007 wearing big crayons and regular-sized (not plus-size) clothing for Spanish retailer Mango. Her photos appeared amid those of smaller models without noting her larger size, a rare occurrence in conventional apparel advertising.

In 2011, Renn became the face of the spring/summer campaign for Jimmy Choo and the spring/summer MR Denim Collection by Marina Rinaldi, a plus-size jeans collection.

Renn's first book, Hungry, was co-authored by Marjorie Ingall and released on September 8, 2009. Renn reported for Glamour at New York Fashion Week 2010 on the fall collections. As of 2012, Renn's yearly income was in the high six figures.

== References and sources ==
- Renn, Crystal (2009). Hungry: A Young Model's Story of Appetite, Ambition, and the Ultimate Embrace of Curves. Simon and Schuster. ISBN 978-1-4391-0123-0.
