= Wilhelmina Models =

Modeling agency headquartered in New York City

Wilhelmina International Inc.
- Type: Public company
- Traded as: Nasdaq: WHLM
- Industry: Modeling and talent agency
- Founded: New York City, U.S.(1967)
- Founder: Wilhelmina Cooper; Bruce Cooper
- Headquarters: New York City; Los Angeles; Miami; London
- Area served: Worldwide
- Key people: Mark E. Schwarz (CEO); James A. McCarthy (CFO)
- Website: wilhelmina.com

Wilhelmina International Inc. (NASDAQ: WHLM), formerly Wilhelmina Models, is a modeling and talent agency headquartered in New York City, US. The company also has offices in Los Angeles, Miami and London. Founded in 1967 by Wilhelmina Cooper, it provides representation and management to models, entertainers, artists, musicians, and athletes. In 2009, the company became the first and only publicly traded modeling and talent agency after its acquisition by New Century Equity Holdings Corp.

== History ==
Wilhelmina International Inc. was founded in 1967 by German-American model Wilhelmina Cooper and husband Victor Bruce Cooper, as well as minority partners Bill Weinberg and Fran Rothchild. As of 1997, the company is one of the oldest and largest full-service model management companies in the world.

After Wilhelmina Cooper died in 1980 at age 40, the agency was transferred to her business partners, and was then bought in 1989 for around 4 million dollars by Horst-Dieter Esch, a German businessman with interests in the construction industry. Esch held discussions with Elite Model Management and Ford Models with a view to creating a large conglomerate agency that would be taken public, but this did not happen. The company was incorporated in Delaware in 1996.

In 1998, Wilhelmina partnered with Atlantic Records and created an Artist Division that matched music artists with international brands. In January 2015, the firm opened an office in London and 2016 in Chicago. Also in 2016, Wilhelmina launched Aperture, a talent and commercial agency that represents models and actors for film, commercials, television and theatre with offices in New York City and Los Angeles.

In February 2009, New Century Equity Holdings Corp, a publicly traded company, acquired Wilhelmina Models. Esch sold his stake in the agency for 22 million dollars. New Century subsequently changed its name to Wilhelmina International, Inc. trading under the ticker symbol 'WHLM'. The company licenses its brand to third-party agencies in countries around the world, including the United States and Dubai.

As of 2010, Wilhelmina represents and manages 2,100 models, celebrities, artists, athletes and content creators worldwide, including Nicki Minaj, Niall Horan, Normani, Iggy Azalea, Demi Lovato, Nick Jonas, Machine Gun Kelly, 5 Seconds of Summer, Alexandra Waterbury, James B. Whiteside, Nadia Ferreira, Leona Lewis, Shawn Mendes, Dustin Lance Black, Kendall Jenner, Bianca Balti, Lindsay Ellingson, Karolína Kurková, Marlon Teixeira, Francisco Lachowski, Kelsey Merritt, Noah Mills, Alex Lundqvist, Mark Vanderloo, Gabriel Aubry, Barbie Ferreira, Robyn Lawley, Sora Choi, Aija Bārzdiņa, Rola Ghorab, Anne de Paula, Tanner Zagarino, Billie Eilish, Jasmine Blandford, and others.

After trading OTC, Wilhelmina entered the NASDAQ Capital Market in September 2014.

In 2016, Wilhelmina spent $2.7 million on a stock buyback, funded by a 4.5-year term loan from Amegy Bank. The company modified the loan terms and bought another $1 million of stock (150,000 shares) in 2018. At the end of 2019, the balance on the loans was $2 million. From 2012 until the end of 2019, the company repurchased over 1.3 million shares.

At the end of 2019, the company had 114 employees, with 70 of those in New York City and two at the corporate headquarters in Dallas. The Dallas office is shared with Newcastle Partners, the company's largest shareholder: Schwarz's Newcastle and Schwarz entities own 47% of the stock. Total revenue in 2019 was $75.4 million, down from $77.9 million in 2018. The company posted a loss of $4.8 million in 2019, compared to a $0.85 million profit in 2018.

On April 15, 2020, Wilhelmina received $2 million in federally backed small business loans from Amegy Bank as part of the Paycheck Protection Program. The company received scrutiny over this loan, which was aimed at small businesses.

== See also ==
- List of modeling agencies
