= Marina Rinaldi =

Italian women's clothing brand

- Company type: SRL
- Industry: Fashion
- Founded: 1980
- Founder: Achille Maramotti
- Headquarters: Reggio Emilia, Italy
- Parent: Max Mara Fashion Group
- Website: marinarinaldi.com

Marina Rinaldi is a ready-to-wear, plus-size women's clothing brand of the Italian Max Mara Fashion Group, one of the best known of the company’s 35 different labels. It has more than 300 stores worldwide, including ones located in the high fashion shopping districts of several major cities: Wilshire Boulevard in Beverly Hills, Madison Avenue in New York City, Old Bond Street in London, and Corso Vittorio Emanuele in Milan.

== History ==
Founded in 1980, Marina Rinaldi Group takes its name from the great-grandmother of the founder of Max Mara Fashion Group, Achille Maramotti, who in 1850 owned a fashion atelier in Reggio Emilia, Italy. Since 1984 its collections have been available internationally from stores in such cities as Paris, Tokyo, Moscow and Düsseldorf. Until the founding of Marina Rinaldi there was no fashion group concerned with the fashion needs of curvaceous women.

== Marketing ==
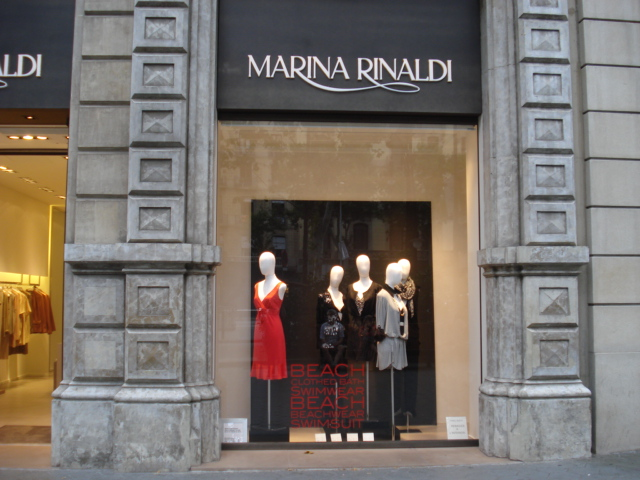
A Marina Rinaldi store window from July 2011

Marina Rinaldi began advertising in 1981. From its very first advertising campaigns, developed together with Emanuele Pirella, the brand developed a pioneering concept in an area where advertising aimed at fatter women was nonexistent. The first idea was to present a line of clothing that could satisfy the needs of women who had, until then, been neglected by fashion and stylists. Marina Rinaldi was the first to introduce the Italian expression taglia comoda (“plus-size”, literally, “comfortable size”), replacing the traditional term taglia forte (“outsize”) which had been used until then to describe this type of product. Marina Rinaldi has employed photographers in its advertising, including Arthur Elgort, Peter Lindbergh, Patrick Demarchelier, Greg Kadel, and Craig McDean. The faces of the brand have included India Hicks from Autumn-Winter 1998 to Autumn-Winter 2000, Carré Otis from Spring-Summer 2002 to Autumn-Winter 2003, and Tatjana Patitz from autumn 2009.

In 1991 MR Characters, the brand’s house organ, became the first Italian magazine dedicated entirely to the demands and desires of curvaceous women, and included not only fashion reports, but also articles on design, literature, art, cooking, travel, beauty and wellness. In 1992, 450,000 copies of the first issue of this free semiannual magazine were distributed in English, French and Spanish translation at Marina Rinaldi stores worldwide.

In July 2010 Marina Rinaldi collaborated with UK pop band Temposhark using their songs Joy and Crime to promote their latest fashion campaigns. Since then they have collaborated with Ashley Graham, Precious Lee and other well known plus size celebrities and brands.

In February 2012, Melissa McCarthy wore Marina Rinaldi at the 2012 Academy Awards.

== See also ==
- Italian fashion
