= Eliana Bórmida =

Argentinean architect

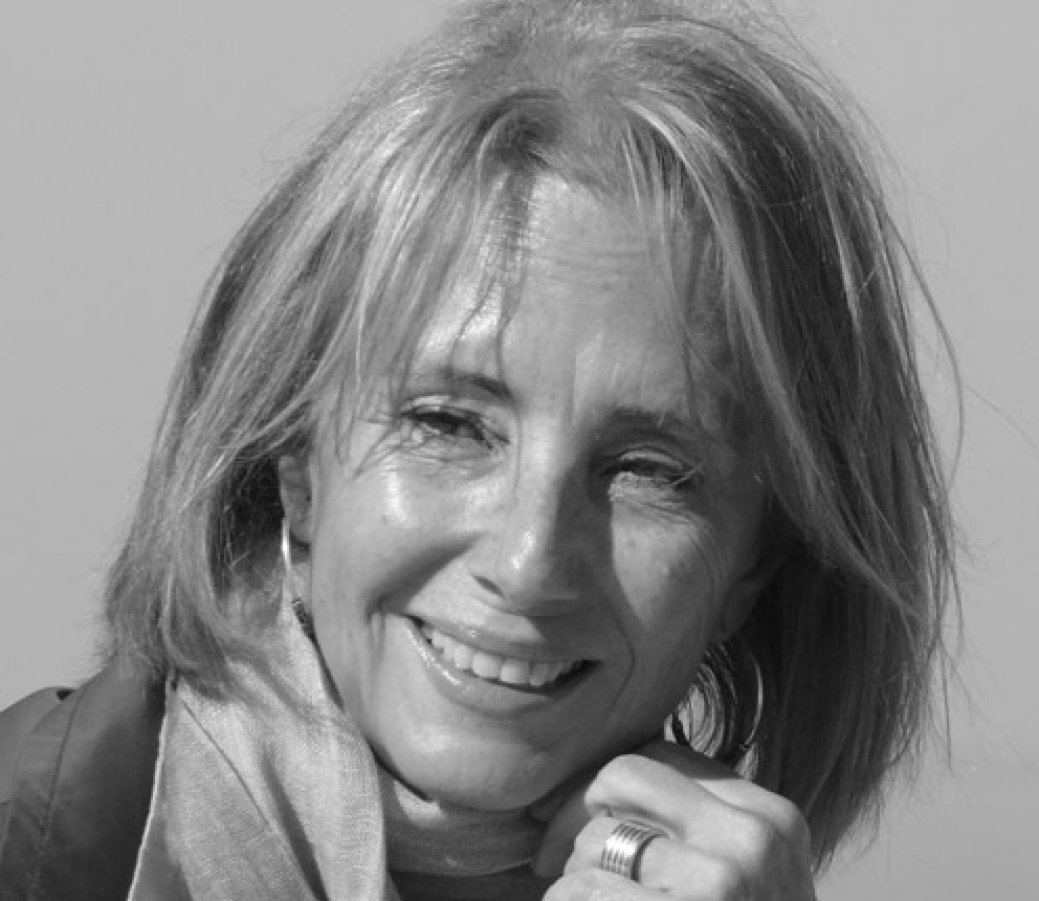
- Born: 29 July 1946 (age 80); Mendoza, Argentina
- Education: University of Mendoza
- Occupation: Architect
- Awards: Order of the Star of Italian Solidarity (2007); Konex Award (2012)

Eliana Bórmida (born 29 July 1946) is an Argentine architect, co-owner of the Bórmida & Yanzón studio, based in Mendoza, Argentina and specializing in wine cellars. Since 1988 the studio has worked on projects for more than 30 wineries, which have been disseminated in national and international media, and several have received awards. Bórmida combines her activity at the studio with academic pursuits, developing an extensive career in the field of heritage preservation. In 2012 she received the Konex Award for Architecture.

== Early years ==
In childhood, Eliana Bórmida became interested in the humanities, art, drawing, and reading. She studied at a normal high school and was determined to study philosophy. When she was in high school she traveled to Chicago on an exchange scholarship, and there she became interested in architecture when she met an architect, a relative of the family that she was staying with. When she returned home, Bórmida enrolled in the University of Mendoza's recently inaugurated Faculty of Architecture. This was directed by Enrico Tedeschi and had professors from Córdoba, Santa Fe, and San Juan who promoted the modern movement and an integral way of understanding design. She graduated in 1972. Her classmate Mario Yanzón later became her partner and husband.

== Career ==
She co-founded the architecture studio Bórmida & Yanzón with Mario Yanzón. After Bórmida and Yanzón divorced, the associates continued working together in the same arrangement. One of their daughters, Luisa Yanzón, is an architect and also works for the studio doing interior design.

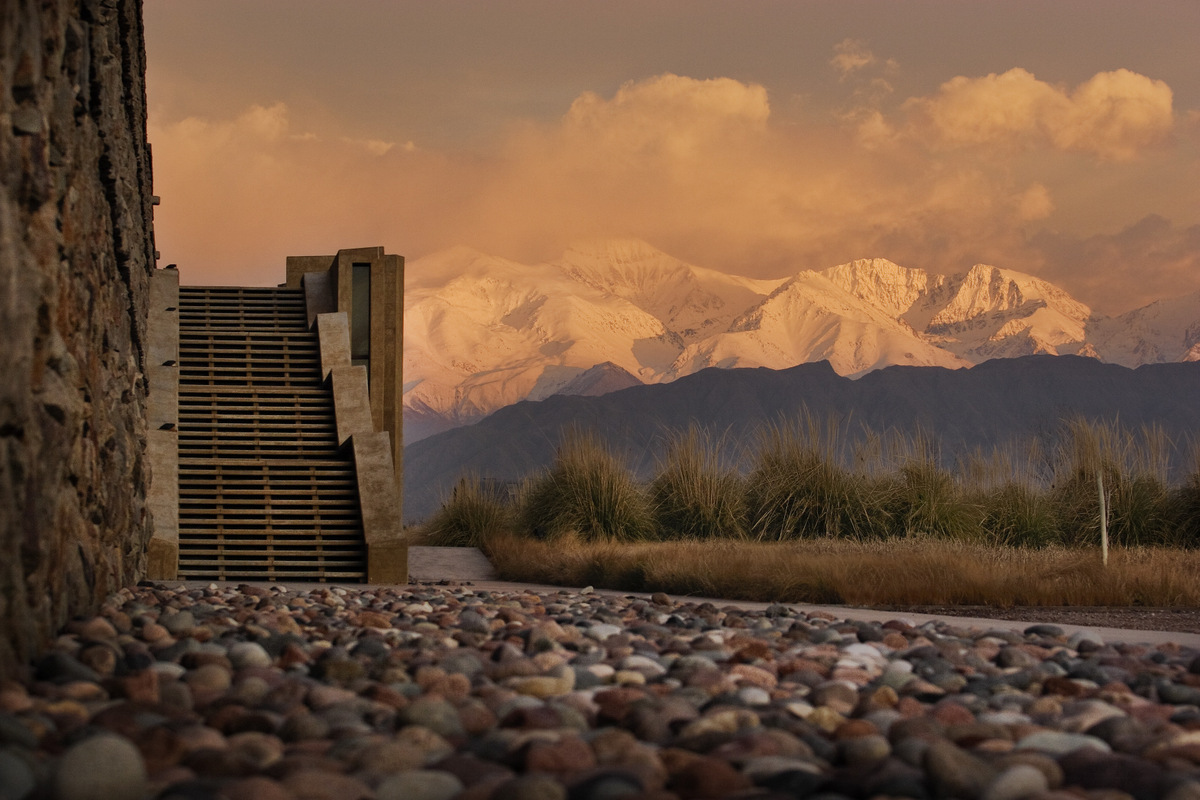
Bodega Séptima, with architecture by Bórmida

Bórmida has been a professor emeritus at the University of Mendoza since 2011, where she was associate professor of History of Architecture and Urban Planning from 1973 to 2005 and founder and director of the Institute of Architectural and Urban Culture. Alberto Nicolini worked with her to consolidate the institute. There she developed themes of cultural heritage and Andean regional identity and initiated a line of research on Cultural Heritage of Wine in Mendoza. She was called on by the Regional Government of Andalusia to edit, together with Graciela Moretti, an architectural guide for Mendoza. At the University of Mendoza, she was director of the ICAU from 1992 to 2005.

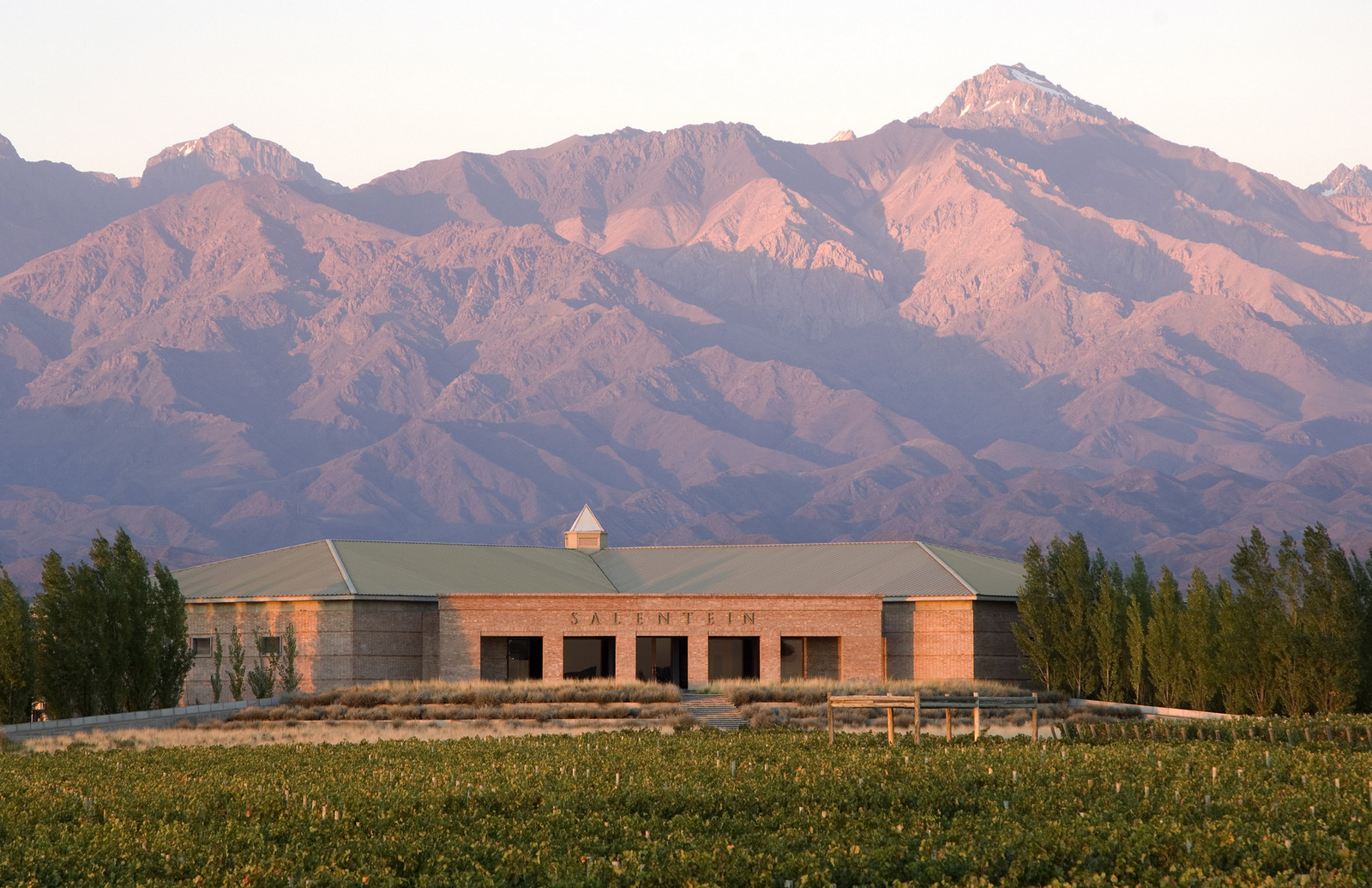
Bodega Salentein, which she contributed design to

From 1995 to 2003 she was a delegate of the National Commission of Museums and of Monuments and Historical Places (CNMMyLH) and of the International Council on Monuments and Sites (ICOMOS) Argentina. Bórmida started on this track early in her career when she participated in the meetings organized by the Institute of History coordinated by Marina Waisman, a pioneer in the field in Argentina. In 2007 she was recognized by the Office of the President of Italy with the Order of the Star of Italian Solidarity. In 2014 she was declared an illustrious citizen of the city of Mendoza.

In 2014, she remained engaged with her studio and was a participant in meetings and specialized publications related to agro-industrial architecture, agricultural tourism, and the conservation and promotion of natural and cultural heritage. In June 2025, Time Out reported that since co-founding Bórmida & Yanzón with Mario Yanzón, she had led over thirty winery projects in Argentina, including in Cafayate. She also led largescale projects such as a hotel at Lago Moreno, and the Vesta residential building in Mendoza.

== Style ==
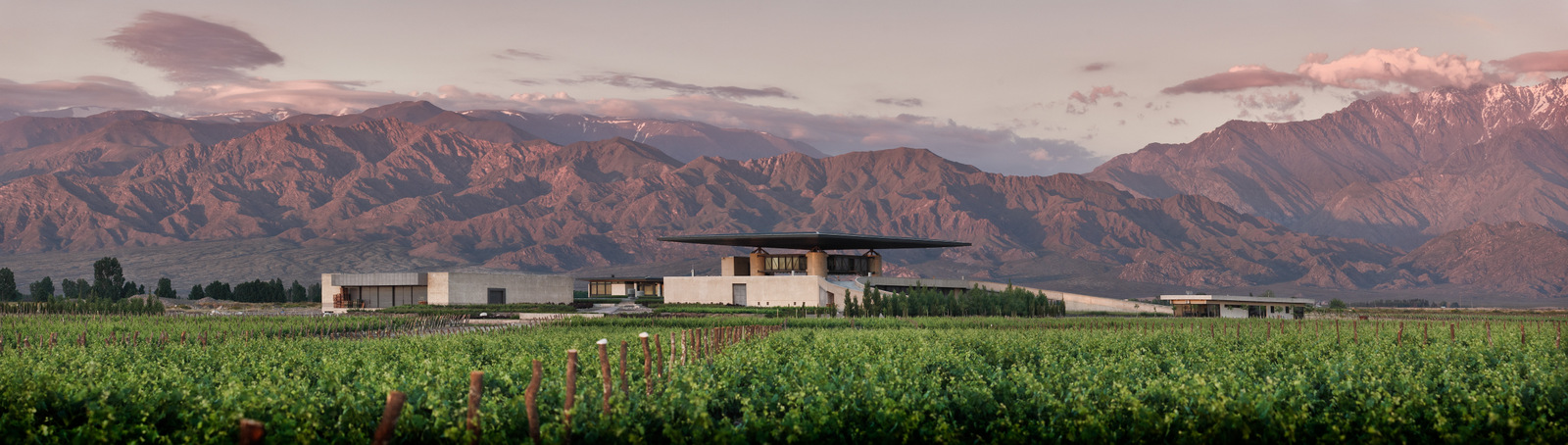
Bodega O Fournier, with architecture of the winery by Bórmida

Her winery designs have been described as "Andes, oasis, and desert," with mind paid to the landscape and the senses.

Bórmida's works are based on an integrative conceptualization of architecture and context, understood as a natural and cultural landscape, which seeks to give architecture a transcendent support and projection, to contribute to regional identity.

== Selected works ==
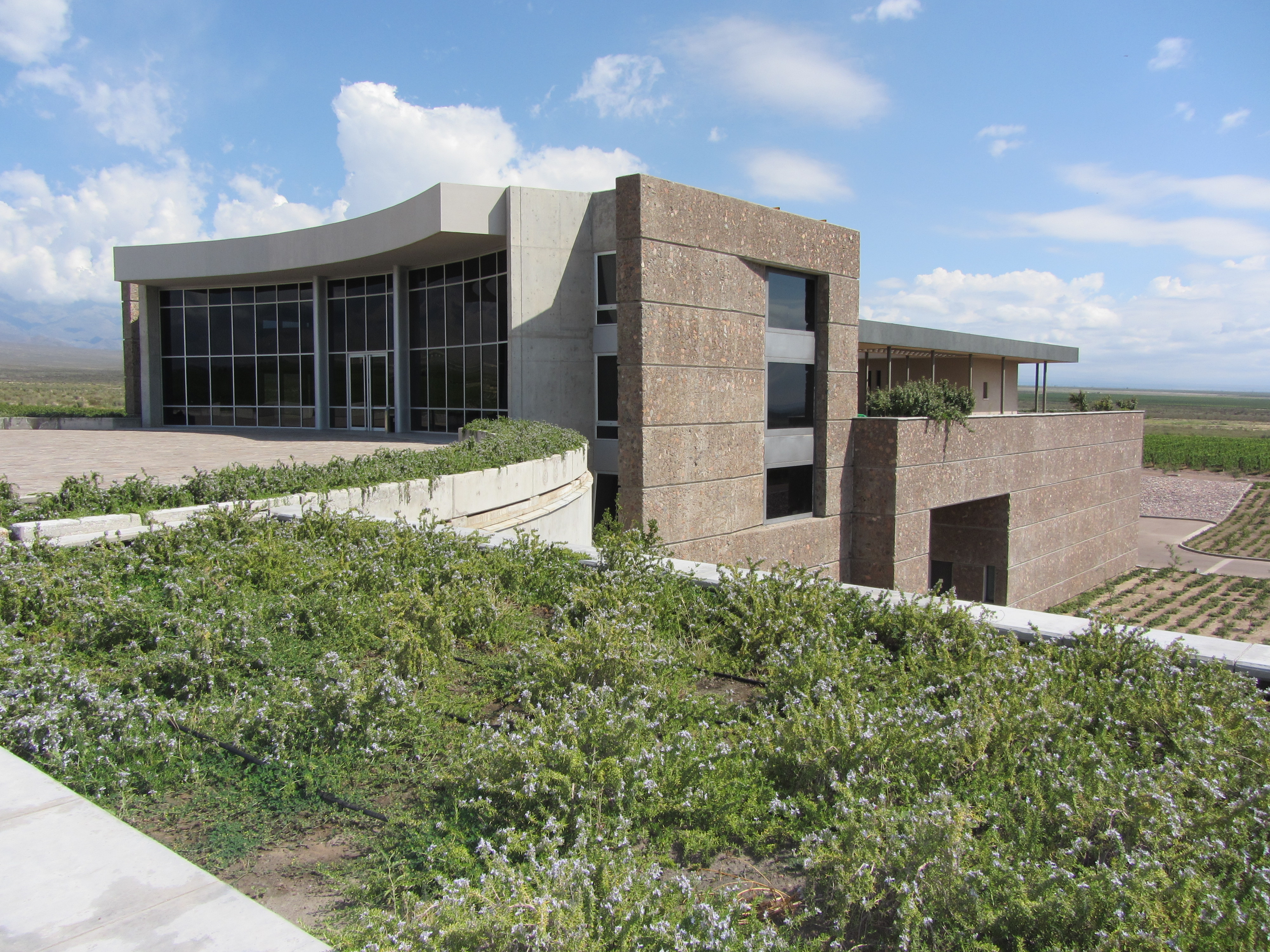
Bodega Diamandes vineyards, Valle de Uco, Mendoza Province, Argentina

- Bodega Atamisque / Capilla de la Gratitud
- Bodega Salentein, Mendoza
- Bodega Séptima, Mendoza
- Bodega Diamandes, Mendoza
- Bodega O Fournier, Mendoza
- Pulenta Estate
- Bodega Navarro Correas
- Killka Espacio Salentein

== Awards ==
- Premio Edificar, 2002, 2006, 2008, and 2010
- Order of the Star of Italian Solidarity, 2007
- ARQ Award, 2nd Prizes for Major Scale and Average Scale, 2010/2011
- Konex Award, 2012
- Illustrious citizen of the city of Mendoza, 2014
