= Inés Moisset =

Argentine architect

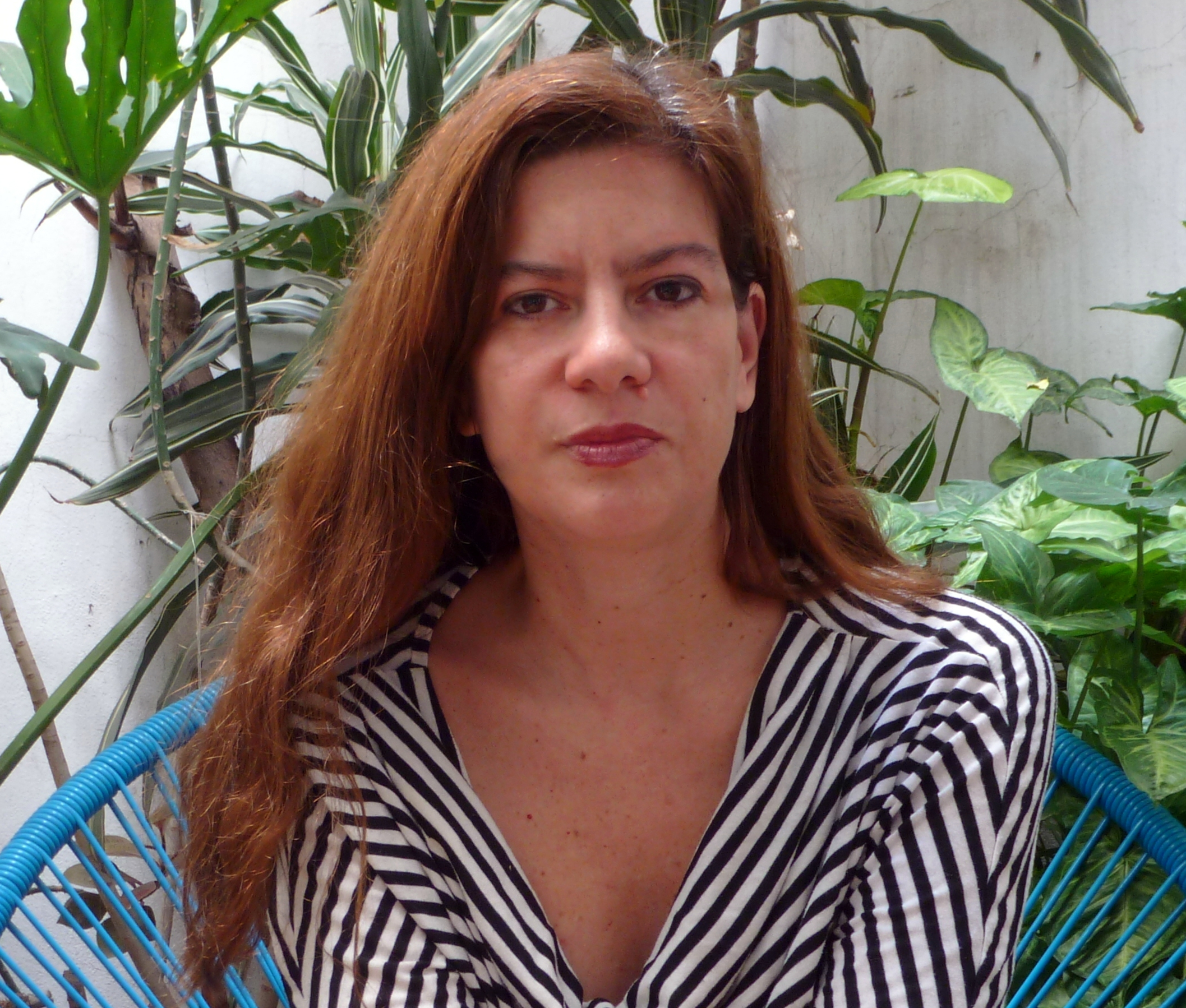
- Born: 24 June 1967 (age 58); Buenos Aires, Argentina
- Education: National University of Córdoba; Università Iuav di Venezia
- Occupation: Architect
- Employer: CONICET
- Parents: Daniel Moisset de Espanés (father); Noemí Goytia (mother)
- Awards: Bernardo Houssay Award (2003)
- Website: inesmoisset.com

Inés Moisset (born 24 June 1967) is an Argentine architect, known for her research into the theory and history of the discipline.

== Early life ==
Inés Moisset was born in Buenos Aires on 24 June 1967, the oldest of six children of architects Noemí Goytia and Daniel Moisset de Espanés. As a child, she was immersed in her parents' work, and she grew up among the various universities where her they carried out studies and research. In 1986, she entered the Faculty of Architecture, Urban Planning, and Design (FAUD) at the National University of Córdoba. In 1990, she became part of the founding team of the Catholic University of Córdoba's Design Institute, led by César Naselli.

== Research career ==
After finishing her studies in 1992, Moisset began working as a teacher in the subject Problem of Modernity in Latin America, along with Marina Waisman. She worked at the Togo Díaz studio until 1994. That year she joined the Marina Waisman Center for the training of researchers in History, Theory, and Criticism of Architecture at FAUD. In 1997, she was awarded a scholarship by the Argentine Ministry of Education to do her doctoral studies at the Dottorato di Ricerca in Composizione Architettonica, Università Iuav di Venezia, Italy. She completed these in 2000.

In 2002, Moisset entered the Scientific Researcher Program at the National Scientific and Technical Research Council (CONICET). In 2003, she received the Bernardo Houssay Young Researcher Award from Argentina's Ministry of Science, Technology and Productive Innovation. As of 2020, she is the only architect to receive this recognition.

In 2005, she became the head of the Master in Design of Innovative Processes program at the Catholic University of Córdoba's Faculty of Architecture. She has given lectures and seminars at conferences and universities, both in Argentina and abroad.

== Publications ==
Moisset has published numerous academic papers and articles in specialized magazines such as Quaderns d'Arquitectura i Urbanisme de España, Summa+, ARQ Clarín of Argentina, Vitruvius of Brazil, and Plataforma Arquitectura/ArchDaily.

Together with Omar Paris, she created the studio i+p (investigación + proyecto; Research + Project), with which she developed initiatives such as the Red Hipótesis de Paisaje (Hypothesis Landscape Network), responsible for international seminar workshops from 2001 to 2009. They specialized in the dissemination of Latin American architecture through book publishing and the periodical 30-60 cuaderno latinoamericano de arquitectura (30-60 Latin American Architecture Notebook) that they created in 2004. According to Spanish critic Josep Maria Montaner, the magazine "has managed to introduce the renewing gaze of young generations, becoming the best showcase for the diversity of context-sensitive Latin American architecture."

Moisset has published several books, both as author and co-author, such as Fractales y formas arquitectónicas (Fractals and Architectural Forms), and Togo Díaz, with Gueni Ojeda, in the ARQ Clarín Masters of Argentine Architecture collection.

She also publishes various websites related to the topics of her research: Fractales y arquitectura (Fractals and Architecture), Sembrar en el desierto (Sowing the Desert) together with Ismael Eyras, and Un día | una arquitecta (One Day | One Architect), together with Daniela Arias Laurino, Cecilia Kesman, Florencia Marciani, Gueni Ojeda, and Zaida Muxí.

== Awards and recognition ==
Moisset has been a juror in biennales of architecture such as the Ideas Competition in the Network of the Ibero-American Biennale of Architecture and Urbanism (Medellín, 2010), the Bolivian Biennale of Architecture (La Paz, 2012), and the Golden Hexagon Award (Lima, 2014). In 2014, she was a member of the selection committee of works for the Argentine contingent at the Ibero-American Biennale of Architecture and Urbanism. She had the role of Ambassador General at the 2016 Argentina International Architecture Biennale.

Her work was exhibited at the show On Stage! during 2014. The exhibition, which included works and projects by experts in the field of gender planning, was presented at the Vienna University of Technology, at the Higher Technical Architecture School of Valencia, and at the Leibniz University Hannover.

She is the coordinator of the collective Un día | una arquitecta, whose objective is to make the work of women in architecture visible, with repercussions in specialized and national and international interest media. Within this group, she has organized meetings such as Women and Architecture, inaugural event of the Biennial of Buenos Aires that took place at the Centro Cultural Recoleta in 2015, the so-called Un día | una arquitecta at the Design Museum, and at the Barcelona Pavilion.

Her research work has been recognized with awards, including:

- Bernardo Houssay Award, a distinction awarded by the Ministry of Science, Technology and Productive Innovation of Argentina, in the Young Researcher category, 2003
- Milka Bliznakov Research Prize, awarded by the International Archive of Women in Architecture based at Virginia Tech, 2016

For her work in the area of publication, she received an honorable mention at the 17th Quito Panamerican Biennale of Architecture for the 30-60 cuaderno latinoamericano de arquitectura collection.
