= Noemí Goytia =

Argentine architect and professor

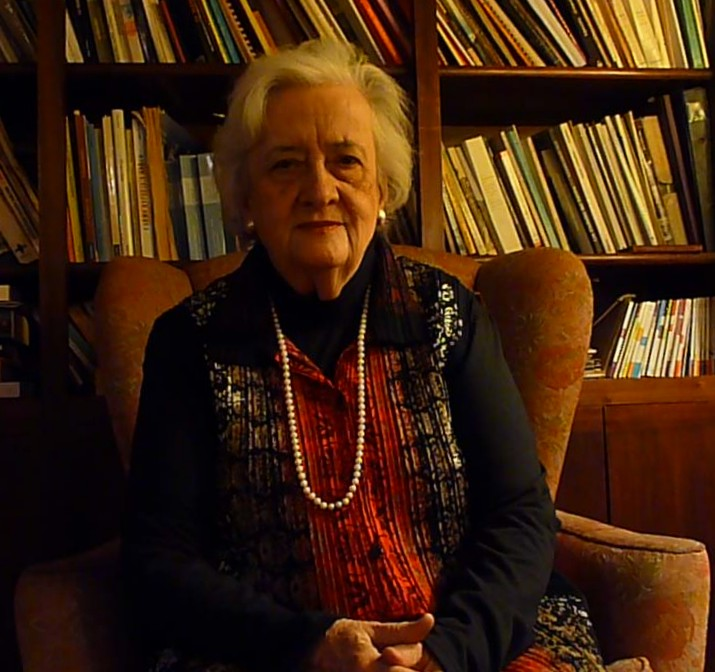
Noemí Goytia (2015)

Noemí Goytia (born 1936) is an Argentine architect and professor specialized in history, criticism, heritage and project processes. She has received the CICOP Lifetime Achievement Award from the International Center for Heritage Conservation in 2014. She is the author of numerous books and magazine articles on her specialty.

== Early life and education ==
Noemí Lucrecia Goytia was born in Salta in 1936. Her father was an engineer and her mother, a mathematics teacher. She lived in various Argentine cities besides Salta including Choele Choel and La Plata as a result of her father's profession. In 1955, due to her family transfer to Córdoba, she began her university studies there where she graduated from the Faculty of Architecture of the National University of Córdoba in 1963.

== Career ==
Goytia moved to Mendoza in 1964 where she was associate professor of History of Architecture V and VI of the Faculty of Architecture of the Universidad de Mendoza. There, she collaborated with Enrico Tedeschi in developing a direction for the new institution. At the same time that she was a professor in Mendoza, she maintained her relationship with the National University of Córdoba, serving as the head of practical work, from 1964 to 1968, in the area of Cultural Integration whose head was Marina Waisman.

In 1993, the Laboratory was established within the Chair of the History of Architecture, which Goytia directed between 1995 and 2005. It is an area created so that students interested in the relationship between history of architecture and design can study history in a different way. In 1996, together with Waisman, César Naselli and María Elena Foglia, Goytia established the center for the training of researchers in History and Criticism of Architecture at Faculty of Architecture and Urbanism of the National University of Córdoba (FAUD, UNC).

Her last position at FAUD, UNC was that of Professor of History of Architecture II, from 1991 to 2005. The focus of her teaching and her research included history as a tool for understanding context and as a design support, while also working on the processes, mechanisms and tools of the project.

Goytia has directed research projects funded by national and international science and technology organizations (CONICET, ALFA Program of the European Union, CEHOPU). She is the author of numerous specialized publications on the history of architecture, urban planning, heritage and design processes. Her books and articles are cited both by her peers and by professionals from other branches. She gives lectures and dissertations on architecture.

== Personal life ==
At the end of 1966, she married and returned permanently to Córdoba with her husband, Daniel Moisset de Espanés, also an architect and professor, with whom she shares research and publications. Goytia is the mother of the architect Inés Moisset.

== Awards ==
- 2014, CICOP Lifetime Achievement Award from the International Center for Heritage Conservation

== Books ==
She has published, among others:

- Goytia, Noemí (2013). «El arte de enseñar arquitectura». En Adagio, Noemí; Sella, Alejandra, eds. Enrico Tedeschi. Work in progress. Mendoza: Idearium. ISBN 978-950-624-041-7.
- Goytia, Noemí (2012). «Plan regulador de Córdoba (aprobado en 1962). Ernesto La Padula 1954-1956». En Méndez, Patricia, ed. Experiencias de urbanismo y planificación en la Argentina 1909–1955. Buenos Aires: Cedodal. pp. 207–210. ISBN 978-987-1033-42-3.
- Goytia, Noemí (2011). «Significado del aporte italiano a la identidad Argentina / Enrico Tedeschi. Un pionero en la enseñanza y el urbanismo de Argentina / Colonias Provinciales en Córdoba / Síntesis sobre los principales problemas. Caso testigo: las colonias agrícolas en la provincia de Córdoba / Un proyecto de trabajo conjunto. Escenarios y propuestas». En Ave, Gastone; de Menna, Emanuela, eds. Architettura e urbanistica di origine italiana in Argentina. Roma: Gangemi. ISBN 978-88-492-2031-5.
- Goytia, Noemí, ed. (2006). Cuando el patrimonio se convierte en fuente de revitalización. Córdoba: FAUD.UNC. ISBN 978-950-33-0606-2.
- Goytia, Noemi; Moisset de Espanes, Daniel (2003). La alta tecnología de un mundo en Desarrollo: Eladio Dieste. Valencia: Ediciones Generales de la Construcción. ISBN 978-84-933044-7-8.
- Goytia, Noemí; Moisset, Daniel (2002). Diseñar con la estructura. Córdoba: Ingreso. ISBN 978-987-43-4590-5.
- Goytia, Noemí (1998). Cuando la idea se construye. Procesos de diseño de arquitectos de los siglos XIX y XX. Córdoba: Screen. ISBN 978-987-96970-4-7.
- Foglia, María Elena; Goytia, Noemí (1998). Rehabilitación y desarrollo de poblados históricos. Córdoba: Ingreso. ISBN 978-950-33-0191-3.
- Foglia, María Elena; Goytia, Noemí; et al. (1994). La cuadrícula en el trazado de la ciudad latinoamericana. El Caso Córdoba: 1810–1916. Córdoba: FAUD.UNC.
- Foglia, María Elena; Goytia, Noemí (1993). Los poblados históricos del norte cordobés. Córdoba: Secretaría de Turismo de la Provincia.
- Foglia, María Elena; Goytia, Noemí (1990). Procesos de Modernización en Córdoba. Córdoba: FAUD.UNC.
- Foglia, María Elena; Goytia, Noemí; et al. (1987). La cuadrícula en el desarrollo de la ciudad hispanoamericana. El caso Córdoba. 1573 - 1810. Córdoba. FAUD. UNC.
