= Moisset =

Moisset is a surname. Notable people with the surname include:

- Inés Moisset (born 1967), Argentine architect
- Maurice Moisset (1860–1946), French marine and landscape painter
