= Lotito =

Lotito is a surname. Notable people with the surname include:

- Claudio Lotito (born 1957), Italian entrepreneur
- Frank Lotito (born 1971), Australian actor, comedian, film director, and film producer
- Lawrence Lotito (1921–2004), American business owner, meteorologist, and Air Force officer
- Michel Lotito (1950–2007), French entertainer
- Cataldo Lotito Quercia (1938–2003), Italian, Venezuelan businessman
