= Ebba Atterbom =

Swedish translator and educator

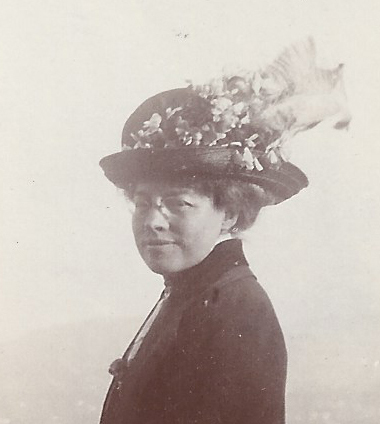
- Ebba Atterbom in 1914
- Born: Ebba Gustava Augusta Atterbom; 19 January 1868; Gryt, Sweden
- Died: 23 August 1961 (aged 93); Gothenburg, Sweden
- Occupations: Translator; educator

Ebba Gustava Augusta Atterbom (19 January 1868 – 23 August 1961) was a Swedish translator and educator. She was the first person to translate the work of Irish novelist James Joyce into Swedish. In 1959, she was awarded the Order of the Star of Italian Solidarity in recognition of her contributions in Italian to the literature of Sweden.

== Life ==
Ebba Atterbom was born on 19 January 1868 in Gryt in Södermanland County, Sweden. She was the second of the seven children to Augusta (née Tigerschiöld) and Ernst Atterbom, an army officer and engineer. Her father was the son of poet Per Daniel Amadeus Atterbom. In 1879, the family moved to Gothenburg where Ebba and her sisters attended the Nya Elementarläroverket för flickor. Atterbom became close friends with Sophie Elkan, and subsequently with Selma Lagerlöf. In the 1890s, she visited Florence, where she mastered Italian and started giving lessons in the language. She started translating works of Sophie Elkan, Helena Nyblom, Anna Tengström, and Per Hallström to Italian. In 1907, she moved with her father to Kungälv. In 1925, she co-founded the Svensk-italienska Föreningen (the Swedish-Italian Association) in Gothenburg, and she served as the vice-secretary for several decades. From 1928, she taught Italian language studies at the University of Gothenburg.

From about 1927, Atterbom established herself as a translator. Apart from translating from Italian, she also translated works in English, Norwegian, and Danish to Swedish. Her translated works from English included works by H. G. Wells, Edith Wharton, and James Joyce. In 1921, she translated Joyce's A Portrait of the Artist as a Young Man. Among her translations from Italian was Andrea Palladio's I quattro libri dell'architettura. She translated 100 lektioner i italienska from Danish. After the death of her father in 1937, she returned to Gothenburg and continued teaching language studies. In 1959, she was awarded the Order of the Star of Italian Solidarity in recognition of her contributions in Italian to the literature of Sweden.

Atterbom died in Gothenburg, on 23 August 1961.
