= Serge Dumont =

French businessperson

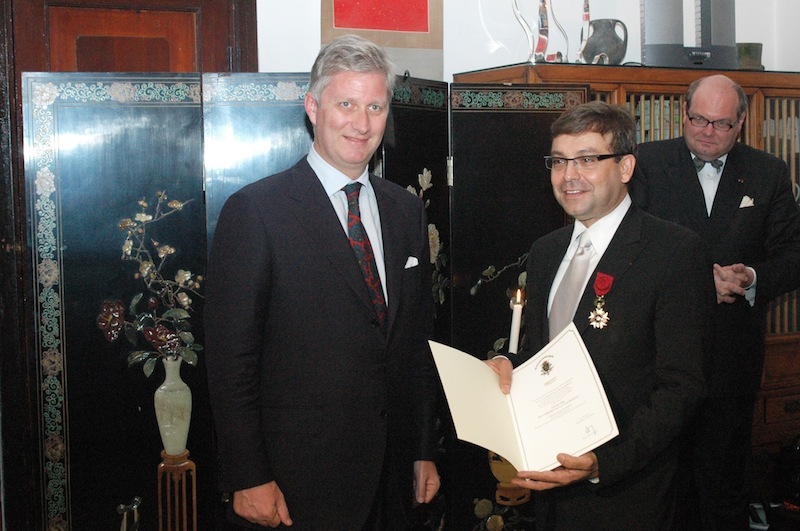
- Serge Dumont Awarded Officer of the Order of the Crown of Belgium
- Occupations: Entrepreneur, business executive, philanthropist

Serge Dumont is a global entrepreneur, business executive, and philanthropist. He is one of the pioneers in China’s corporate and marketing communications industry. From 2006 to 2018, he served as Omnicom Group Vice Chairman and Chairman, Asia Pacific.

Dumont serves on various corporate and philanthropic boards in the United States.

== Career and early life ==
Dumont graduated from the Sorbonne University in Paris, France. He holds dual degrees in sociology and oriental languages and civilizations, and has studied at the Taiwan Normal University and the Political Institute in Taipei.

In 1985, he moved to Hong Kong and Beijing and established China’s first corporate communications and public affairs consultancy, Interasia. The company acquired a roster of Fortune 500 clients and became a market leader in Asia, helping multinational companies like Procter & Gamble launch their brands in the region. He became known for introducing Western brands to the Asian market, organizing corporate events like Richemont’s "Watches and Wonders” in the Forbidden City and Fendi’s catwalk show at the Great Wall. Dumont is "credited with pioneering the industry there from its infancy to today’s sophisticated business sector.”

In 1993, Dumont sold Interasia to the world's largest public relations company, Edelman. At Edelman, he was appointed Executive Vice President and President of Asia, and served on the Global Board. Dumont helped establish Edelman China as the country’s top agency.

From 1998 to 2006, Dumont concentrated on private equity and merger & acquisition activities, as well as strategic advisory and philanthropic work. In 2006, he joined Omnicom Group and in 2011 was appointed Vice Chairman of the Omnicom Group and Chairman, Asia Pacific, managing the portfolio of companies owned by Omnicom and helping spearhead Omnicom’s strategic expansion in Asia. One of his key responsibilities was directly managing the fast-growing Greater China business unit by developing business strategies for all Omnicom activities and building relationships that expanded the group’s operational footprint globally. Dumont reported to John Wren, the Chairman and CEO of Omnicom, who credited him for making a “major contribution to building [Omnicom’s] capabilities and reach.” Dumont was also involved with training and education at Omnicom, in addition to diversity and inclusion initiatives.

In 2018, Dumont left Omnicom to focus on philanthropic and investment activities.

== Advisory work and philanthropic activities ==
Dumont has been involved in philanthropic and government advisory work in the areas of education and public health. He claims "impactful philanthropy and investment" is his “core interest.”

Dumont has served on several boards, including Asia Society, Synergos, and Tsinghua University School of Journalism and Communications. He has been a longtime member of the Global Philanthropists Circle, a global network for philanthropists to collaborate with and learn from their peers.

Dumont established the Serge Dumont Fund, which administers fellowships and internships for communications professionals: In 2004, with Tsinghua University's School of Journalism and Communications, Dumont founded the first scholarship fund aimed at developing qualified professionals for the marketing communications industry. He has also set up partnership programs with Fudan University and the China European International Business School (CEIBS).

In 2006, Dumont was named a Special Representative for UNAIDS, the joint United Nations Program on HIV/AIDS. He led a team of experts who advised the Beijing Municipal Government and the World Health Organization during the SARS crisis of 2003. Dumont also served as Conseiller du Commerce Extérieur de la France (France’s Foreign Trade Advisor).

Since 2013, Dumont has been a jury member and, in 2015, became a nominating committee member of the Prince’s Prize for Innovative Philanthropy, a global initiative of the Prince Albert II of Monaco Foundation and the Paris-based Tocqueville Foundation. In 2019, he was invited to serve on the jury of the David Rockefeller Bridging Leadership Award.

== Publications ==
In 2003, Dumont co-authored Brand Warriors China, the first book to analyze the brand strategies of the top Chinese companies expanding internationally. It features interviews with CEOs and other leaders.

== Honors and awards ==
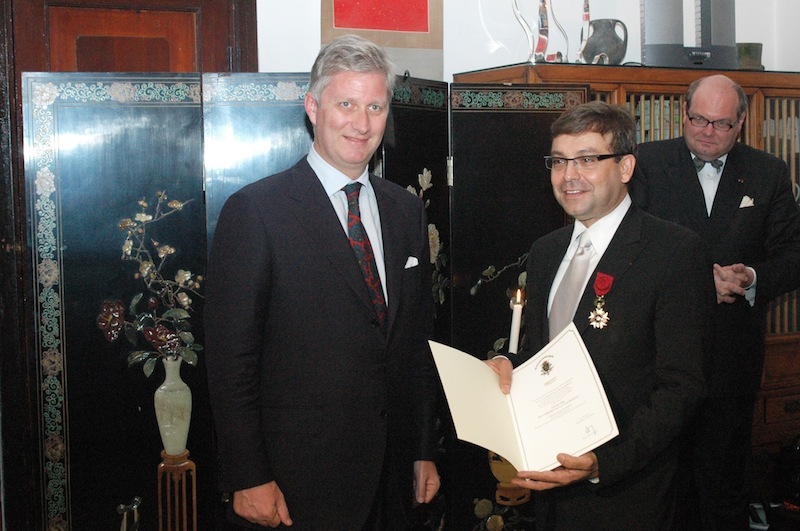
HRH Crown Prince Philippe of Belgium makes Serge Dumont an Officer of the Order of the Crown.

Dumont's contribution to society has been recognized through honors and awards from a number of national governments and international organizations. In 2008, he received a Gold Medal from UNAIDS for "outstanding contributions to the AIDS response." In 2011, Dumont received the Holmes Report’s Asia-Pacific Lifetime Achievement Sabre Award for Outstanding Individual Achievement. In 2014, he was honored by the China Advertising Association for outstanding contributions to the advertising Industry. In 2015, Dumont was named by Debrett's as one of the top 100 most influential people in Hong Kong. In 2016, he received an Outstanding Merit Award on the occasion of the APAC Cristal Awards.

National honors and awards include the following:

- France
  - Légion d’Honneur (Legion of Honor)
  - Chevalier des Palmes Académiques (Knight in the Order of Academic Palms)
  - Officier des Arts et Lettres (Officer of Arts and Letters)
  - Chevalier du Mérite Agricole (Knight, National Order of Agricultural Merit)
- Belgium: Officer of the Order of the Crown of Belgium
- Italy: Grand Officer, Stella della Solidarieta Italiana (Grand Officer of the Star of Italian Solidarity).
- Morocco: Officer of the Ouissam Alaouite (Royal Order of Al-Alaoui, Kingdom of Morocco)

== Personal life ==
Dumont is fluent in English, French, and Mandarin.
