= Order of the Star of Italian Solidarity =

Civil decoration of the Italian Republic

- Insignia of a Grand Officer of the Star of Italian Solidarity
- Type: National Order
- Established: 27 January 1947
- Eligibility: Expatriates and foreign nationals
- Status: Extant
- Grades: Grand Officer; Commander; Member

Precedence
- Next (higher): Order of Merit for Labour
- Next (lower): Order of Vittorio Veneto

The Order of the Star of Italian Solidarity (Italian: Stella della solidarietà italiana [ˈstella della solidarjeˈta itaˈljaːna]) was founded as a national order by the first President of the Italian Republic, Enrico De Nicola, in 1947, to recognise civilian and military expatriates or foreigners who made an outstanding contribution to the reconstruction of Italy after World War II.

In 2011, the order was reformed as the Order of the Star of Italy by the 11th President, Giorgio Napolitano. The emphasis of the reformed award was shifted from post-war reconstruction to the preservation and promotion of national prestige abroad, promoting friendly relations and co-operation with other countries and ties with Italy.

== Order of the Star of Italian Solidarity (1947–2011) ==
The insignia, modified in 2001, bore the inscription Solidarietà Italiana encircling a depiction of the Good Samaritan. The order was bestowed by decree of the President of the Republic, head of the order, on the recommendation of the Minister of Foreign Affairs.

The three degrees with corresponding ribbons were as follows:

Ribbon (1947–2001)	Ribbon (2001–2011)	Class (English)	Full title in Italian	Awards (as of December 2006)
		1st Class / Grand Officer	Grande Ufficiale dell'Ordine della Stella della solidarietà italiana	643
		2nd Class / Commander	Commendatore dell'Ordine della Stella della solidarietà italiana	3,415
		3rd Class / Member	Membro dell'Ordine della Stella della solidarietà italiana	6,507

The Order of the Star of Italian Solidarity was worn as follows:

Ribbon
Member	Commander	Grand Officer
Member	Commander	Grand Officer

== Recipients ==
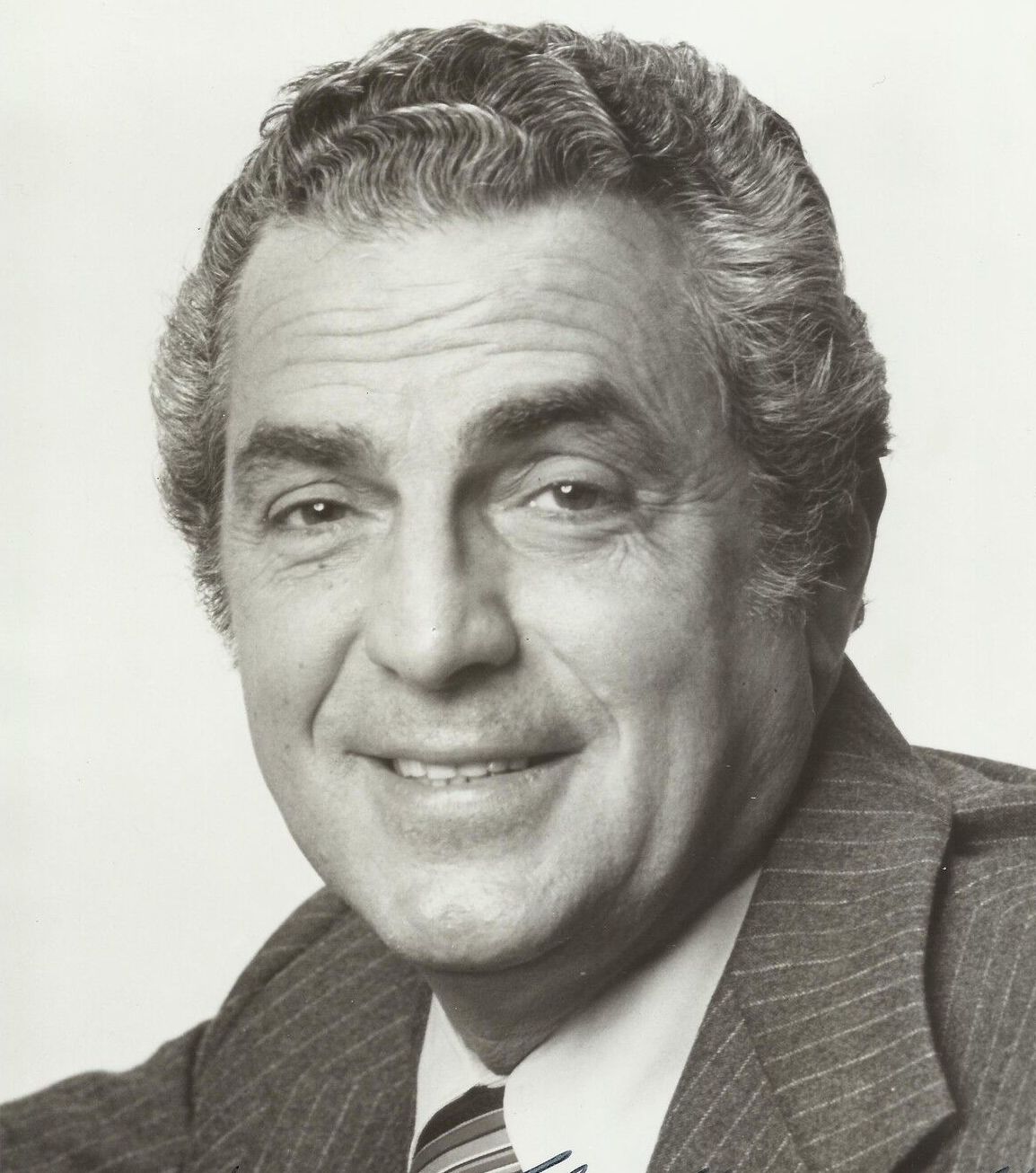
Mario Biaggi

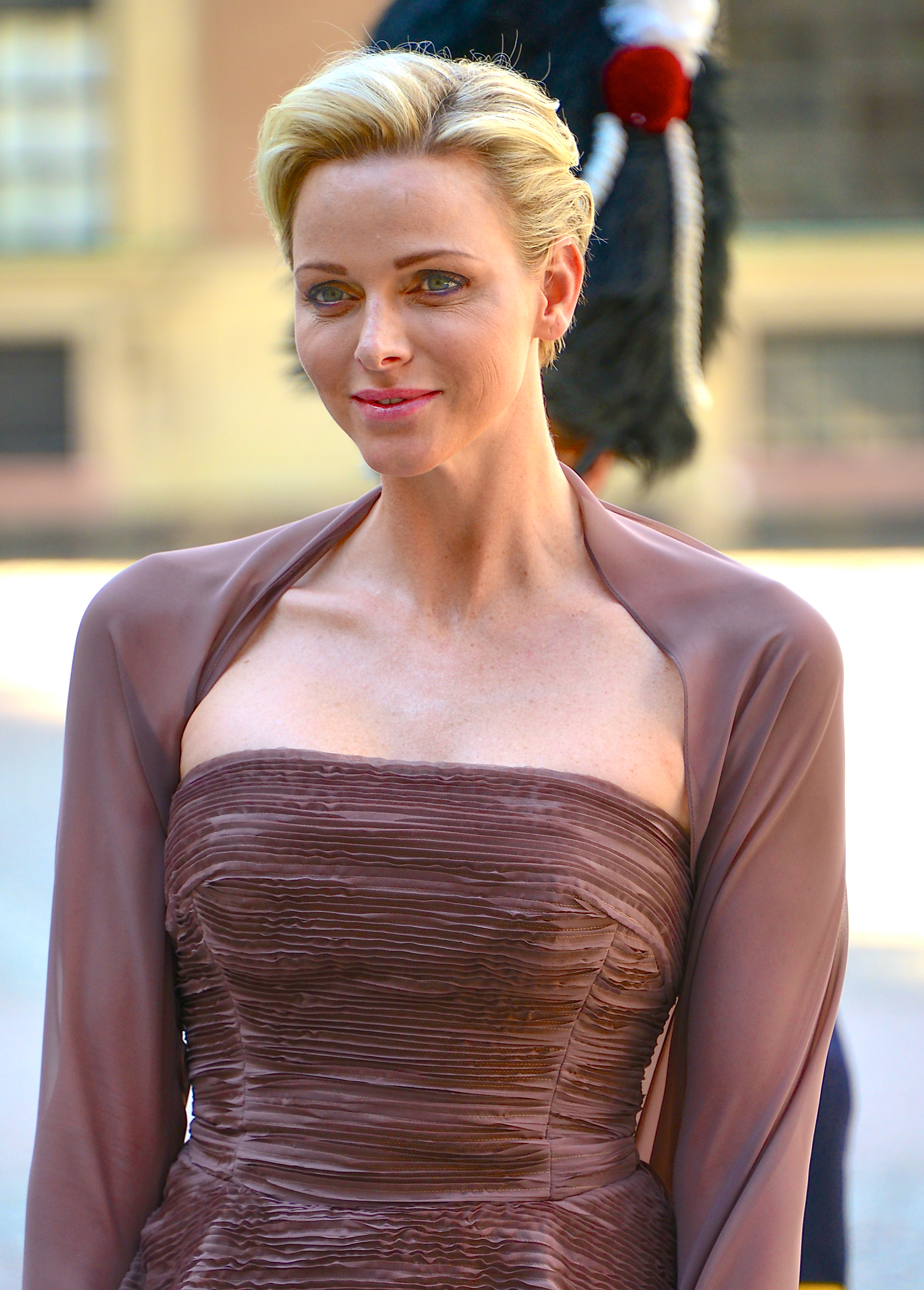
Charlene, Princess of Monaco

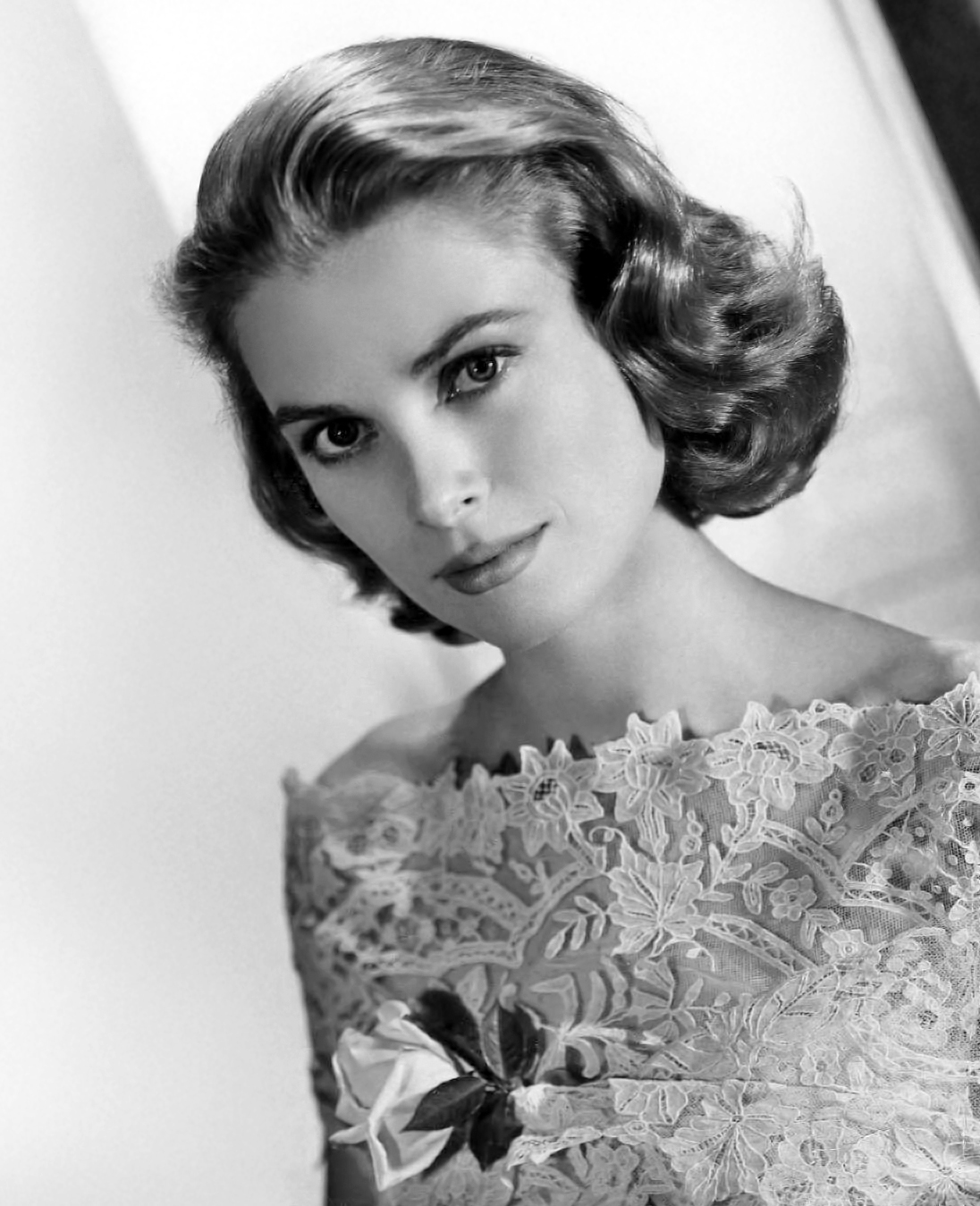
Grace Kelly

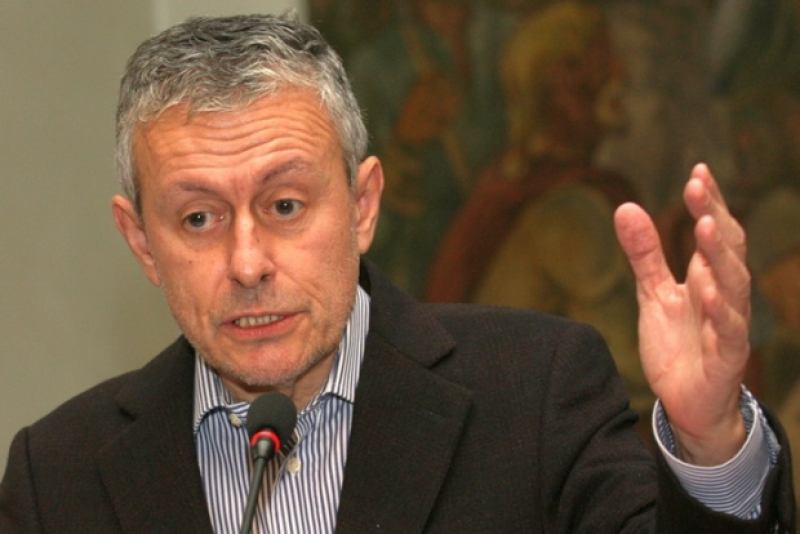
Solomon Passy

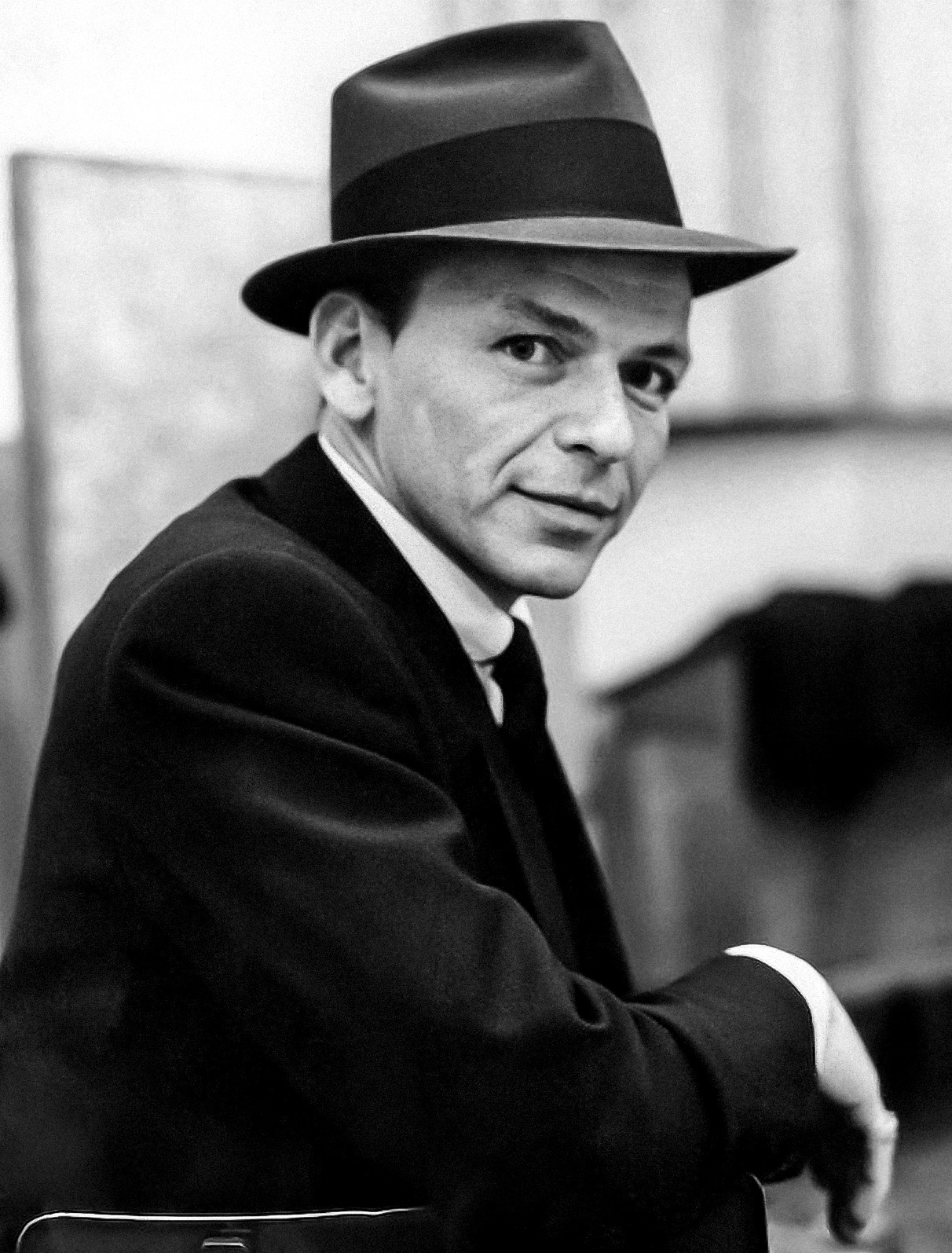
Frank Sinatra

- Howard B. Adelmann
- Guido D´Alessandro Lombardi
- Carlo Ancelotti
- Francesco Calabro
- Ebba Atterbom
- Teodor Baconschi
- Mario Biaggi
- Boyko Borisov
- Eliana Bórmida
- Everett Francis Briggs
- Paata Burchuladze
- John Burland
- Charlene, Princess of Monaco
- Carlo Azeglio Ciampi
- Domenick Cocco
- Francesco Cossiga
- Matilda Cuomo
- Ritu Dalmia
- Dan Daniel
- Jatin Das
- James del Piano
- John Dickie
- Serge Dumont
- Moira Lenore Dynon - June 5, 1967
- Irena Eris
- Bernard Evans
- Linda Fabiani
- Genevieve Fiore
- Foster Furcolo
- Gaetano Gagliano
- Wolfgang Haas
- Marcella Hazan
- Grace Kelly
- S. S. Kumar
- Anthony Lacavera
- Gabriel Liiceanu
- Lawrence Lotito
- Fabio Luisi
- Yuri Lyubimov
- Mauricio Macri
- Henry Mavrodin
- Íñigo Méndez de Vigo
- Amina Mohamed
- Manuel Monteiro de Castro
- Khaldoon Al Mubarak
- Hidetoshi Nakata
- Mariana Nicolesco
- Andrei Oișteanu
- George Paciullo
- Costanza Pascolato
- Solomon Passy
- Michel Pastor
- Drew Pearson
- Andrei Pleșu
- Victor Ponta
- Robert D. Putnam
- Silvio Scionti
- Giovanni Scognamillo
- Shim Hwa-jin
- Fatih Terim
- Andriy Shevchenko
- Frank Sinatra
- James S. Snyder
- Elisabeth Söderström
- George Sperti
- Jean Tennyson
- Alfa Tofft
- Zeynep Karahan Uslu
- Radu Varia

== See also ==
- List of Italian orders of knighthood
- Order of the Crown of Italy
