= Genevieve Fiore =

American women's rights and peace activist (1912–2002)

- Colorado Woman of Achievement, 1967
- Born: Genevieve Natalina D’Amato; January 20, 1912; Sunrise, Wyoming
- Died: March 10, 2002 (aged 90); Denver, Colorado
- Occupations: Peace activist, women's rights activist
- Years active: 1947-2002
- Known for: Founding the UNESCO office of Denver

Genevieve Fiore (1912–2002) was an American women's rights and peace activist, who was the founder, and served as the executive director, of the Colorado Division of United Nations Educational, Scientific and Cultural Organization (UNESCO). Her UNESCO Club was founded in the year the clubs were first conceived and was the third organization established in the world. In 1967 she was honored as one of the inductees for the Colorado Women of Achievement Award. She was knighted by Italy in 1975 receiving the rank of Cavaliere dell'Ordine della Stella d'Italia. In 1991, she was inducted into the Colorado Women's Hall of Fame for her many years of peace activism and work with women's rights issues.

== Early life ==
Genevieve Natalina D’Amato was born January 20, 1912, in Sunrise, Wyoming, to Italian immigrants, Lorenzo and Anna D'Amato. Her parents had immigrated to the United States in 1908 from Petina, Italy. Her father was a miner, who taught himself blacksmithing and in 1919, moved with his family to Welby, Colorado. Initially, D'Amato attended a Catholic parochial school, but when she learned the school was not accredited, she campaigned for the Adams County School Board to allow she and her brother to attend a school outside of their district. The Board eventually paid half of the children's tuition and allowed them to attend Union High School #1, where they were ostracized as the first Italians in the school. D'Amato worked to overcome the stereotyping of her classmates and became senior class president and the salutatorian of her class. Her graduation with honors enabled D'Amato to earn a tuition waiver scholarship at the University of Colorado, but as her family could not afford her room and board, she did not accept the scholarship. On June 25, 1933, D'Amato married the printer John R. Fiore and they subsequently had three children: David, Phillip Dominic and Roxanna.

== Community service ==
Having experienced personal discrimination, and losses of family members in both World War I and World War II, Fiore was passionate about creating a world focused on peace and tolerance. From the formation of the Steele Community Center in north Denver in 1937, Fiore worked as a volunteer. While serving as a board member of the Steele Center in 1947, Fiore learned that Denver was to host a regional United Nations Educational, Scientific and Cultural Organization (UNESCO) conference. The first UNESCO Club had been established a few months earlier by Koichi Ueda in Japan. Using the center’s registration, she attended the conference as an official observer and collected literature at the event to begin a UN library. She founded a UNESCO group at the Steele Center, though she initially had trouble getting others to support her pacifist views. When no one else would accept the chairmanship, Fiore took the role, planning to hire an executive director. The founding of the organization in 1947, marked only the third UNESCO club in the world, preceded by Ueda's group in Sendai and one founded in Kyoto. Urged to stay on and supported by family members Fiore became the executive director and worked an average of 70 hours per week as a volunteer.

Through a school adoption program, Fiore and her club members provided clothing and school supplies to a school in Siculiana, Sicily as their first project and a few months later, adopted a school on the outskirts of Athens. Fiore presented programs on radio and television, at schools and organizations, discussing UNESCO’s projects and relief programs. Her presentations, totaling over 4,000, included her being on agendas with governors, congressmen, government officials, and businesswomen, urging international goodwill and cooperation. She traveled throughout the state, and attended conferences in New York City, as well as internationally, including British Columbia, Canada; Italy; Japan; and Mexico. In 1953, Fiore helped create Il Circolo Italiano (The Italian Circle) to promote friendship and understanding for the Italian-American community of Denver. The organization offered free Italian lessons. In 1955, she became a supporter of Japan's Peace Pole Project and in 1984 attended the World Federation of UNESCO Clubs, Centres and Associations (WFUCA) World Congress, held in Sendai.

Until 1959, the Denver UNESCO organization was operated out of the Fiore family's basement. In that year, she moved the office and International Hospitality Center to the Denver International House and continued as executive director for another fourteen years. Fiore retired in 1974, but she continued her involvement with the International Hospitality Center, hosting foreign visitors and encouraging others to participate. She also attended the International Women's Conference and Tribunal held in Mexico City in 1975. The tribunal was a non-governmental meeting, while the conference was the official government meeting. Both sessions were held at the same meeting so that delegates participated in discussions on official policy and program implementation to improve women's educational opportunities, equality, economic position and collaboration. The 1975 UN World Conference on Women, which was part of the International Women's Year focus, was a precursor in the development of the provisions of Convention on the Elimination of All Forms of Discrimination Against Women (CEDAW). Fiore felt invigorated by the experience and pledged to continue to work for women's empowerment.

In 1977, Fiore chaired the Colorado Women’s Conference plan of action committee and received top votes to go as the state delegate to the National Women’s Conference in Houston. In 1979, she established the Genevieve Fiore Educational Trust Fund which provides awards annually to high school students who write essays about the United Nations. In 1983, the United States withdrew its UNESCO membership, citing mismanagement of funds, but Fiore argued for Denver's group, which had never utilized government funds, to continue its independent status. Her campaign was successful and in 1986, the organization changed its name to the UNESCO Association of Colorado. In 1994, Fiore began producing and hosting a weekly radio program called "Focus International", which examined international educational projects and UNESCO initiatives. Fiore died March 10, 2002, in Denver and was buried in Mount Olivet Cemetery.

== Awards and honors ==
In 1967 Fiore was honored as one of the inductees for the 1966 Colorado Women of Achievement Award along with Elizabeth McAulliffe Calabrese and Sabina O’Malley. She was recognized nationally when she received the Freedoms Foundation's George Washington Medal and received the international Michelangelo Medal from UNESCO. On 15 October 1975, she was knighted by Italy receiving the Order of the Star of Italian Solidarity. She was inducted into the Colorado Women's Hall of Fame in 1991.

== See also ==
- List of peace activists
