= Alejandro C. Frery =

Computational statistician & remote sensing scientist

Alejandro C. Frery IEEE Fellow
- Born: February 21, 1960 (age 66); Mendoza, Argentina
- Education: Universidad de Mendoza
- Known for: SAR/PolSAR image analysis, Information theory in remote sensing
- Awards: IEEE GRSS Regional Leader (2018)
- Scientific career
- Fields: Computational statistics, Signal processing, Remote sensing
- Workplaces: Victoria University of Wellington; Federal University of Alagoas; Federal University of Pernambuco; INPE
- Website: people.wgtn.ac.nz/alejandro.frery

Alejandro C. Frery (born 21 February 1960) is an Argentine-born computational statistician and image processing expert. He is a full professor of Statistics and Data Science at the School of Mathematics and Statistics, Victoria University of Wellington, New Zealand. His research focuses on statistical computing, stochastic modeling, and the analysis of synthetic aperture radar (SAR) and polarimetric SAR (PolSAR) imagery.

== Early life and education ==
Frery was born in Mendoza, Argentina, in 1960. He received a B.Sc. in Electronic and Electrical Engineering from Universidad de Mendoza in 1983. M.Sc. degree in Applied Mathematics (Statistics) from the Instituto de Matemática Pura e Aplicada in 1990. Ph.D. degree in Applied Computing from the Instituto Nacional de Pesquisas Espaciais, São José dos Campos, Brazil, in 1993.

== Research and contributions ==
Frery's research intersects computational statistics and image processing, with significant work in:

- Statistical modeling of SAR/PolSAR data
- Entropy and complexity measures in remote sensing
- Information-theoretic image classification
- Image filtering and clustering in remote sensing application

== Honors and roles ==
- IEEE GRSS Distinguished Lecturer (2015)
- Editor-in-Chief of the IEEE Geoscience and Remote Sensing (2014-2018)
- Huashan Scholar at Xidian University, Xi’an, China (2019-2020)
- IEEE Fellow (2025)

== Selected publications ==
- Frery, Alejandro C.; Wu, Jie; Gomez, Luis (20 July 2022). SAR Image Analysis - A Computational Statistics Approach: With R Code, Data, and Applications. John Wiley & Sons. ISBN 978-1-119-79546-9.
