= Moira Lenore Dynon =

Australian chemist and activist (1920–1976)

- Born: 4 September 1920
- Died: 23 October 1976 (aged 56)
- Occupations: Chemist and community activist

Moira Lenore Dynon (née Shelton; 4 September 1920 – 23 October 1976) was an Australian chemist and community activist.

The daughter of Percy Shelton and Lily Johnston, she was born Moira Lenore Shelton in Elsternwick and was educated there, in Toorak and at the University of Melbourne, where she received a BSc in 1941. She joined the Women's Auxiliary Australian Air Force, where she was responsible for inspection, management and training in the use of chemical weapons. After returning to civilian life, she worked in research for the Commonwealth Serum Laboratories and then for the Council for Scientific and Industrial Research.

She married John Dynon in 1950; the couple had five children. In 1960, she organized a campaign to provide high school education for Japanese children fathered by Australian servicemen. From 1961 to 1967, she was president of the women's division of the Italo-Australian Welfare Association. She was chair of the Aid for India campaign and later served as president of Aid India. She was also involved in various campaigns for famine relief in south Asia. In 1967, she was appointed Knight of the Order of the Star of Italian Solidarity.

Dynon died of cancer in Malvern at the age of 56.
