= Costanza Pascolato =

Brazilian entrepreneur and fashion specialist

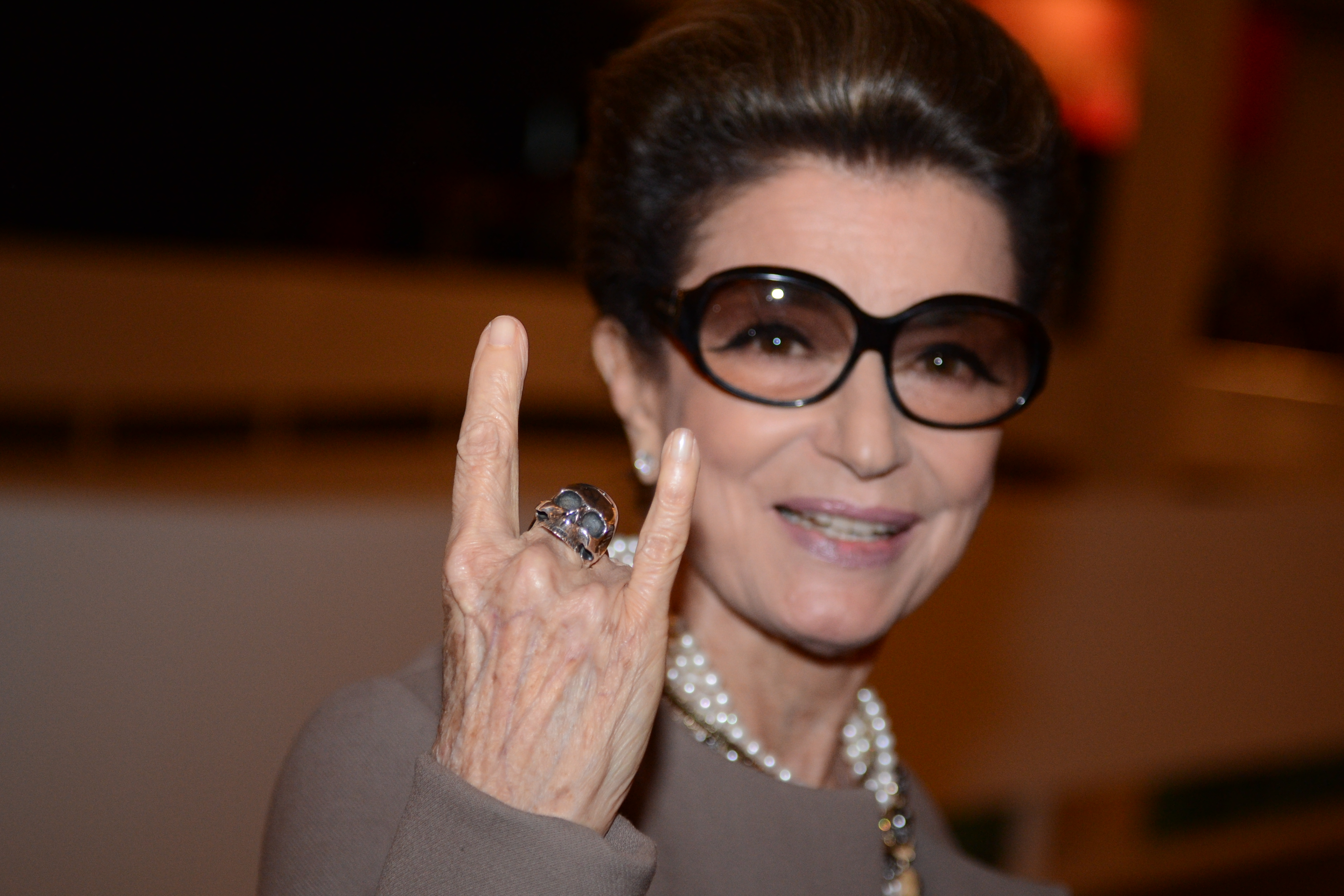
- Pascolato in 2011
- Born: Costanza Maria Teresa Ida Clotilde Giuseppina Pallavicini Pascolato; 19 September 1939 (age 86); Siena, Tuscany, Italy
- Occupations: Fashion specialist; textile entrepreneur
- Spouse(s): 1. Robert Blocker, 1962-1971 (divorced); 2. Giulio Cattaneo della Volta, 1975-1990 (deceased); 3. Nelson Motta, 199?-2001 (divorced)

Costanza Pascolato (born 19 September 1939) is an Italian-Brazilian businesswoman and fashion consultant, considered to be one of the most influential names in fashion in Brazil.

== Early life ==
Costanza Maria Teresa Ida Clotilde Giuseppina Pallavicini Pascolato was born in Siena, in the Italian region of Tuscany on 19 September 1939. She moved to Brazil at the age of five as a result of her parents' decision to leave Italy towards the end of World War II, following the overthrow of Benito Mussolini’s fascist government, in which her father had played a role. In Brazil they were hosted by Ciccillo Matarazzo and other members of the Italo-Brazilian Matarazzo family. In 1948, her parents, who had an aristocratic background, founded a textile factory. At the age of 15, Pascolato was a South American diving champion. After completing high school, she did not go to university but became an assistant to artists such as Clóvis Graciano.

== Marriages ==
In 1962, Pascolato married banker Robert Blocker, a Brazilian son of Americans. Together they had two daughters, Consuelo and Alessandra. They separated in 1971. After the separation, she began her career as an editor and fashion consultant at the magazine Claudia, where she worked for 17 years. In 1975, she married her second husband, the Italian Marquis Giulio Cattaneo della Volta. This relationship led to her being disinherited by her father. She lived with Della Volta until his death from a heart attack in December 1990. In the same year, Pascolato experienced depression and breast cancer. Her third marriage, to music producer Nelson Motta, ended in 2001, after seven years.

== Entrepreneurship and writing ==
When her father died in 1987, Pascolato took over his company and turned it into one of the largest Brazilian textile companies, which continues to supply fabrics to the country's top fashion stylists. In 1988, she ceased working for Claudia, began writing a fashion column for the Folha de S.Paulo newspaper and opened a fashion consulting company. She later joined the Vogue magazine team. She was also involved as a creative consultant in the design of an H. Stern jewellery collection.

In 2008, Pascolato was made a Commander of the Order of the Star of Italian Solidarity by the Italian government. An ever-present figure in the media, she is recognized as a leading authority on fashion in Brazil. She has written three books: O Essencial (1999), giving tips on fashion and style; Confidencial – Segredos de Moda, Estilo and Bem-Viver (Confidential – Secrets of Fashion, Style and Living Well - 2009); and Meu Caderno de Estampas (My Book of Prints - 2015), which reproduces prints of designs by her company, Santaconstancia. With Milly Lacombe, she wrote Como Ser uma Modelo de Sucesso (How to be a successful model) in 2003. In March 2013 she launched a blog, featuring up-to-date fashion news and features on special projects. In April 2014, she and her friend, artist Marilu Beer, started a season of sofa-chat-shows shown on YouTube, called Costanza & Marilu. In November 2014, the series was moved to television. In December 2014, she was named as one of the 50 most "stylish" Brazilians in fashion. As of 2021, she had 660,000 followers on Instagram.
