= S. S. Kumar =

S S Kumar
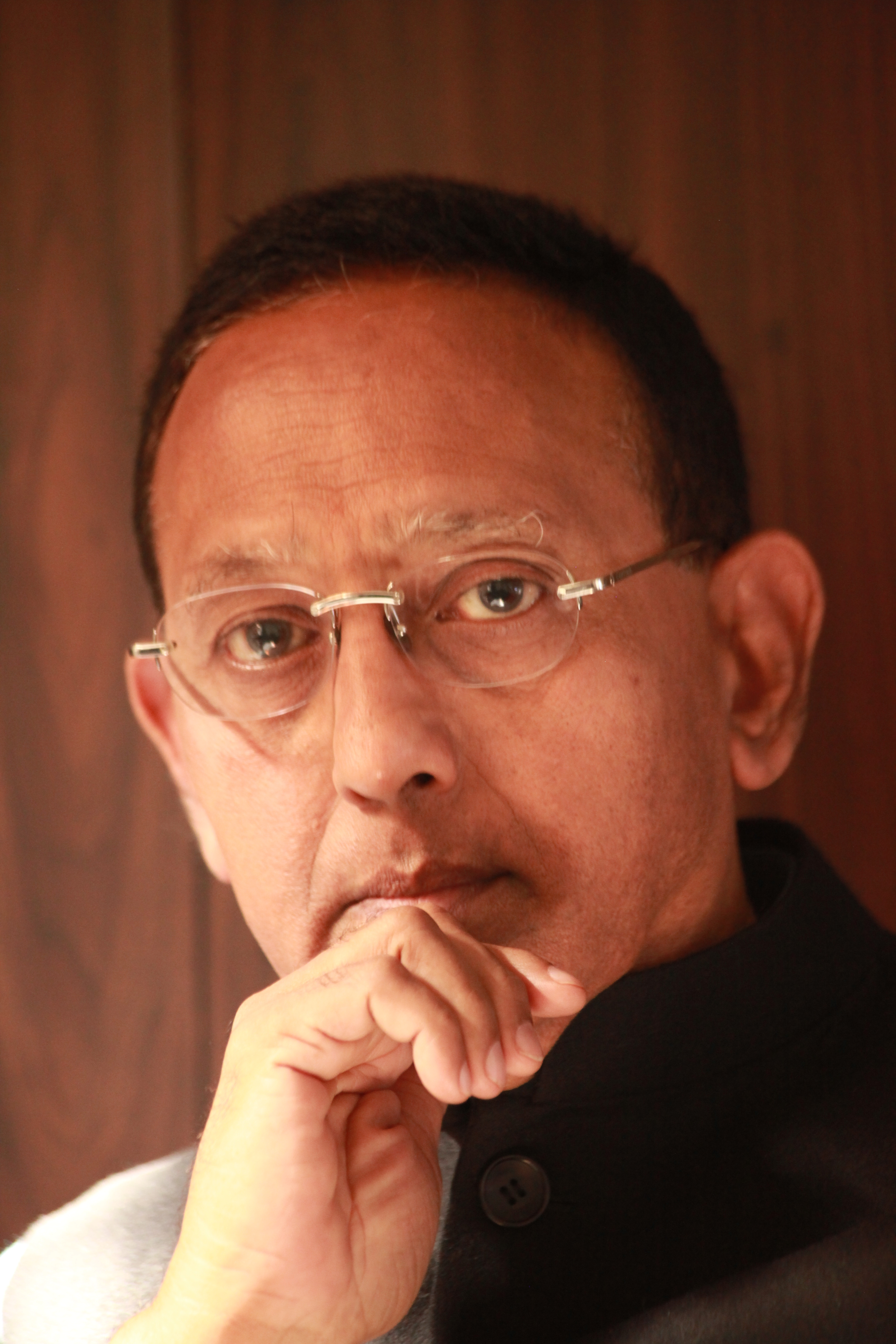
- S S Kumar
- Born: Kolkata, West Bengal
- Other names: Srinivasan Sampath Kumar

S S Kumar is an Indian businessman and the former chairman of the Council for Leather Exports.

== Early life and education ==
Sir S. S. Kumar was born in Kolkata. He studied in the National High Schools and obtained his graduation in commerce and law from Calcutta University. He also holds a diploma in Textile technology.

== Awards Received By Sir Kumar ==
The Italian Government awarded Kumar with the Knighthood of the order of the Star of Italian Solidarity in 2006.

== Books Written By Sir Kumar ==
- Silhouettes of Sundarban ISBN 81-904303-0-0
- Darjeeling Queen of the hills ISBN 81-904303-1-9
- Frozen waves Publisher Leadstart Corp. ISBN 938183623X
