= Howard B. Adelmann =

American science writer

Howard B. Adelmann (1898–1988) was an American science historian, biographer, and professor. He is best known for his 1966 biography and treatise on 17th century Italian embryologist and anatomist Marcello Malpighi. The extensive five volume, 2500 page biography, analysis, and reproductions of Malpighi's work (with interpretations from Adelmann) was entitled Marcello Malpighi and the Evolution of Embryology. The book was hailed for its unprecedented scholarship and thoroughness on the subject. Writing in the medical journal Medical History, science historian and librarian Noel Pointer called the book one of the greatest works in modern historical scholarship in the field of science and medicine. The book was a finalist for the National Book Award in the field of science in 1967.

Adelman wrote a book about Dutch anatomist Volcher Coiter in 1933 and another about anatomist and embryologist Hieronymus Fabricius in 1942. The 1942 book on Fabricius was said to be a prelude to Adelmann's magnum opus on Malpighi in 1966. The 1966 five volume set on Malpighi included an interpretation and analysis of Malpighi's study of how the chicken embryo forms into a chick in the egg, this included 11 plates from Malpighi's original work which were reproduced and colorized by Adelmann. The book also included 1200 pages discussing the embryology of specific organs (such as the heart, kidneys, and digestive tract) as well as Adelmann's interpretation of the original texts. Volume 1 of the series included a 700-page biography of Malpighi. The extensive series also included analysis and discussion of anatomists preceding Malpighi such as Aristotle, William Harvey, Pierre Gassendi, Albrecht von Haller, Arab scientists and others and how they influenced Malpighi. Reviewing the work in Medical History, Noel Pointer stated that the series was intellectually groundbreaking and robust, being able to generate new ideas and theses from one's interpretation of the work. Pointer commended Adelmann for his detailed study of Malpighi and being able to inform the reader how the scientist made his observations and came to his conclusions. He states this interpretation of his processes and thinking "will always be beyond the reach of misguided 'historians' who seek to understand and evaluate such work in the light of twentieth-century knowledge."

Reviewing the 1966 book in the journal Science, Everett Mendelsohn stated that the biography and analysis allows the reader to understand what it feels like to be a 17th-century anatomist. Mendelsohn stated that at the time, most historians "inadequately understood" Malpighi to be a performatist (one who believes organisms develop early as miniature versions of their mature form [as homunculi] and then enlarge as they develop). However, Adelmann's new scholarship on the subject advocated Malpighi's thinking as an epigeneticist; one of believes organs and organisms develop through formation of different parts and differentiation of structures over time. Mendelsohn stated that "...Adelmann has ranged far and wide in this impressive work and has provided a many-faceted analysis of the history of embryology."

For the 1966 volumes, Adelmann was honored by the University of Bologna (where Malpighi studied and taught) in 1972, and in 1966 he was honored by the government of Italy by being awarded the Star of Italian Solidarity.

Adelmann taught embryology at Cornell University starting in 1919 while he was still an undergraduate at the university. He then earned a master's degree and PhD from the university in 1922 and 1924, respectively. He was chairman of zoology at Cornell from 1944 to 1959.

Adelmann died in 1988 at his home in Ithaca, New York. He was married to Dorothy Schullian Adelmann.
