= Zaida Muxí =

Argentine architect and city planner (born 1964)

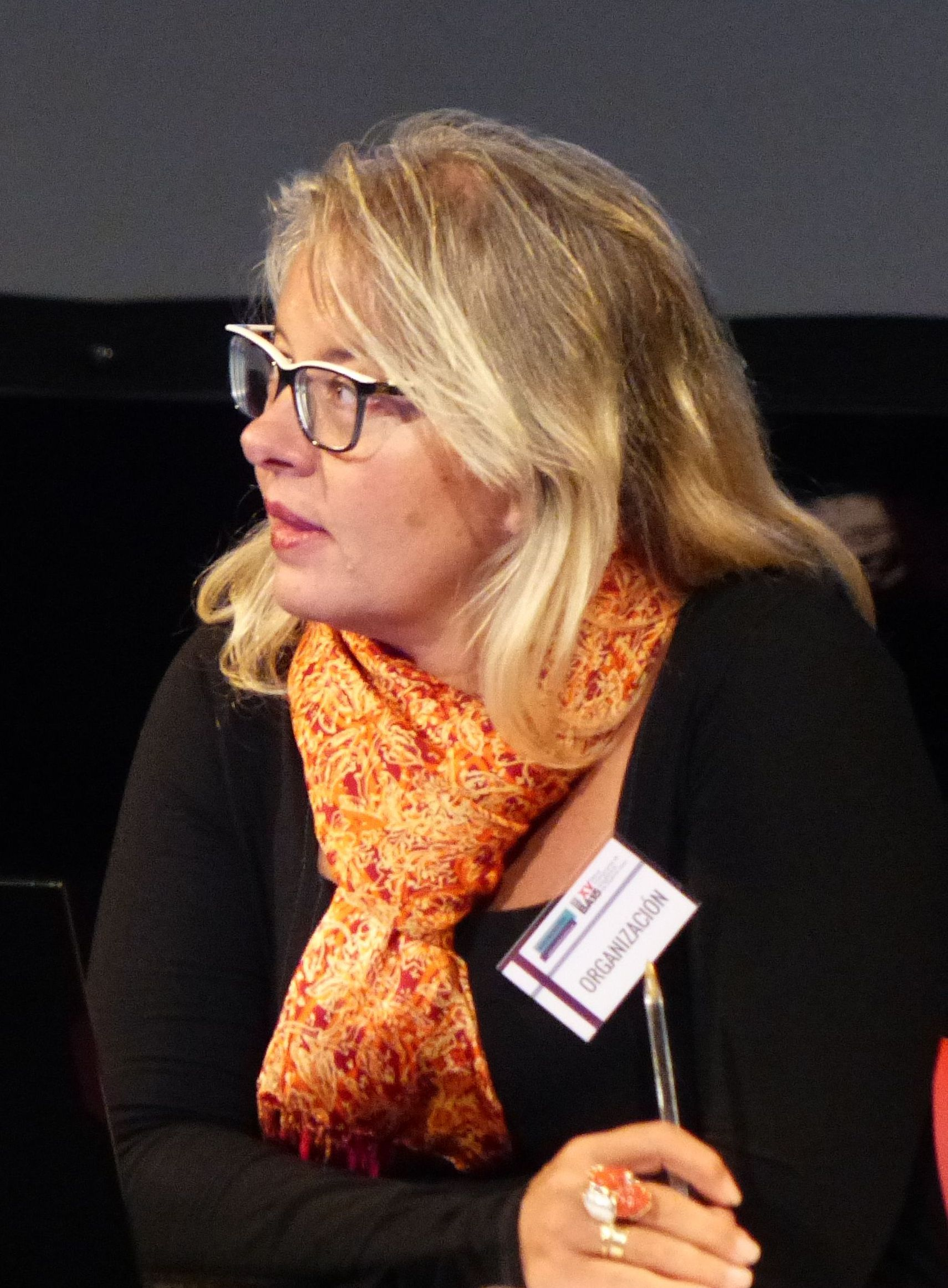
- Born: 1964 (age 61–62); Buenos Aires, Argentina
- Education: University of Buenos Aires
- Occupation: Architect
- Practice: Polytechnic University of Catalonia

Zaida Muxí Martínez (born 1964 in Buenos Aires) is an Argentine architect and city planner who graduated in the Faculty of Architecture, Design and Urbanism at the University of Buenos Aires,

Muxí earned her doctorate from the Upper Technical School of Architecture of Seville and later served as professor in the Upper Technical School of Architecture of Barcelona.

She is co-director, with Josep Maria Montaner, of the Máster Laboratory of the House of the 21st century of the Polytechnic University of Catalonia. Muxí collaborates in the supplement Cultura/s of the journal La Vanguardia Her body of work is characterized by her experience of space and gender. Muxí occupied the penultimate place in the list of Ricard Gomà Carmona (ICV) of the candidature in Barcelona for the municipal Elections of Spain of 2011.

== Publications ==
From 2009 she directed visions, the magazine of the Upper Technical School of Architecture of Barcelona.

- Borja, Jordi; Muxí, Zaida (2003). El espacio público: ciudad y ciudadanía. Electa. ISBN 978-84-8156-343-6.
- López, Guillermo; Muxí, Zaida; Puigjaner, Anna (2004). Elemental: reflexiones en torno a la vivienda mínima. ETSAB. ISBN 978-84-608-0140-5.
- Montaner, Josep Maria; Muxí, Zaida; Falagán, David H. (2011). Herramientas para habitar el presente: la vivienda del siglo XXI. Actar. ISBN 978-84-614-7504-9.
- Muxí, Zaida (2004). La arquitectura de la ciudad global. Gustavo Gili. ISBN 978-84-252-1560-5.
- Muxí, Zaida (2007). Sota les llambordes, la platja = bajo los adoquines, la playa. EUMO. ISBN 9788497662284.
