= Lawrence Lotito =

American business owner, meteorologist, and USAF major

Lawrence Edward Lotito OSSI
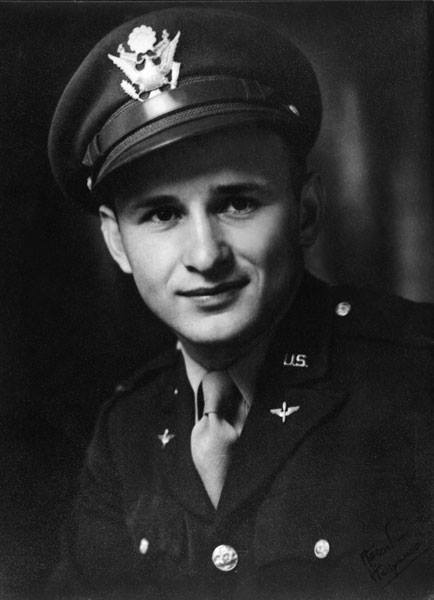
- Major Lawrence Edward Lotito
- Born: May 10, 1921; Arvada, Colorado, U.S.
- Died: December 18, 2004 (aged 83); Wheat Ridge, Colorado, U.S.
- Occupations: Business owner, meteorologist
- Spouse: Patricia Marie Walsh (Married 1945)
- Children: 6

Major Cav. Lawrence Edward Lotito OMRI, OSSI (May 10, 1921 – December 18, 2004) was an American business owner, meteorologist, and major in the United States Air Force.

== Early life and education ==
Lotito grew up on a thirty-acre farm in Arvada, Colorado alongside his three siblings. He was born to first-generation Italian immigrant parents Rocco and Concetta Lotito. After graduating from Arvada High School in 1939, he earned a Bachelor of Science degree in Chemistry, Mathematics, and Physics from the University of Colorado. Lotito then went on to earn a meteorology degree from University of California, Los Angeles.

== Military career ==
During his military career, Lotito served six years of active duty in both World War II and the Korean War. In 1943 he was retained at UCLA as a metrology instructor. In this role, he trained meteorology cadets, many of whom became the specialized weather reconnaissance officers for strategic Pacific missions. In 1944, Lotito held a high-ranking position at Wendover Air Field in Utah, which served as the primary training and assembly site for the 509th Composite Group. In 1945, Lotito was sent to Florida for a series of top secret war cabinet meetings with other senior ranking U.S. Military officials, to simulate the tropical and trans-Pacific flight conditions for the 509th. It was during these sessions that Allied Forces utilized long-range climatological modeling to plan the exact weather coordination and "clear sky" windows for the dropping of the atomic bomb (Little Boy) on Hiroshima. For his services, Lotito was offered a promotion of colonel on the condition that he be stationed in Japan for the next two years. He declined the promotion as he was not allowed to bring his newly wedded wife, Patricia Walsh. Lotito retired as a major in the United States Air Force in 1981.

== Later life ==
=== TWA ===
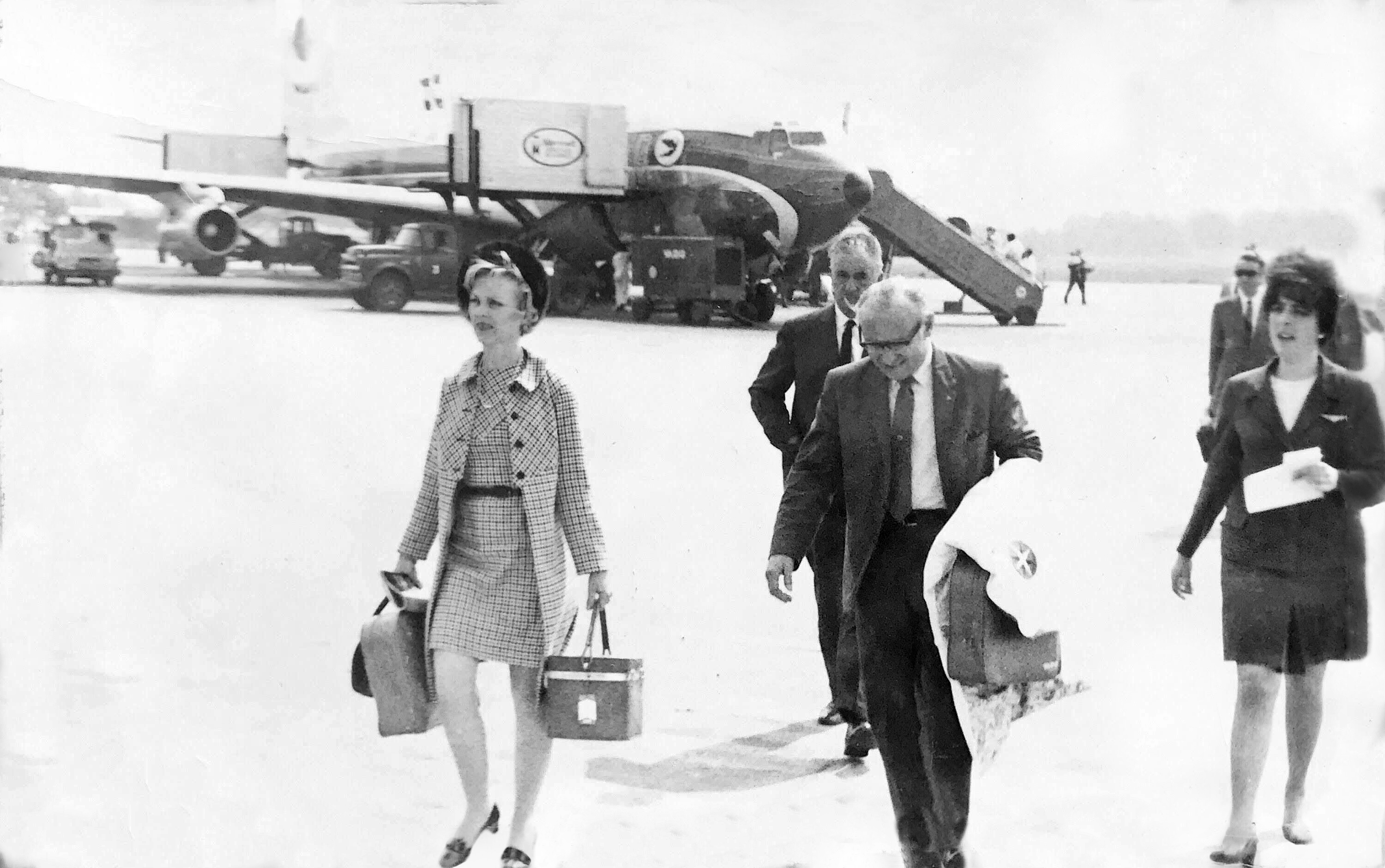
TWA's & Heathrow's AOC Chairman Larry Lotito arriving at Heathrow

Lotito joined Trans World Airlines (TWA) in 1946 as a meteorologist. In 1947, Lotito and his wife were relocated to Shannon, Ireland after being requested by the Irish Government. Due to his familiarity with the North Atlantic weather, Lotito was reassigned as Squadron Consultant to the Hemispheric Weather Center in Ruislip, England. In 1953 Lotito returned to TWA as station and district transport manager in both Rome as well as London. It was here that he was decorated by the Italian Government with a knighthood for his work with the Italian Meteorological Service. In 1968, Lotito was named Chairman of Heathrow Airport Operators' Committee (AOC). At that time, the London group, with 61 member airlines, was the largest and oldest AOC in the world.

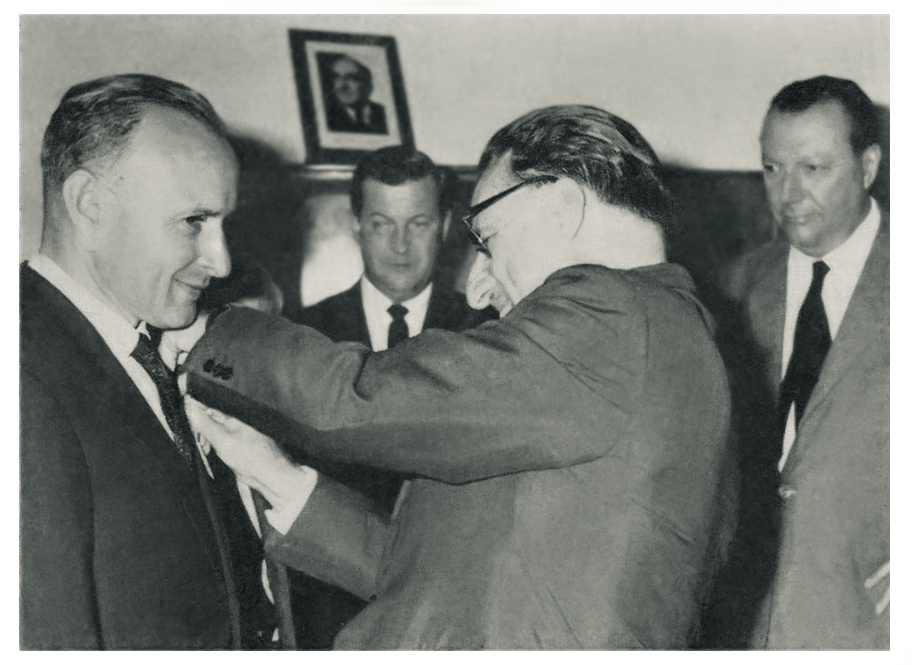
Lawrence Lotito receiving a knighthood from Italian president Giovanni Leone

=== Marriott and Air Cuisine ===
Lotito left TWA in 1972 to join the Marriott Corporation as Vice President and Director of Operations in Europe, Africa, and the Middle East. In 1974 Lotito went on to leave Marriott to join International Catering Consultants. It was there that he founded Air Cuisine, an airline catering service which developed kitchens in the UK as well as the Middle East.

Lotito sold Air Cuisine in 1986. Lotito then returned to Arvada, Colorado to live out his retirement. Major Cav. Lawrence Edward Lotito OSSI died on December 18, 2004. He is buried at the Arvada Cemetery in Arvada, Colorado.

== Honors ==
Knight of the Order of the Star of Italian Solidarity (Cavaliere dell'Ordine della Stella della solidarietà italiana) (May 25, 1963)
