= Universidad de Mendoza =

Private university in Argentina

University of Mendoza
- Type: Private university
- Established: 1960
- Dean: Salvador B. Navarría PhD
- Location: Mendoza, Argentina, Mendoza Province, Argentina; 32.891711°S 68.861129°W
- Website: www.um.edu.ar

The University of Mendoza (Spanish: Universidad de Mendoza, UM) is an Argentine non-profit private university in the city of Mendoza with a branch in the city of San Rafael.

== History ==
The University of Mendoza was established on December 22, 1959. The university is the oldest and biggest private non-profit institution in the region of Cuyo.

== Schools ==
=== School of Design, Architecture and Urban Design ===
- Architecture and Urban Design (R.I.B.A. Accredited Program)
- Interior Architecture
- Graphic Design
- Fashion Design

The Department of Architecture has a RIBA/CONEAU-accredited five-year, full-time course of studies in architecture leading to the UM Intermediate Examination (RIBA Part 1) and UM Final Examination (RIBA Part 2).

The Faculty of Architecture building, designed by Enrico Tedeschi and constructed between 1962 and 1964, was selected in 2015 for the exhibition "Latin America in Construction: Architecture 1955-1980" at the Museum of Modern Art (MoMA) in New York City.

=== School of Engineering ===
- Computer Hardware Engineering
- Computer Software Engineering
- Industrial Engineering
- Informatics Engineering
- Electronics Engineering
- Bioengineering

=== School of Law ===
- Law
- Notary

=== School of Medicine ===
- Medicine
- Nursing
- Anesthesiology
- Clinical Pathology
- Surgery
- Haematology
- Radiology

=== School of Dentistry ===
- Dentistry

=== School of Psychology ===
- Psychology

=== School of Economic Sciences ===
- Accountancy
- Business Administration

== Notable people ==
- Noemí Goytia (born 1936), architect, professor
- Alejandro C. Frery (born 160), statistician, remote sensing expert, professor
