= Marina Waisman =

Argentine architect, critic, and writer (1920-1997)

- Born: Marina Kitroser; 26 November 1920; Buenos Aires, Argentina
- Died: 1997 (aged 76–77); Río Cuarto, Córdoba, Argentina
- Occupation: Architect

Marina Kitroser de Waisman (26 November 1920 – 1997) was an Argentine architect, critic, and writer. She was awarded the Premio América in 1987.

== Biography ==
Waisman was born in Buenos Aires. She graduated as an architect from the National University of Córdoba in 1944. She was a professor at the same university from 1948, when the first Chair of Contemporary Architecture was created, until 1971. Between 1956 and 1959, she taught at National University of Tucumán with Enrico Tedeschi and Francisco Bullrich, creating Instituto Interuniversitario de Historia de Arquitectura (IIDEHA; Interuniversity Institute of History of Architecture).

In 1974, she joined the Faculty of Architecture of the Catholic University of Cordoba where she formed the Instituto de Historia y Preservación del Patrimonio (Institute of History and Heritage Preservation; now called the Marina Waisman Institute). She founded and developed Seminarios de Arquitectura Latinoamericana (SAL; Latin American Architecture Seminar) in 1985 in Buenos Aires. In 1987, she was awarded the America Prize for her work and critical contributions to Latin American architecture. In 1980, in collaboration with Freddy Guidi and Teresa Sassi, she worked on the recovery and restoration of the Municipal Museum José Malanca (today Centro Cultural España Córdoba). In 1991, she was appointed professor emeritus of the National University of Córdoba. The following year, she returned to the National University of Córdoba, creating there the Center for Research Training in History, Theory and Criticism of Architecture, now called the Marina Waisman Center.

She was a member of the Academia Nacional de Bellas Artes de Argentina. Waisman died in 1997 in Río Cuarto, Córdoba.

== Selected works ==
- 1964, 10 recorridos por Córdoba a traves de su arquitectura (with Juan Carlos Montenegro; Rodolfo Imas)
- 1967, Iideha : publicación semestral de crítica y bibliografia de historia de la arquitectura : Instituto Interuniversitario de Historia de la Arquitectura, Córdoba, Argentina, diciembre, 1957
- 1974, Algunos conceptos críticos para el estudio de la arquitectura latinoamericana
- 1976, Canadá : arquitectura educacional y hospitalaria
- 1977, La estructura histórica del entorno
- 1978, Documentos para una historia de la arquitectura argentina (Ramón Gutiérrez)
- 1980, Baudizzione, Erbin, Lestard, Varas
- 1986, La parábola de la modernidad : arquitectura joven en Alemania
- 1987, Arquitectura colonial argentina (with Ricardo Jesse Alexander)
- 1989, 10 arquitectos latinoamericanos (with César Naselli)
- 1990, El interior de la historia : historiografía arquitectónica para uso de Latinoamericanos
- 1991, Arquitectura en la era Posmoderna
- 1995, La arquitectura descentrada
- 1996, Córdoba Argentina, guía de arquitectura : 15 (with Juana Bustamante; Gustavo Ceballos)

== Bibliography ==
- Carranza, Luis E.; Lara, Fernando Luiz (5 January 2015). Modern Architecture in Latin America: Art, Technology, and Utopia. University of Texas Press. ISBN 978-0-292-76818-5.
- Dieste, Eladio; Gutiérrez, Ramón (1 January 1996). Architettura e società: l'America Latina nel XX secolo. Editoriale Jaca Book. ISBN 978-88-16-43918-4.
