= Project Runway season 13 =

Project Runway
- Season 13
- No. of tasks: 14
- No. of contestants: 19
- Winner: Sean Kelly
- No. of episodes: 15

Release
- Original network: Lifetime
- Original release: July 24 – October 23, 2014

Season chronology
- ← Previous; Season 12 Next → Season 14

Project Runway Season 13 is the thirteenth season of the television show Project Runway, appearing on Lifetime. The season began airing on July 24, 2014, with 19 designers competing to become "the next great American designer." In addition, Amanda Valentine, a designer from Season 11, returned to compete once again for the grand prize. Valentine was voted back by fans in an online poll, winning against Alexander Pope and Ken Laurence, both of Season 12.

Supermodel Heidi Klum, Marie Claire creative director Nina Garcia, and fashion designer Zac Posen all returned as judges this season. Tim Gunn maintained his role as the workroom mentor.

Aldo was the exclusive retail sponsor for Project Runway's 13th season and has merchandised the accessory wall with an assortment of products.

This season’s winner’s prize package was valued at over $300,000 (US 2014), and included: $100,00 from Red Robin to launch their business (and the opportunity to design a fashion accessory for all Red Robin servers), a shoe and accessory collection from Aldo (to help enhance their upcoming runway shows), a premier home entertainment system courtesy of Samsung, from Mary Kay an entire years worth of beauty products for their fashion shows and professional markup artist services for their debut show, a complete sewing and crafting studio from Brother Industries sewing and embroidery, travel and hotel accommodations to fashion capitals and inspiring locations around the world from Best Western International, a 2015 Lexus NX F Sport and a fashion spread in Marie Claire magazine featuring the winning model.

In 2016, Fäde zu Grau, Mitchell Perry, Emily Payne and Kini Zamora competed on Project Runway All Stars (season 5), with Fäde placing 13th, Mitchell placing 10th, Emily placing 5th, and Kini being the runner-up.

In 2018, Amanda Valentine and Char Glover competed on Project Runway All Stars (season 6), with Amanda placing 11th and Char placing 10th of 16.

In 2019, Sean Kelly competed on Project Runway All Stars (season 7) against worldwide Project Runway winners where he placed 7th.

== Contestants ==
| Contestant | Age | Hometown | Finish | Outcome |
|---|---|---|---|---|
| Tim Navarro | 32 | Rochester, MN | Episode 2 | 17th place |
| Nzinga Knight | 33 | Brooklyn, NY | Episode 2 | 17th place |
| Emmanuel Tobias | 29 | Dallas, TX | Episode 2 | 17th place |
| Jefferson Musanda | 25 | Lynn, MA | Episode 2 | 16th place |
| Carrie Sleutskaya | 24 | Moscow, Russia | Episode 3 | 15th place |
| Angela Sum | 32 | Toronto, Canada | Episode 4 | 14th place |
| Hannah Lander (Note: Lander participated in this season as Hernan Lander, pre-transition.) | 33 | New York, NY | Episode 5 | 13th place |
| Mitchell Perry | 25 | Jacksonville, FL | Episode 6 | 11th place |
| Kristine Guico | 26 | Naperville, IL | Episode 6 | 11th place |
| Samantha Plasencia | 27 | San Antonio, TX | Episode 8 | 10th place |
| Fäde zu Grau | 45 | Altdöbern, East Germany | Episode 9 | 9th place |
| Sandhya Garg | 28 | Delhi, India | Episode 10 | 8th place |
| Alexander Knox | 22 | Kankakee, IL | Episode 11 | 7th place |
| Korina Emmerich | 28 | Eugene, OR | Episode 12 | 6th place |
| Emily Payne | 41 | Temple, TX | Episode 13 | 5th place |
| Charketa "Char" Glover | 37 | Detroit, MI | Episode 15 | 4th place |
| Kiniokahokula "Kini" Zamora | 30 | Kapolei, HI | Episode 15 | 3rd place |
| Amanda Valentine^{(Note: Valentine was chosen by audience poll to join the season, having previously participated in Season 11.)} | 32 | Lincoln, NE | Episode 15 | Runner-up |
| Sean Kelly | 25 | Wellington, New Zealand | Episode 15 | Winner |

== Designer progress ==
Designer Elimination Table
| Designers | 2^{1} | 3^{2} | 4^{3} | 5 | 6 | 7^{4} | 8 | 9 | 10 | 11 | 12 | 13^{5} | 14 | 15 | Eliminated Episode |
|---|---|---|---|---|---|---|---|---|---|---|---|---|---|---|---|
| Sean | IN | IN | LOW | LOW | WIN | WIN | HIGH | WIN | LOW | IN | HIGH | HIGH | ADV | WINNER | 15 - Finale, Part 2 |
| Amanda | HIGH | WIN | IN | WIN | HIGH | IN | HIGH | IN | IN | LOW | HIGH | HIGH | ADV | RUNNER-UP | 15 - Finale, Part 2 |
| Kini | IN | IN | IN | HIGH | HIGH | HIGH | LOW | WIN | WIN | HIGH | WIN | HIGH | ADV | 3RD PLACE | 15 - Finale, Part 2 |
| Char | HIGH | IN | IN | IN | IN | SAFE | IN | IN | HIGH | LOW | LOW | LOW | ADV | 4TH PLACE | 15 - Finale, Part 2 |
| Emily | IN | IN | HIGH | IN | IN | HIGH | IN | LOW | LOW | HIGH | HIGH | OUT | | | 13 - Fashion Week |
| Korina | IN | HIGH | IN | IN | LOW | IN | WIN | LOW | HIGH | WIN | OUT | | | | 12 - The Highest Bidder |
| Alexander | IN | IN | LOW | HIGH | IN | LOW | LOW | IN | IN | OUT | | | | | 11 - Muse on the Street |
| Sandhya | WIN | LOW | WIN | IN | IN | LOW | IN | HIGH | OUT | | | | | | 10 - American Girl Doll |
| Fäde | IN | IN | IN | IN | IN | HIGH | IN | OUT | | | | | | | 9 - The Rainway |
| Samantha | IN | IN | IN | IN | IN | LOW | OUT | | | | | | | | 8 - Priceless Runway |
| Kristine | IN | HIGH | HIGH | LOW | OUT | | | | | | | | | | 6 - The Klum of Doom |
| Mitchell | LOW | IN | IN | IN | OUT | | | | | | | | | | 6 - The Klum of Doom |
| Hannah | IN | LOW | IN | OUT | | | | | | | | | | | 5 - A Suitable Twist |
| Angela | LOW | IN | OUT | | | | | | | | | | | | 4 - Welcome to the Future |
| Carrie | IN | OUT | | | | | | | | | | | | | 3 - Unconventional Movie Nite |
| Jefferson | OUT | | | | | | | | | | | | | | 2 - The Judges Decide |
| Emmanuel | OUT | | | | | | | | | | | | | | 2 - The Judges Decide |
| Nzinga | OUT | | | | | | | | | | | | | | 2 - The Judges Decide |
| Tim | OUT | | | | | | | | | | | | | | 2 - The Judges Decide |

^1: In episode 2, Tim Navarro, Nzinga Knight, and Emmanuel Tobias were the 3 designers who were eliminated before the final 16 were officially participants of the show.
^2: In episode 3, the judges thought Sandhya had the weakest look on her team, which had the lowest score. She could have gone home if she didn't have immunity. They also told Angela that her team could have won if her look had not pulled down their score.
^3: In episode 4, Heidi stated that Amanda was lucky to have immunity because none of the judges liked her look.
^4: In episode 8, Tim Gunn decided to retroactively use his "Tim Gunn Save" on Char, canceling out her elimination in challenge 6 (episode 7).
^5: In episode 13, there was no winner announced in the challenge. Heidi only announced that Kini, Sean, Amanda and Char will go to fashion week. But the critique shows the judges like the work by Kini, Sean and Amanda.

The designer won Project Runway Season 13.
The designer advanced to Fashion Week.
The designer won the challenge.
The designer came in second but did not win the challenge.
The designer had one of the highest scores for that challenge, but did not win.
The designer had one of the lowest scores for that challenge, but was not eliminated.
The designer was in the bottom two, but was not eliminated.
The designer lost and was eliminated from the competition.
The designer lost, but was brought back to the competition by Tim Gunn.
The designer failed in the final auditions.

Model Elimination Table
| Model | 2 | 3 | 4 | 5 | 6 | 7 | 8^{1} | 9 | 10 | 11 | 12 | 13 | 14 | 15 |
|---|---|---|---|---|---|---|---|---|---|---|---|---|---|---|
| Alisar | SG | SG | SG | SG | SG | SG | SG | SG | - | - | SK | SK | SK | WINNER |
| Nikola | JM | AV | AV | AV | AV | AV | AV | AV | - | - | AV | AV | AV | 2ND PLACE |
| Lea | SK | SK | SK | SK | KZ | KZ | KZ | KZ | - | - | KZ, AV | KZ | KZ | 3RD PLACE |
| Bella | MP | MP | MP | MP | MP | OUT | CG | CG | - | - | CG | CG | CG | 4TH PLACE |
| Angelica | CG | CG | CG | CG | SK | SK | SK | SK | - | - | - | SK | OUT | |
| Jasmine R. | EP | EP | EP | EP | EP | EP | EP | EP | - | - | EP | EP | OUT | |
| Alexandria | KE | KE | KE | KE | KE | KE | KE | KE | - | - | KE | OUT | | |
| Nea | AK | AK | AK | AK | AK | AK | AK | AK | - | - | KE | OUT | | |
| Jasmine A. | FG | FG | FG | FG | FG | FG | FG | FG | - | - | CG | OUT | | |
| Brianna | HL | HL | HL | HL | SP | SP | SP | OUT | | | KZ | OUT | | |
| Christabel | KZ | KZ | KZ | KZ | CG | CG | OUT | | | | | | | |
| DJ | KG | KG | KG | KG | KG | OUT | | | | | | | | |
| Ashley | SP | SP | SP | SP | OUT | | | | | | | | | |
| Rachel | AS | AS | AS | OUT | | | | | | | | | | |
| Ploy | CS | CS | OUT | | | | | | | | | | | |
| Camille | AV | OUT | | | | | | | | | | | | |

^1: In episode 8, Bella replaces Christabel. Previews show Bella continuing.

- In episodes 10 & 11, the models were not needed in the challenge.

The model won Project Runway Season 13.
The model wore the winning design that challenge.
The model wore the design that came in second.
The model wore the design with one of the highest scores.
The model wore the design that had one of the lowest scores.
The model wore the design that landed in the bottom two.
The model wore the losing design that challenge.
The model was eliminated.
The model was out, but was brought back.

Models

- Alexandria Serafini
- Alisar Ailabouni
- Angelica Guillen-Jimenez
- Brianna Mellon
- Christabel Campbell
- Jasmine Rivers
- Jasmine Agnew
- Lea Mihevc
- Nea McLin
- Nikola Anderson
- Bella Davis
- DJ Smith
- Ashley Rossi
- Rachel McCray
- Ploy Supawetvehon
- Camille Annise-Lewis

Designer Legend

- Alexander Knox: AK
- Amanda Valentine: AV
- Angela Sum: AS
- Carrie Sleutskaya: CS
- Char Glover: CG
- Emily Payne: EP
- Fäde Zu Grau: FG
- Hannah Lander: HL
- Jefferson Musanda: JM
- Kini Zamora: KZ
- Korina Emmerich: KE
- Kristine Guico: KG
- Mitchell Perry: MP
- Samantha Plasencia: SP
- Sandhya Garg: SG
- Sean Kelly: SK

== Episodes ==
=== Episode 1: Road to the Runway ===
Original airdate: July 24, 2014

- This was a special episode during which Tim Gunn shared how the Season 13 designers were chosen. First there was a nationwide casting call where hundreds of aspiring ones submitted their portfolios and home videos. From there the most promising designers were invited to audition before a panel of judges which included Gunn and Project Runway alums Mondo Guerra (Season 8 runner-up and winner of the first PR: All Stars), Laura Kathleen Planck (Season 9), Anthony Ryan Auld (Season 9 and winner of the second PR: All Stars), Nick Verreos (Season 2 and winning mentor on Under the Gunn) and Dmitry Sholokhov (Season 10 winner). Eighteen designers were selected for the final audition on Episode 2. Of note is that Emily, Kini, Korina and Tim had unsuccessfully tried out for past seasons of PR.

=== Episode 2: The Judges Decide ===
Original airdate: July 24, 2014

- On the Season 13 opener the 18 designers selected pre-season must face one final audition before landing one of 15 coveted spots on the series. We then learn that Amanda Valentine from Season 11 is the #RunwayRedemption winner having received more fan votes than both Ken Lawrence and Alexander Pope from Season 12.
- For the Episode 2 challenge, the 16 designers were given a trunk of six random fabrics and tasked with creating a look that would represent their spring collection if they made it to New York Fashion Week. Each designer was allowed to barter and exchange fabric with the other designers. The winner received immunity.
- Judges: Heidi Klum, Nina Garcia, Zac Posen
- Guest Judge: Julie Bowen
- WINNER: Sandhya
- ELIMINATED: Tim, Nzinga and Emmanuel after the final audition -and- Jefferson for the Episode 2 challenge

=== Episode 3: Unconventional Movie Nite ===
Original airdate: July 31, 2014

- The designers visit a local movie theater, then must produce a look from unconventional materials found in the theater and on a movie set. The designers worked in teams of 3 to create a cohesive mini-collection.

| Team Name | Team Members |
|---|---|
| Silver | Kristine, Korina, Amanda |
| Blue | Angela, Fade, Sean |
| Purple | Mitchell, Char, Kini |
| Green | Samantha, Emily, Alexander |
| Red | Sandhya, Carrie, Hannah |

- Judges: Heidi Klum, Nina Garcia, Zac Posen
- Guest Judge: Garance Doré
- WINNER: Amanda
- ELIMINATED: Carrie

=== Episode 4: Welcome to the Future ===
Original airdate: August 7, 2014

- The designers use their past memories to create a look for the future and can be photographed in Marie Claire Magazine in the next 20 years.
- Judges: Heidi Klum, Nina Garcia, Zac Posen
- Guest Judge:Anne Fulenwider & Amanda de Cadenet
- WINNER: Sandhya
- ELIMINATED: Angela

=== Episode 5: A Suitable Twist ===
Original airdate: August 14, 2014

- This was the Red Robin Challenge. The designers must revamp men's vintage suits to create looks for the modern woman. Since Sandhya won the last challenge, she got to choose her suit first. Then she got to choose every suit for every person. Many were happy and some were upset, especially Hernan and Mitchell.
- Judges: Heidi Klum, Nina Garcia, Zac Posen
- Guest Judge: Bethany Mota
- WINNER: Amanda
- ELIMINATED: Hannah

=== Episode 6: The Klum of Doom ===
Original airdate: August 21, 2014

- The designers fashion a look for host Heidi Klum to wear to the Emmys. When Heidi and Tim made the trips around the workroom, Heidi was not satisfied. Heidi then allowed the designers to go to Mood to buy more fabric to revamp or redo their garments.
- Guest Judge: Lindsey Vonn
- WINNER: Sean
- ELIMINATED: Mitchell and Kristine

=== Episode 7: Rock the Wedding ===
Original airdate: August 28, 2014

- The designers working in pairs to create unconventional wedding dresses and reception looks.
- Judges: Heidi Klum, Nina Garcia, Zac Posen
- Guest Judge: Dita Von Teese & Chiara Ferragni
- WINNER: Sean
- ELIMINATED: Char

=== Episode 8: Priceless Runway ===
Original airdate: September 4, 2014

- Pieces of Chopard jewelry inspire looks. Also: The designers visit a museum exhibit featuring the work of designer Charles James. Tim uses his 'Tim Gunn Save' to bring back Char, after having not done so immediately following her elimination from the competition the previous week.
- Judges: Heidi Klum, Nina Garcia, Zac Posen
- Guest Judge: Caroline Scheufele
- SAVED: Char
- WINNER: Korina
- ELIMINATED: Samantha

=== Episode 9: The Rainway ===
Original airdate: September 11, 2014

- The designers create avant-garde styles that must stand up to the elements, particularly rain.
- Judges: Heidi Klum, Nina Garcia, Zac Posen
- Guest Judge: Caitlin FitzGerald
- WINNER: Sean & Kini
- ELIMINATED: Fäde

=== Episode 10: American Girl Doll ===
Original airdate: September 18, 2014

- The designers try to deliver stylish, age-appropriate looks inspired by American Girl dolls.
- Judges: Heidi Klum, Nina Garcia, Zac Posen
- Guest Judge: Elisabeth Moss & Heather Northrop
- WINNER: Kini
- ELIMINATED: Sandhya

=== Episode 11: Muse on the Street ===
Original airdate: September 25, 2014

- The clothiers seek their muse in the form of a complete stranger found on the streets of New York City. Here, they must convince the muses to undergo makeovers while creating looks for them.
- Judges: Heidi Klum, Nina Garcia, Zac Posen
- Guest Judge: Asha Leo & Michelle Monaghan
- WINNER: Korina
- ELIMINATED: Alexander

=== Episode 12: The Highest Bidder ===
Original airdate: October 2, 2014

- The designers pair up into teams of two and bid on storage containers. They must make three looks from the contents. After winner and "safes" are revealed, Bottom 2 are given one hour to create a new garment from scratch.
- Judges: Heidi Klum, Nina Garcia, Zac Posen
- Guest Judge: Christian Siriano
- WINNER: Kini
- ELIMINATED: Korina

=== Episode 13: Fashion Week: Who's In & Who's Out ===
Original airdate: October 9, 2014

- The competition heats up when a challenge determines which contestants will go to Fashion Week. Dual challenges include a street-inspired look and refashioning a losing look from previous weeks. Included: Eliminated designers return to the workroom.
- Judges: Heidi Klum, Nina Garcia, Zac Posen
- Guest Judge: Shay Mitchell
- ADVANCED TO FASHION WEEK: Kini, Sean, Amanda, Char
- ELIMINATED: Emily

=== Episode 14: Finale, Part 1 ===
Original airdate: October 16, 2014

- In Part 1 of the two-part Season 13 finale, the designers head to Rome with Tim Gunn for inspiration and to shop for fabric.
- Judges: Heidi Klum, Nina Garcia, Zac Posen
- Guest Judge: None

=== Episode 15: Finale, Part 2 ===
Original airdate: October 23, 2014

- In the conclusion of the two-part Season 13 finale, the still-standing designers present their collections at New York Fashion Week, after which the winner is named.
- Judges: Heidi Klum, Nina Garcia, Zac Posen
- Guest Judge: Emmy Rossum
- WINNER: Sean
- ELIMINATED: Amanda (2nd place), Kini (3rd place), Char (4th place)

=== Episode 16: Reunion ===
Original airdate: October 30, 2014
