= Project Runway All Stars season 7 =

Project Runway All Stars
- Season 7
- Hosted by: Alyssa Milano
- Judges: Georgina Chapman; Isaac Mizrahi
- No. of tasks: 13
- No. of contestants: 14
- Winner: Michelle Lesniak

Release
- Original network: Lifetime
- Original release: January 2 – March 27, 2019

Season chronology
- ← Previous; Season 6

The seventh season of Project Runway All Stars premiered on January 2, 2019, and concluded on March 27. Featuring past winners of both Project Runway and Project Runway All-Stars as contestants, previous winners from international Project Runway franchises also competed in the season.

This was the last season of Project Runway to air on Lifetime, and its broadcast was delayed due to the allegations against Harvey Weinstein and subsequent bankruptcy of The Weinstein Company. Alyssa Milano returned as host and both Georgina Chapman and Isaac Mizrahi likewise returned as judges.

== Judges ==
In addition to Alyssa Milano both Georgina Chapman and Isaac Mizrahi returned as judges for this season. The mentor for this season was Anne Fulenwider. Some of the celebrity guest judges for season 7 were Debra Messing, Vanessa Williams, Anna Camp, Andrew Rannells, Andrea Riseborough, Cynthia Erivo, Asia Kate Dillon, Wendy Williams, Tamron Hall, Danica Patrick, Disney stars Sofia Carson and Peyton List, designers Reem Acra and Rebecca Minkoff, fashion icon Iris Apfel, models Lily Aldridge, Olivia Culpo, Joan Smalls, Martha Hunt, Jasmine Tookes, Kiera Chaplin and Project Runway judge Nina Garcia.

== Contestants ==
Contestant	Hometown	Winning season(s)	Outcome	Finish
Sunny Fong	Toronto, Canada	Canada Season 2	Episode 2	14th place
Seth Aaron Henderson	Vancouver, United States	US Season 7	Episode 3	13th place
Seth Aaron Henderson	Vancouver, United States	All Stars 3	Episode 3	13th place
Jasper Garvida	London, United Kingdom	UK Series 3	Episode 4	12th place
Juli Grbac	Brisbane, Australia	Australia Season 1	Episode 5	11th place
Anya Ayoung-Chee	Port of Spain, Trinidad and Tobago	US Season 9	Episode 6	10th place
Django Steenbakker	Amsterdam‚ Netherlands	Holland Season 1	Episode 7	9th place
Cynthia Hayashi	Guarulhos, Brazil	Brazil Season 1	Episode 8	8th place
Sean Kelly	Brooklyn, United States	US Season 13	Episode 9	7th place
Christina Exie	Melbourne, Australia	Australia Season 4	Episode 10	6th place
Anthony Ryan Auld	San Antonio, United States	All Stars 2	Episode 11	5th place
Evan Biddell	Saskatoon, Canada	Canada Season 1	Episode 13	4th place
Irina Shabayeva	Brooklyn, United States	US Season 6	Episode 13	3rd place
Dmitry Sholokhov	New York, United States	US Season 10	Episode 13	Runner-up
Dmitry Sholokhov	New York, United States	All Stars 4	Episode 13	Runner-up
Michelle Lesniak	Portland, United States	US Season 11	Episode 13	Winner

== Designer Progress ==
Designer	Episode													Eliminated episode
Designer	1	2	3	4	5	6	7	8	9	10	11	12	13	Eliminated episode
Michelle	IN	IN	HIGH	IN	WIN	LOW	HIGH	HIGH	HIGH	WIN	LOW	LOW	WINNER	13 – All the World's a Runway
Dmitry	WIN	IN	IN	HIGH	HIGH	IN	IN	IN	LOW	LOW	HIGH	LOW	RUNNER-UP	13 – All the World's a Runway
Irina	HIGH	LOW	WIN	HIGH	IN	HIGH	LOW	HIGH	LOW	HIGH	WIN	HIGH	3RD PLACE	13 – All the World's a Runway
Biddell	HIGH	IN	IN	IN	IN	HIGH	IN	WIN	IN	LOW	HIGH	WIN	4TH PLACE	13 – All the World's a Runway
Anthony Ryan	LOW	WIN	IN	IN	HIGH	IN	WIN	IN	HIGH	LOW	OUT			11 – Nina Says Don’t Cry Over Spilt Silk
Christina	IN	LOW	IN	WIN	IN	IN	HIGH	LOW	WIN	OUT				10 – Climate Quick Change
Sean		HIGH	LOW	IN	LOW	WIN	LOW	LOW	OUT					9 – All-Inclusive
Cynthia	LOW	IN	IN	LOW	IN	IN	IN	OUT						8 – Penneys from Heaven
Django	IN	IN	IN	LOW	LOW	LOW	OUT							7 – Pure Imagination
Anya	LOW	IN	IN	IN	IN	OUT								6 – Pedal to the Metal
Juli		IN	LOW	IN	OUT									5 – On the Prowl
Jasper	IN	IN	HIGH	OUT										4 – Of Corsets Fashion
Seth Aaron	IN	HIGH	OUT											3 – Buckle Up!
Sunny	IN	OUT												2 – Top of the Class

The designer won Project Runway All Stars: Season 7.
The designer won the challenge.
The designer came in second but did not win the challenge.
The designer had one of the highest scores for that challenge, but did not win.
The designer had one of the lowest scores for that challenge, but was not eliminated.
The designer was in the bottom two, but was not eliminated.
The designer lost and was eliminated from the competition.

== Rate the Runway Results ==
Designer	Episode													Eliminated episode
Designer	1	2	3	4	5	6	7	8	9	10	11	12	13	Eliminated episode
Michelle	IN	IN	IN	IN	WIN	LOW	HIGH	HIGH	HIGH	HIGH	LOW	HIGH	WINNER	13 – All the World's a Runway
Dmitry	WIN	IN	IN	LOW	LOW	IN	IN	IN	OUT	OUT	IN	LOW	3RD PLACE	13 – All the World's a Runway
Irina	IN	IN	HIGH	WIN	IN	HIGH	LOW	HIGH	LOW	LOW	WIN	LOW	4TH PLACE	13 – All the World's a Runway
Evan Biddell	HIGH	IN	IN	IN	IN	HIGH	IN	HIGH	IN	HIGH	IN	WIN	Runner up	13 – All the World's a Runway
Anthony Ryan	LOW	WIN	IN	IN	HIGH	IN	WIN	IN	LOW	LOW	OUT			11 – Nina Says Don’t Cry Over Spilt Silk
Christina	IN	IN	WIN	HIGH	HIGH	IN	HIGH	LOW	WIN	WIN				10 – Climate Quick Change
Sean		HIGH	LOW	HIGH	IN	WIN	LOW	LOW	HIGH					9 – All-Inclusive
Cynthia	IN	IN	HIGH	IN	IN	IN	IN	OUT						8 – Penneys from Heaven
Django	IN	LOW	IN	IN	IN	LOW	OUT							7 – Pure Imagination
Anya	LOW	IN	IN	LOW	IN	OUT								6 – Pedal to the Metal
Juli		IN	LOW	IN	OUT									5 – On the Prowl
Jasper	LOW	IN	IN	OUT										4 – Of Corsets Fashion
Seth Aaron	HIGH	HIGH	OUT											3 – Buckle Up!
Sunny	IN	OUT												2 – Top of the Class

The designer won Project Runway All Stars: Season 7.
The designer won the challenge.
The designer came in second but did not win the challenge.
The designer had one of the highest scores for that challenge, but did not win.
The designer had one of the lowest scores for that challenge, but was not eliminated.
The designer was in the bottom two, but was not eliminated.
The designer lost and was eliminated from the competition.

== Episodes ==
=== Episode 1: All Stars Goes Global ===
Original airdate: January 2, 2019

"Project Runway winners from the U.S. and around the world compete in the first-ever fashion world championship", and were challenged to create an original design to showcase the region they are from.

- Guest Judge: Debra Messing
- WINNER: Dmitry Sholokhov
- ELIMINATED: None

At the end of the episode, rather than an elimination, two more all-star designers were added to the cast: Sean Kelly (winner of U.S. Season 13) and Juli Grbac (the first winner of Project Runway Australia).

=== Episode 2: Top of the Class ===
Original airdate: January 9, 2019

"Project Runway" winners worldwide designed sophisticated graduation party outfits; actress Sofia Carson joined the judges.

- Guest Judges: Actresses Sofia Carson & Kiera Chaplin
- WINNER: Anthony Ryan Auld
- ELIMINATED: Sunny Fong

=== Episode 3: Buckle Up! ===
Original airdate: January 16, 2019

Season winners faced the "Unconventional Materials Challenge " on board an airplane; Tamron Hall and Martha Hunt were guest judges.

- Guest Judges: Tamron Hall & Martha Hunt
- WINNER: Irina Shabayeva
- ELIMINATED: Seth Aaron Henderson

=== Episode 4: Of Corsets Fashion ===
Original airdate: January 23, 2019

International All Stars created outerwear from underwear by transforming corsets into runway looks; Rebecca Minkoff and Olivia Culpo were guest judges.

- Guest Judges: Olivia Culpo & Rebecca Minkoff
- WINNER: Christina Exie
- ELIMINATED: Jasper Garvida

=== Episode 5: On The Prowl ===
Original airdate: January 30, 2019

The all-winners season continued with high fashion inspired by zoo animals; Peyton List and Joan Smalls were guest judges.

Animal	Designer
Porcupine	Michelle
Jaguar	Cynthia
Giraffe	Sean
Budgerigar	Anya
Alligator	Christina
Lion	Django
Rhea	Dmitry
Wallaby	Irina
Gibbon	Juli
Antelope	Biddell
Owl	Anthony Ryan

- Guest Judges: Model-actresses Peyton List & Joan Smalls
- WINNER: Michelle Lesniak
- ELIMINATED: Juli Grbac

=== Episode 6: Pedal To The Metal ===
Original airdate: February 6, 2019

Guests Wendy Williams, Danica Patrick, and Lily Aldridge joined the judges for red carpet fashion using metallic fabrics and unique textures.

- Guest Judges: Wendy Williams, Danica Patrick & Lily Aldridge
- WINNER: Sean Kelly
- ELIMINATED: Anya Ayoung-Chee

=== Episode 7: Pure Imagination ===
Original airdate: February 13, 2019

Willy Wonka inspired the designers to create new inventions in fashion for an avant-garde runway; guest judges were Andrew Rannells and Anna Camp.

- Guest Judges: Andrew Rannells & Anna Camp
- WINNER: Anthony Ryan Auld
- ELIMINATED: Django Steenbakker

=== Episode 8: Penneys From Heaven ===
Original airdate: February 20, 2019

Vanessa Williams and Jasmine Tookes were guest judges as Project Runway winners turned daytime separates into a nighttime look.

- Guest Judge: Vanessa Williams & Jasmine Tookes
- WINNER: Evan Biddell
- ELIMINATED: Cynthia Hayashi

=== Episode 9: All-Inclusive ===
Original airdate: February 27, 2019

Asia Kate Dillon joined the panel to judge gender-neutral streetwear that could be worn by anyone.

- Guest Judge: Asia Kate Dillon
- WINNER: Christina Exie
- ELIMINATED: Sean Kelly

=== Episode 10: Climate Quick Change ===
Original airdate: March 6, 2019

The participants battled extreme weather on and off the runway for resort wear that transitioned from one climate into another; Cynthia Erivo and Reem Acra were guest judges.

- Guest Judge: Cynthia Erivo & Reem Acra
- WINNER: Michelle Lesniak
- ELIMINATED: Christina Exie

=== Episode 11: Nina Says Don't Cry Over Spilt Silk ===
Original airdate: March 13, 2019

Nina Garcia challenged season winners to design modern ball gowns in luxurious silk; fashion icon Iris Apfel joined the judges.

- Guest Judge: Iris Apfel & Nina Garcia
- WINNER: Irina Shabayeva
- ELIMINATED: Anthony Ryan Auld

=== Episode 12: Modern Families ===
Original airdate: March 20, 2019

The remaining participants created fashion for modern families to secure their place in the finale; Marie Claire's Editor-in-Chief Anne Fulenwider was guest judge.

- Guest Judge: Anne Fulenwider
- WINNER: Evan Biddell
- ELIMINATED: None

=== Episode 13: All the World's a Runway ===
Original airdate: March 27, 2019

Actress Andrea Riseborough helped the judges crown a world champion as designers produced runway collections in front of New York's fashion elite.

- Guest Judge: Andrea Riseborough
- WINNER: Michelle Lesniak
- ELIMINATED: Evan Biddell, Irina Shabayeva, & Dmitry Sholokhov
