= Project Runway All Stars =

- Genre: Reality competition
- Starring: Angela Lindvall; Carolyn Murphy; Alyssa Milano; Joanna Coles; Georgina Chapman; Isaac Mizrahi; Zanna Roberts Rassi; Anne Fulenwider
- Country of origin: United States
- Original language: English
- No. of seasons: 7
- No. of episodes: 80

Production
- Executive producers: Rob Bagshaw; Tara Boneillo; Gil Goldschein; David Hillman; Jonathan Murray; Barbara Schneeweiss; Harvey Weinstein; Daniela Unruh; Bob Weinstein; Meryl Poster; Rob Sharenow
- Running time: 42 to 64 minutes
- Production companies: Bunim/Murray Productions; The Weinstein Company Television

Original release
- Network: Lifetime
- Release: January 5, 2012 – March 27, 2019

Related
- Project Runway

Project Runway All Stars is an American reality television series, and a spin-off of Project Runway, featuring returning designers competing for grand prizes. Angela Lindvall and Carolyn Murphy have each hosted one season before Alyssa Milano became the staple host of the past five seasons. As on Project Runway, the designers are judged by the host, two permanent judges and guest judges throughout the season. The permanent All Stars judges have been designers Georgina Chapman and Isaac Mizrahi. Joanna Coles mentored the designers throughout seasons one and two, Zanna Roberts Rassi replaced her in season three to five and Anne Fulenwider mentored seasons six and seven.

In May, 2016, Lifetime renewed Project Runway All Stars for two more seasons (six and seven) in a deal with The Weinstein Company. Following the 2017 allegations against Harvey Weinstein, The Weinstein Company filed for bankruptcy, Project Runway was picked up by its original broadcaster Bravo. In 2023, it was announced that an All-Star season would be produced and aired by Bravo. This 2023 edition is named as the 20th season of the main show, rather than another season of a separate show.

== Format ==
Same as Project Runway, All Stars follows the same format with challenges, judgings, and eliminations.

=== Judging ===
Judges on Project Runway All Stars
Judge	Season						
Judge	1	2	3	4	5	6	7
Angela Lindvall	Main						
Carolyn Murphy		Main					
Alyssa Milano			Main	Main	Main	Main	Main
Georgina Chapman	Main	Main	Main	Main	Main	Main	Main
Isaac Mizrahi	Main	Main	Main	Main	Main	Main	Main

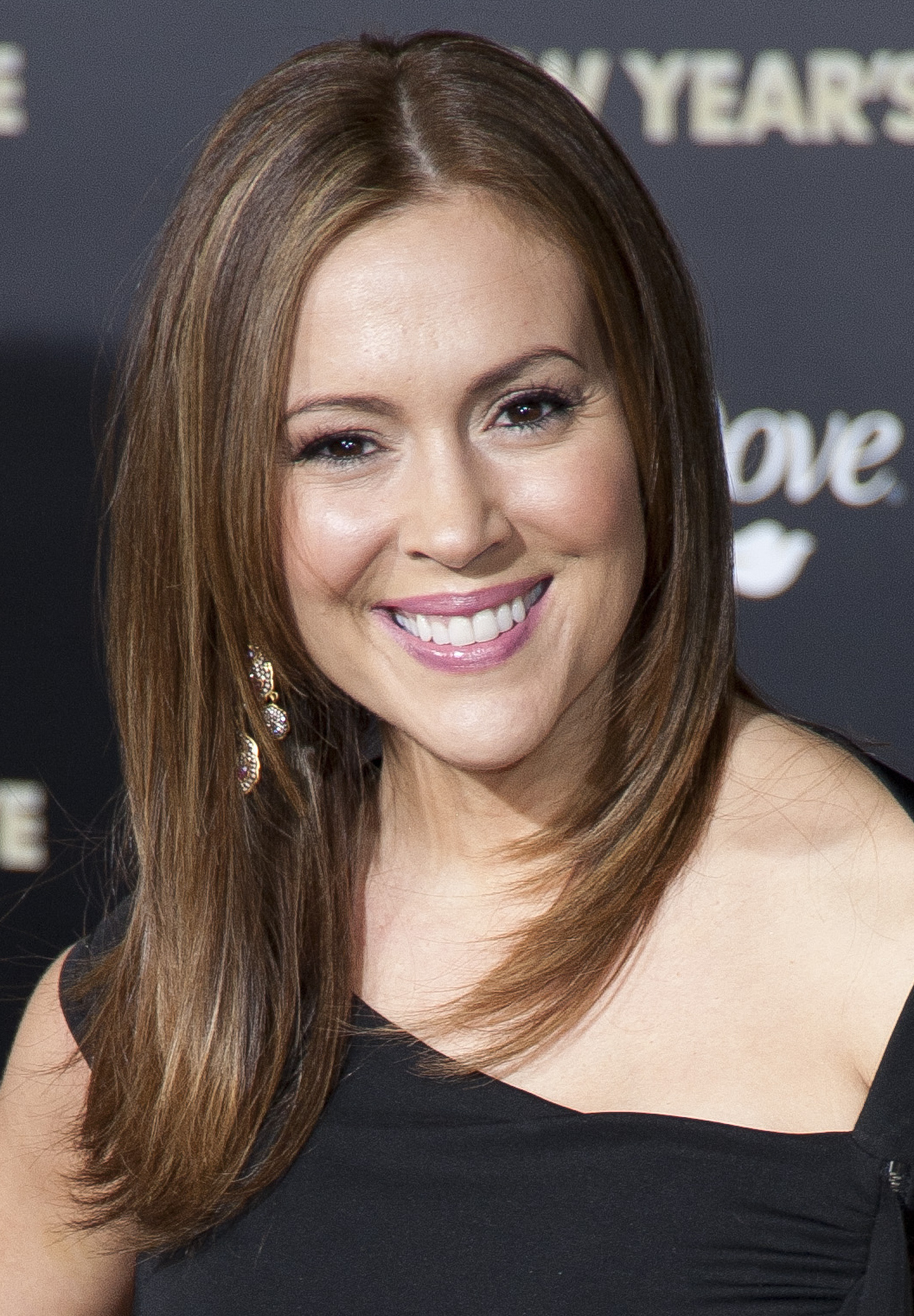
Alyssa Milano

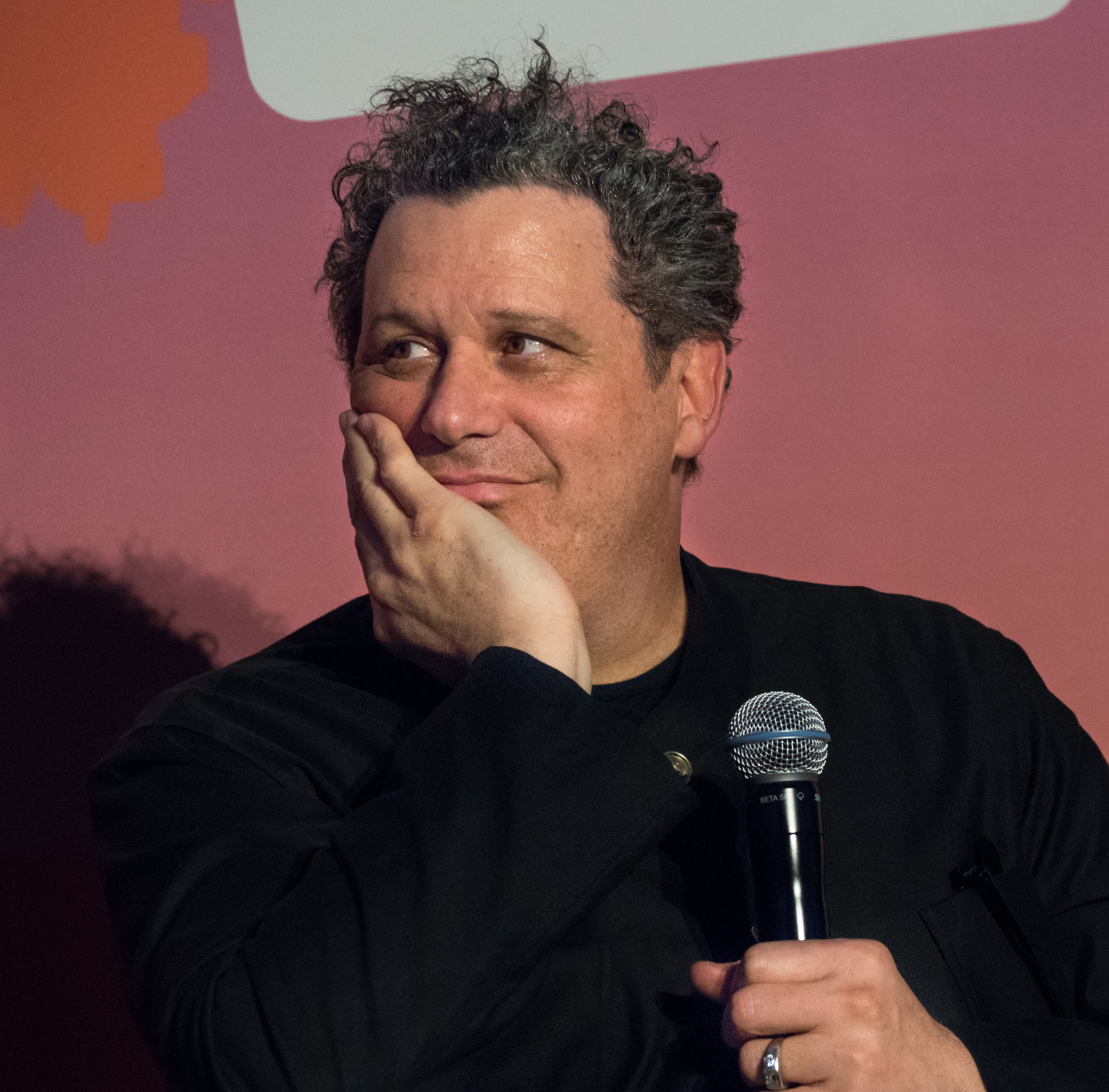
Isaac Mizrahi

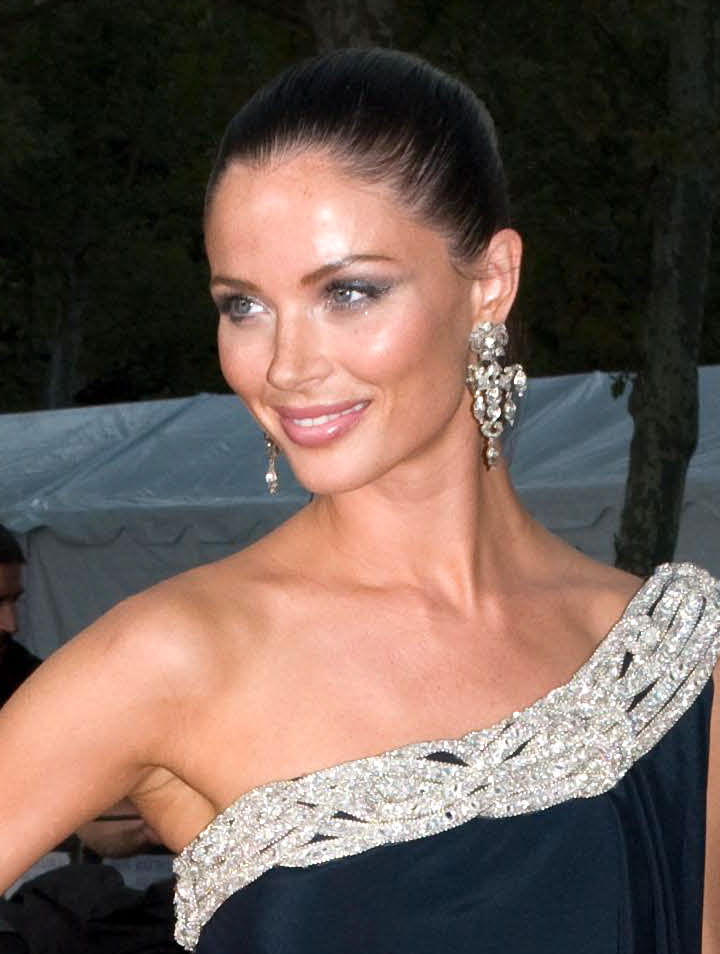
Georgina Chapman

Project Runway All Stars judges Alyssa Milano, Isaac Mizrahi, and Georgina Chapman

Judging duties on the first season of All Stars were taken up by host, Angela Lindvall, fashion designers Georgina Chapman, Isaac Mizrahi, and a fourth guest judge, usually a fashion designer, a supermodel, a celebrity, or a professional from an industry related to the challenge given. The second season saw the replacement of Lindvall as host and judge by supermodel Carolyn Murphy, who only remained with the show for one season also. American actress Alyssa Milano became the host and judge on All Stars in the third season, and has remained on the show for five seasons. Joanna Coles acts as a mentor to the designers, giving them suggestions and tips for their designs throughout the episode, but she does not participate in the judgings. Coles was the stable mentor for the first and second season, until Zanna Roberts Rassi replaced her in the third to fifth season. Anne Fulenwider took over for final two seasons.

== Series overview ==
Season	Premiere date	Finale date	Winner	Runner-up(s)	No. of contestants	Designer prizes
1	January 5, 2012	March 22, 2012	Mondo Guerra	Austin Scarlett	13	Exclusive designer's boutique in select Neiman Marcus stores and on NeimanMarcus.com; $100,000 in technology and office space to help grow their business from HP and Intel; $100,000 cash from L'Oreal Paris; A feature spread in Marie Claire, for which he serve as a guest editor for one year; A sewing and embroidery studio provided by Brother International
2	October 25, 2012	January 17, 2013	Anthony Ryan Auld	Emilio Sosa	13	A custom-branded capsule collection for Nine West, receive $150,000 in cash; A sewing and embroidery studio provided by Brother Sewing and Embroidery; An all-expenses-paid trip around the world to attend fashion week, courtesy of Laura Mercier; A technology suite provided by HP and Intel; A fashion spread in Marie Claire magazine; A position with Marie Claire magazine as Contributing Editor for one year.
3	October 24, 2013	January 9, 2014	Seth Aaron Henderson	Korto Momolu	11	A custom-branded capsule collection for QVC, receive $150,000 in cash; A sewing and embroidery studio provided by Brother Sewing and Embroidery; A year's supply and an all-expenses-paid trip for two to Southeast Asia, courtesy of resource®; A year's professional hair styling and photography for all of the designer's upcoming fashion shows, courtesy of Alterna Haircare; A year's worth of beauty products for their fashion shows as well as professional makeup artist services for their debut show, courtesy of Mary Kay Cosmetics; A technology suite provided by HP and Intel; A fashion spread in a contributing editor position for one year at Marie Claire Magazine
4	October 30, 2014	February 12, 2015	Dmitry Sholokhov	Sonjia Williams	14	A chance to create a capsule collection with QVC; Appear during QVC's Spring Fashion Week programming; A fashion spread in Marie Claire and a position at the magazine as Contributing Editor for one year; A special-guest stay at CHI Haircare's International conference in Cancun, Mexico; Product and staff for an entire year of runway shows; From Mary Kay, an entire year's worth of beauty products for fashion shows and professional makeup artist services for his/her debut show; A cash prize of $150,000; A complete custom sewing studio to launch his/her winning line from Brother Sewing and Embroidery.
5	February 11, 2016	May 5, 2016	Dom Streater	Kiniokahokula "Kini" Zamora	13	The opportunity to design an exclusive line of jewelry for BaubleBar.com; A capsule footwear collection by Chinese Laundry; A fashion spread in Marie Claire and a position at the magazine as contributing editor; A complete sewing studio to launch his/her winning line from Brothers Sewing and Embroidery; A cash prize of $100,000.
6	January 4, 2018	April 5, 2018	Anthony Williams	Fabio Costa; Stanley Hudson	16	A fashion spread in Marie Claire and a position at the magazine as Contributing Editor; A trip for two to London; Skin care and makeup from Rodial for their next show and beyond; Accessories and styling services from Intermix for their next collection; A complete sewing studio to launch his/her winning line from Brothers Sewing and Embroidery; A cash prize of $100,000.
7	January 2, 2019	March 27, 2019	Michelle Lesniak	Dmitry Sholokhov	14	An editorial fashion spread in Marie Claire and a position at the magazine as guest editor for one year; Opportunity to create a signature nail color for Butter London; A trip for two to London; $40,000 worth of sewing machines from Brothers Sewing and Embroidery; A cash prize of $100,000.

=== All Stars: Season 1 ===
Lifetime's first season of Project Runway All Stars consisted of twelve one-hour episodes featuring 13 past contestants competing in a series of challenges. The airdate was set for November 3, 2011, but was pushed back to January 5, 2012. The season was hosted by Angela Lindvall and the recurring judges were fashion designers Isaac Mizrahi and Georgina Chapman. The winner was Mondo Guerra.

=== All Stars: Season 2 ===
The second season of All-Stars began airing October 25, 2012. Carolyn Murphy replaced Angela Lindvall as host, while Isaac Mizrahi and Georgina Chapman were back for Season 2 as judges. Season 2 also featuring 13 designers, and Anthony Ryan Auld was the winner.

=== All Stars: Season 3 ===
It was announced in June 2013 that a third All Stars season was in the works with Alyssa Milano as the host. Isaac Mizrahi and Georgina Chapman were also returning as judges. Zanna Roberts Rassi, the senior fashion editor for Marie Claire, joined this season as the mentor. The season started production in late June 2013, and premiered on October 24, 2013. Mary Kay Cosmetics is the supplier for all makeup used by the designers for this season, and it is their first time to be featured on the series.. Seth Aaron Henderson was the winner among 11 participating designers.

=== All Stars: Season 4 ===
Reports of a fourth season of All Stars, once again hosted by Milano, were confirmed on social media by Nicole "Snooki" Polizzi, who served as a guest judge. The cast of 14 designers was revealed on September 16, with a premiere date set for October 30, 2014. Dmitry Sholokhov was the winner.

=== All Stars: Season 5 ===
The fifth season of All Stars premiered in the beginning of 2016. Alyssa Milano returned as host as well as Isaac Mizrahi, Georgina Chapman and Zanna Roberts Rassi. Season 5 features 13 designers, and Dom Streater was the winner.

=== All Stars: Season 6 ===
The sixth season of All Stars premiered in January 2018. Alyssa Milano returned in her role as host, and Isaac Mizrahi and Georgina Chapman remain regular judges. Anne Fulenwider mentored the designers. Season 6 features eight new All Stars designers, and eight designers who have competed on All Stars previously. The winner of this season was Anthony Williams.

=== All Stars: Season 7 ===
The seventh season of All Stars premiered in January 2019. Alyssa Milano returned in her role as host, and Isaac Mizrahi and Georgina Chapman remain regular judges. Anne Fulenwider mentored the designers. The season featured seven former U.S. winners and seven international winners. The winner was Michelle Lesniak.

== Contestants ==
Original season	All Stars 1	All Stars 2	All Stars 3	All Stars 4	All Stars 5	All Stars 6 Rookies vs. Vets	All Stars 7 Global Champion	Total
1	Austin Scarlett	Wendy Pepper^{†}	N/A	N/A	Daniel Franco	N/A	N/A	3
2	Kara Janx	Andrae Gonzalo	N/A	N/A	Daniel Franco	N/A	N/A	3
3	—N/a	Uli Herzner; Kayne Gillaspie	Jeffrey Sebelia; Mychael Knight^{†}	N/A	N/A	N/A	N/A	4
4	Rami Kashou; Kathleen "Sweet P" Vaughn; Elisa Jimenez	—N/a	—N/a	Chris March^{†}	N/A	N/A	N/A	4
5	Kenley Collins; Jerell Scott	Stephen "Suede" Baum	Korto Momolu	N/A	Stella Zotis	N/A	N/A	5
6	Gordana Gehlhausen	Althea Harper	Irina Shabayeva	N/A	N/A	N/A	Irina Shabayeva	3
7	Mila Hermanovski; Anthony Williams	Emilio Sosa	**Seth Aaron Henderson**	Jay Sario	N/A	**Anthony Williams** (veteran)	Seth Aaron Henderson	5
8	**Mondo Guerra**; Michael Costello; April Johnston	Ivy Higa; Carlos Casanova; Peach Carr	Ari South	N/A	Valerie Mayen	Ari South (veteran); Carlos Casanova (veteran)	—N/a	8
9	N/A	**Anthony Ryan Auld**; Joshua McKinley; Laura Kathleen Planck	Viktor Luna	N/A	N/A	Joshua McKinley (veteran); Kimberly Goldson (rookie)	Anthony Ryan Auld; Anya Ayoung-Chee	6
10	N/A	N/A	Elena Slivnyak; Christopher Palu; Melissa Fleis	**Dmitry Sholokhov**; Sonjia Williams; Fabio Costa; Gunnar Deatherage	N/A	Fabio Costa (veteran); Melissa Fleis (veteran)	Dmitry Sholokhov	7
11	N/A	N/A	Daniel Esquivel	Michelle Lesniak Franklin; Samantha Black; Benjamin Mach; Kate Pankoke; Patricia Michaels	Layana Aguilar	Stanley Hudson (rookie); Amanda Valentine (rookie)	**Michelle Lesniak Franklin**	9
12	N/A	N/A	N/A	Helen Castillo; Justin LeBlanc; Kate Pankoke; Alexandria von Bromssen	**Dom Streater**; Ken Laurence; Alexander Pope	Helen Castillo (veteran); Ken Laurence (veteran)	N/A	7
Under the Gunn	N/A	N/A	N/A	N/A	Sam Donovan; Asha Daniels	—N/a	N/A	2
13	N/A	N/A	N/A	N/A	Kiniokahokula "Kini" Zamora; Emily Payne; Fäde zu Grau; Mitchell Perry	Char Glover (rookie); Amanda Valentine (rookie)	Sean Kelly	7
14	N/A	N/A	N/A	N/A	N/A	Edmond Newton (rookie); Merline Labissiere (rookie); Candice Cuoco (rookie); Kelly Dempsey (rookie)	—N/a	4
International Editions	N/A	N/A	N/A	N/A	N/A	—N/a	Evan Biddell (Canada); Christina Exie (Australia); Sunny Fong (Canada); Jasper Garvida (England); Juli Grbac (Australia); Cynthia Hayashi (Brazil); Django Steenbakker (Netherlands)	7
Total	**13**	**13**	**11**	**14**	**13**	**16**	**14**	

Legend
- Designers' names in **bold** indicate winners in their respective All-Star seasons.
- Designers' names in italic indicate finalists in their respective All-Star seasons.
