= Project Runway All Stars season 4 =

Project Runway All Stars
- Season 4
- Hosted by: Alyssa Milano
- Judges: Georgina Chapman; Isaac Mizrahi
- No. of tasks: 13
- No. of contestants: 14
- Winner: Dmitry Sholokhov
- No. of episodes: 13

Release
- Original network: Lifetime
- Original release: October 30, 2014 – February 12, 2015

Season chronology
- ← Previous; Season 3 Next → Season 5

Project Runway All Stars (Season 4) is the fourth season of the Project Runway spin-off series Project Runway All Stars. It features 14 designers from previous seasons of the original series with Alyssa Milano returning as both host and judge. TV fashion correspondent and Marie Claire's Senior Fashion Editor Zanna Roberts Rassi returns to mentor contestants.

Lifetime Network's website, mylifetime.com, reveals the winner's prize package as: a chance to create a capsule collection with QVC and appear during QVC’s Spring Fashion Week programming; a fashion spread in Marie Claire and a position at the magazine as Contributing Editor for one year; a special guest stay at CHI Haircare's International conference in Cancun, Mexico, plus product and staff for an entire year of runway shows; from Mary Kay, an entire year’s worth of beauty products for fashion shows and professional makeup artist services for his/her debut show; a cash prize of $150,000 and a complete custom sewing studio to launch his/her winning line from Brother Sewing and Embroidery.

== Judges ==
In addition to Alyssa Milano both Georgina Chapman and Isaac Mizrahi return as judges for this season. Some of the celebrity guest judges for Project Runway All Stars Season 4 are Emmy® Award nominee Laverne Cox of Orange Is the New Black, Emmy winner Debra Messing who has a new television show The Mysteries of Laura, Modern Family's Ariel Winter, Academy Award® winner Mira Sorvino, singer Nicole Scherzinger, Emmy nominated host Cat Deeley, reality stars Snooki and JWoww, celebrity photographer Nigel Barker and QVC® Program Host Lisa Robertson. Fashion Designers Betsey Johnson, Michael Bastian, Elie Tahari and Ivanka Trump served as guest judges. "Project Runway" judges Nina Garcia and Zac Posen made special appearances.

== Contestants ==
Contestant	Hometown	Original season(s)	Original placement(s)	Finish	Outcome
Patricia Michaels	Taos Pueblo, New Mexico	Season 11	2	Episode 1	14
Alexandria von Bromssen	San Mateo, California	Season 12	2	Episode 2	13
Chris March†^{1}	San Francisco, California	Season 4	4	Episode 3	12
Kate Pankoke	Chicago, Illinois	Season 11	9	Episode 4	11
Kate Pankoke	Chicago, Illinois	Season 12	6	Episode 4	11
Benjamin Mach	London, England	Season 11	11	Episode 5	10
Gunnar Deatherage	Louisville, Kentucky	Season 9	20-17	Episode 6	9
Gunnar Deatherage	Louisville, Kentucky	Season 10	8	Episode 6	9
Samantha Black	Fairfield, Connecticut	Season 11	7	Episode 8	8
Justin LeBlanc	Raleigh, North Carolina	Season 12	3	Episode 9	7
Jay Sario	San Francisco, California	Season 7	4	Episode 10	6
Fabio Costa	Brooklyn, New York City, New York	Season 10	2	Episode 11	5
Michelle Lesniak	Portland, Oregon	Season 11	1	Episode 12	4
Helen Castillo	Union City, New Jersey	Season 12	5	Episode 13	3
Sonjia Williams	Queens, New York	Season 10	5	Episode 13	2
Dmitry Sholokhov	Navapolatsk, Belarus	Season 10	1	Episode 13	1

^1: March also competed on the "Project Runway All-Star Challenge", and was third runner-up.

== Designer Progress ==
Designer Elimination Table
Designers	1	2	3	4	5	6	7	8	9	10	11	12	13	Eliminated Episode
Dmitry	IN	IN	HIGH	HIGH	HIGH	IN	IN	HIGH	WIN	HIGH	LOW	WIN	WINNER	4 Seasons in One Finale
Sonjia	IN	IN	WIN	HIGH	IN	WIN	IN	HIGH	IN	WIN	HIGH	HIGH	RUNNER-UP	4 Seasons in One Finale
Helen	IN	IN	LOW	WIN	IN	HIGH	LOW	IN	HIGH	HIGH	WIN	LOW	3RD PLACE	4 Seasons in One Finale
Michelle	LOW	LOW	IN	IN	IN	HIGH	HIGH	LOW	HIGH	LOW	LOW	OUT		Some Like it Hot Dog
Fabio	WIN	IN	LOW	IN	WIN	LOW	WIN	IN	LOW	LOW	OUT			Always the Bridesmaid
Jay	IN	HIGH	IN	IN	LOW	IN	HIGH	LOW	LOW	OUT				Versatile Tops and Bottoms
Justin	IN	WIN	IN	IN	HIGH	LOW	LOW	WIN	OUT					Sketching with Sharks
Samantha	IN	IN	HIGH	IN	LOW	IN	LOW	OUT						Making a Splash
Gunnar	IN	IN	IN	LOW	IN	OUT								Luck Be a Lady
Benjamin	HIGH	IN	IN	LOW	OUT									Desiging for the Duchess
Kate	LOW	HIGH	IN	OUT										Wear Your Heart on Your Sleeve
Chris	HIGH	LOW	OUT											Something Wicked This Way Comes
Alexandria	IN	OUT												The Art of Construction
Patricia	OUT													Made in Manhattan

The designer won season four of Project Runway All Stars
The designer won the challenge.
The designer came in second but did not win the challenge.
The designer had one of the highest scores for the challenge but did not win.
The designer had one of the lowest scores for the challenge but was not eliminated.
The designer was in the bottom two but was not eliminated.
The designer lost the challenge and was eliminated from the competition.

== Models ==
- Brianna Benavides
- Kristina Borgyugova
- Kasey Clare
- Jennifer Daniel
- Bruna Marx
- Collene Mills
- Sharlene Radlein
- Alyona Shishmareva
- Jennifer Stosz
- Nastasia Scott
- Sydney Mills

== Episodes ==
=== Episode 1: Made in Manhattan ===
Original airdate: October 30, 2014

- All-star designers create fashions inspired by New York's uptown or downtown scene in the Season 4 premiere.
- Guest Judge: Ivanka Trump
- WINNER: Fabio
- ELIMINATED: Patricia

=== Episode 2: The Art of Construction ===
Original airdate: November 6, 2014

- A construction site inspires the designers to create feminine styles from masculine materials.
- Guest Judge: Snooki, JWoww, & Elie Tahari
- WINNER: Justin
- ELIMINATED: Alexandria

=== Episode 3: Something Wicked This Way Comes ===
Original airdate: November 13, 2014

- The designers have access to Broadway's "Wicked" to fashion couture-inspired styles.
- Guest Judge: Betsey Johnson (sitting in for Georgina Chapman) & Ariel Winter
- WINNER: Sonjia
- ELIMINATED: Chris
- Note: This episode the designers were tasked with creating a dress that represented a "good" or "wicked" theme. They were randomly paired to design against each other in Fashion Face-offs, with a "good" design going against a "wicked" design. The match-ups were:

Team Good	Team Wicked
Fabio	Justin
Gunnar	Dmitry
Helen	Benjamin
Jay	Samantha
Michelle	Chris
Sonjia	Kate

The designer won their face off.

=== Episode 4: Wear Your Heart on Your Sleeve ===
Original airdate: November 20, 2014

- The all-star clothiers spin out flashy party dresses inspired by their personal relationships.
- Guest Judge: Nina Garcia, Seth Aaron Henderson (sitting in for Georgina Chapman), & Danielle Bernstein
- WINNER: Helen
- ELIMINATED: Kate

=== Episode 5: Designing for the Duchess ===
Original airdate: December 4, 2014

- The clothiers meet British royalty in London as inspiration to create winter fashions.
- Guest Judge: Debra Messing (sitting in for Georgina Chapman) & Karen Elson
- WINNER: Fabio
- ELIMINATED: Benjamin

=== Episode 6: Luck Be a Lady ===
Original airdate: December 11, 2014

- A fashion gamble tests the all-star designers.
- Guest Judge: Michael Bastian
- WINNER: Sonjia
- ELIMINATED: Gunnar

Designer	Fabric	Event
Dmitry	Velvet	Gallery Opening
Fabio	Denim	Masquerade Ball
Gunnar	Brocade	Masquerade Ball
Helen	Brocade	Awards Ceremony
Jay	Denim	Sunday Brunch
Justin	Silk	Gallery Opening
Michelle	Lace	Gallery Opening
Samantha	Brocade	Awards Ceremony
Sonjia	Brocade	Bachelorette Party Girl

=== Episode 7: Mix and Match.com ===
Original airdate: December 18, 2014

- The clothiers fashion looks for dating-site singles.
- Guest Judge: Laverne Cox
- WINNER: Fabio
- ELIMINATED: None

=== Episode 8: Making a Splash ===
Original airdate: January 8, 2015

- The designers create elegant resort wear with swimsuits. Before that, they plunge into a major challenge when they must collect their fabric from under the water.
- Guest Judge: Nigel Barker
- WINNER: Justin
- ELIMINATED: Samantha

=== Episode 9: Sketching with Sharks ===
Original airdate: January 15, 2015

- The designers must use marine life as inspiration for avant-garde fashion. One designer doubles the budget by swimming with sharks.
- Guest Judge: Nicole Scherzinger
- WINNER: Dmitry
- ELIMINATED: Justin

=== Episode 10: Versatile Tops and Bottoms ===
Original airdate: January 22, 2015

- New York City's Times Square is the backdrop when the designers learn about the business of fashion and style combinations.
- Guest Judge: Lisa Robertson & George Kotsiopoulos
- WINNER: Sonjia
- ELIMINATED: Jay

=== Episode 11: Always the Bridesmaid ===
Original airdate: January 29, 2015

- The designers must use Marchesa's showroom as inspiration to create bridesmaids' dresses for a wedding ceremony on the runway.
- Guest Judge: Cat Deeley
- WINNER: Helen
- ELIMINATED: Fabio

=== Episode 12: Some Like It Hot Dog ===
Original airdate: February 5, 2015 Viewers (million): 1.66

- Red-carpet gowns are fashioned as inspired by the beauty of Marilyn Monroe. Also: A Hollywood legend visits the workroom.
- Guest Judge: Sophia Amoruso
- WINNER: Dmitry
- ELIMINATED: Michelle

=== Episode 13: 4 Seasons in One Finale ===
Original airdate: February 12, 2015
Viewers (millions): 1.57

- The winner is crowned in the Season 4 finale. Included: The finalists create collections representing the four seasons of the year.
- Guest Judge: Mira Sorvino & Zac Posen
- WINNER: Dmitry
- ELIMINATED: Helen & Sonjia
