= Project Runway All Stars season 3 =

Project Runway All Stars
- Season 3
- Hosted by: Alyssa Milano
- Judges: Georgina Chapman; Isaac Mizrahi
- No. of tasks: 10
- No. of contestants: 11
- Winner: Seth Aaron Henderson
- No. of episodes: 10

Release
- Original network: Lifetime
- Original release: October 24, 2013 – January 9, 2014

Season chronology
- ← Previous; Season 2 Next → Season 4

Project Runway All Stars (Season 3) is the third season of the Project Runway spin-off series Project Runway All Stars. It features 11 designers from previous seasons of the original series with Alyssa Milano acting as the new host, taking over Carolyn Murphy's role in season 2. Georgina Chapman and Isaac Mizrahi returned as judges for this season. Zanna Roberts Rassi replaced Joanna Coles, mentoring contestants. The season premiered on Lifetime on October 24, 2013.

Guest judges included Abigail Breslin, Kristin Chenoweth, Gabourey Sidibe, Elisabeth Moss, Nick Cannon, Debbie Harry, Bar Refaeli, Gayle King, Nate Berkus, and Michael Urie. Original series judge Nina Garcia and newcomer judge Zac Posen, along with previous Runway winners Christian Siriano (season 4) and Anya Ayoung-Chee (season 9), as well as two All Stars winners Mondo Guerra and Anthony Ryan Auld appeared. Marge Simpson also made a special appearance.

== Judges ==
American model and actress Alyssa Milano serves as the host as well as a judge. Designers Isaac Mizrahi and Georgina Chapman also judge the 11 returning designers which, for the first time, include winners of the original series as cast members.

== Contestants ==
Contestant	Hometown	Original season(s)	Original placement(s)	Finish	Outcome
Ari South	Honolulu, Hawaii	Season 8	3	Episode 1	11
Daniel Esquivel	Austin, Texas	Season 11	4	Episode 2	10
Melissa Fleis	San Francisco, California	Season 10	3	Episode 3	9
Mychael Knight†	Atlanta, Georgia	Season 3	4	Episode 5	8
Jeffrey Sebelia	Los Angeles, California	Season 3	1	Episode 6	7
Irina Shabayeva	New York, New York	Season 6	1	Episode 7	6
Viktor Luna	New York, New York	Season 9	3	Episode 8	5
Christopher Palu	Massapequa, New York	Season 10	4	Episode 9	4
Elena Slivnyak	San Francisco, California	Season 10	6	Episode 10	3
Korto Momolu	Little Rock, Arkansas	Season 5	2	Episode 10	2
Seth Aaron Henderson	Vancouver, Washington	Season 7	1	Episode 10	1

=== Models ===
- Raychael Arianna Jackson
- Noelle McKenzie
- Tatjana Sinkevica
- Kelly Brown
- Manon Krol
- Andrea "Shei" Phan
- Alice Contreiras
- Brianna "Nana" Flores
- Kelly Thomas
- Jenny Kafka
- Amy Row

== Designer Progress ==
Designer Elimination Table
Designers	1	2	3	4	5	6	7	8	9	10	Eliminated Episode
Seth Aaron	HIGH	IN	IN	IN	LOW	LOW	HIGH	IN	WIN	WINNER	10 – Finale: Are U.N. or Are You Out?
Korto	IN	IN	LOW	LOW	IN	HIGH	WIN	WIN	LOW	RUNNER-UP	10 – Finale: Are U.N. or Are You Out?
Elena	WIN	HIGH	HIGH	HIGH	IN	HIGH	LOW	HIGH	HIGH	3RD PLACE	10 – Finale: Are U.N. or Are You Out?
Christopher	IN	IN	HIGH	WIN	HIGH	LOW	HIGH	LOW	OUT		9 – Fashion Cents
Viktor	LOW	IN	WIN	HIGH	LOW	IN	LOW	OUT			8 – Nina's Trending
Irina	IN	HIGH	IN	IN	HIGH	WIN	OUT				7 – As Sewn on TV
Jeffrey	HIGH	LOW	LOW	LOW	WIN	OUT					6 – Marge Madness
Mychael	IN	WIN	IN	LOW	OUT						5 – Partners In Crime
Melissa	LOW	LOW	OUT								3 – Sip Into Something Sexier
Daniel	IN	OUT									2 – Bitten by the Fashion Bug
Ari	OUT										1 – You Got Punked!

The designer won Project Runway All Stars.
The designer won the challenge.
The designer came in second but did not win the challenge.
The designer had one of the highest scores for the challenge but did not win.
The designer had a low score, but was not in the bottom two.
The designer was in the bottom two but was not eliminated.
The designer lost the challenge and was eliminated from the competition.

== Rate The Runway Results ==
Fan Vote Table
Designer	1	2	3	4	5	6	7	8	9	10
Seth Aaron	HIGH	IN	IN	IN	HIGH	LOW	HIGH	HIGH	WIN	WINNER
Korto	IN	HIGH	IN	LOW	WIN	LOW	LOW	WIN	LOW	OUT
Elena	WIN	IN	HIGH	IN	IN	HIGH	LOW	OUT	OUT	OUT
Christopher	IN	IN	WIN	WIN	LOW	IN	WIN	HIGH	HIGH	
Viktor	LOW	IN	HIGH	HIGH	LOW	HIGH	OUT	LOW		
Irina	IN	HIGH	IN	HIGH	IN	WIN	HIGH			
Jeffrey	HIGH	LOW	OUT	LOW	HIGH	OUT				
Mychael	IN	WIN	LOW	OUT	OUT					
Melissa	LOW	LOW	LOW							
Daniel	IN	OUT								
Ari	OUT									

== Episodes ==
=== Episode 1: You Got Punked! ===
Original airdate: October 24, 2013

- Fashion-forward punk looks are created in the Season 3 opener.
- Guest Judge: Debbie Harry
- WINNER: Elena
- ELIMINATED: Ari

=== Episode 2: Bitten by the Fashion Bug ===
Original airdate: October 31, 2013

- Arthropods inspire avant-garde fashions.
- Guest Judges: Anya Ayoung-Chee & Jennifer Meyer
- WINNER: Mychael
- ELIMINATED: Daniel

=== Episode 3: Sip Into Something Sexier ===
Original airdate: November 7, 2013

- The designers have to create high-end cocktail dresses and seek their inspirations at Jay Z's 40/40 Club.
- Guest Judges: Nate Berkus & Rebecca Minkoff
- WINNER: Viktor
- ELIMINATED: Melissa

=== Episode 4: Keepin' It Classy ===
Original airdate: November 14, 2013

- The designers have to create a high impact fashion look from unconventional material found in an elementary school.
- Guest Judges: Michael Urie & Gabourey Sidibe
- WINNER: Christopher
- ELIMINATED: None

=== Episode 5: Partners In Crime ===
Original airdate: November 21, 2013

- Working in teams of two the designers have to create young modern looks inspired by Lifetime's new series Bonnie & Clyde of '30s.
- Guest Judges: Bar Refaeli & Elie Tahari & Austin Scarlett (sitting in for Georgina Chapman )
- WINNER: Jeffrey
- ELIMINATED: Mychael

=== Episode 6: Marge Madness ===
Original airdate: December 5, 2013

- On November 28, 2013 no episode was aired due to Thanksgiving in the United States.
- Marge Simpson from The Simpsons asks the Allstar Designers to design an exciting night dress for a date with Homer.
- Guest Judges: Anthony Ryan Auld (sitting in for Georgina Chapman )& Stacey Bendet & Abigail Breslin
- WINNER: Irina
- ELIMINATED: Jeffrey

=== Episode 7: As Sewn On T.V. ===
Original airdate: December 12, 2013

- Only six designers remain. At headquarter of QVC they are asked to design a red carpet dress.
- Guest Judges: Mondo Guerra (sitting in for Georgina Chapman ) & QVC® Program Host Lisa Robertson & Elisabeth Moss
- WINNER: Korto
- ELIMINATED: Irina

=== Episode 8: Nina's Trending ===
Original airdate: December 19, 2013

- The remaining designers meet with fashion bloggers to discuss 2014 trends.
- Guest Judges: Nina Garcia & Christian Siriano (sitting in for Georgina Chapman ) & Francisco Costa
- WINNER: Korto
- ELIMINATED: Viktor

=== Episode 9: Fashion Cents ===
Original airdate: January 2, 2014

- The remaining four designers have to create a ready to wear look in order to make it to the finale.
- Guest Judges: Michelle Smith & Nick Cannon & Kristin Chenoweth
- WINNER: Seth Aaron
- ELIMINATED: Christopher

=== Episode 10: Finale: Are U.N. or Are You Out? ===
Original airdate: January 9, 2014

- In the Season 3 finale, the designers showcase their collections at a VIP runway show at the United Nations Headquarters, after which the winner is revealed.
- Guest Judges: Gayle King & Zac Posen
- WINNER: Seth Aaron
- ELIMINATED: Korto & Elena
