= Irina Shabayeva =

American fashion designer

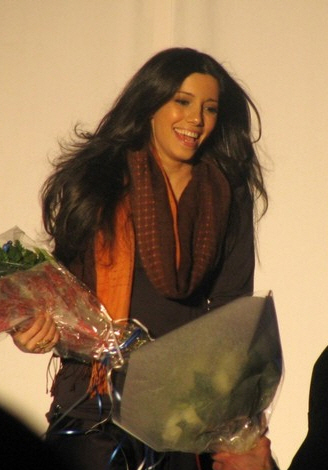
- Shabayeva in 2010
- Education: BFA from Parsons School of Design
- Occupation(s): fashion designer, artist, philanthropist
- Television: Project Runway Season 6 (Winner)

Irina Shabayeva (Russian: Ирина Шабаева, Georgian: ირინა შაბაევა) is the winner of the sixth season of Project Runway along with her model, Kalyn Hemphill.

== Personal life ==
Shabayeva is originally from Georgia and is of Georgian, Jewish and Russian heritage. She has stated her favorite designer is Jean Paul Gaultier, and credits her success to her feminine instincts and her diverse heritage.

== Project Runway ==
Shabayeva appeared in season six of Project Runway and won three challenges (Episode 5, "Fashion Headliners", Episode 7 "The Sky is the Limit", and Episode 10 "Around the World in Two Days). She ultimately won the season with her New York-inspired woman warrior collection. The season six finale notably featured three designers (Shabayeva along with Carol Hannah Whitfield and Althea Harper) that had not been in the bottom three during the whole season.

== After Project Runway ==
Shabayeva has created many ready to wear and couture collections. She designed Selena Gomez's butterfly dress for the 2011 People's Choice Awards. Carrie Underwood wore Irina Shabayeva's grey ombre gown on the cover of her album Blown Away.

In 2013, Shabayeva became a contestant on the third season of Project Runway All Stars and placed 6th in the competition.

In 2015, Irina Shabayeva launched a lingerie collection in addition to continuing ready to wear and couture collection. Irina also has dedicated a lot of other time to working with numerous charities. In the past she has partnered with the MacDella Cooper Foundation to benefit Ebola, The Freedom Ladder to end child trafficking and The Carol Galvin Foundation to aid women with cancer. On February 12, 2016 she showed a couture and lingerie collection at the Monarch in NYC to benefit Women's cancer research.

In 2019, Shabayeva competed in Season 7 of Project Runway All Stars, that featured a cast of previous winners only. She came in third place, behind Dmitry Sholokhov and Michelle Lesniak.

Preceded by Leanne Marshall	Project Runway winner Irina Shabayeva	Succeeded by Seth Aaron Henderson
