= Steven Rosengard =

American fashion designer

- Education: Columbia College Chicago; University of Wisconsin–Madison
- Occupation: fashion designer
- Television: Project Runway Season 4 (11th place)

Steven Rosengard is an independent American fashion designer. He designs his eponymous line in Chicago, Illinois, and was a contestant in season four of the Bravo reality television show Project Runway.

== Childhood and education ==
Rosengard grew up in the south suburbs of Chicago and is the youngest of four children. A graduate of Morgan Park Academy, Rosengard entered the fashion design program at Columbia College Chicago. After one year, Rosengard left Columbia to travel abroad; upon returning from travels to France, Italy, and England, Rosengard enrolled in the Dutch Studies program at the University of Wisconsin–Madison.

== Career ==
In 2005, Rosengard began working with clients to create custom couture under his eponymous label. Featured in Chicago Fashion Week, Rosengard emerged as a designer on the Chicago fashion scene before his appearance on Project Runway, a reality show on Bravo in which designers compete against each other in a variety of fashion challenges.

In 2006, Rosengard auditioned for season three of Project Runway and made it through all rounds of auditioning, but in the end was selected to be an alternate. His audition video, along with footage from his actual audition with Tim Gunn and Nick Verreos was shown on "Road to Runway: Season 3 - Casting Special".

In 2007, Rosengard was selected to be a contestant on the fourth season of Project Runway. The designers competed for the opportunity to show their Spring 2008 collection at New York Fashion Week, an editorial feature in Elle magazine, $100,000 (furnished by TRESemmé) to start their own line, the opportunity to sell their line on Bluefly, and a 2008 Saturn Astra. Rosengard was eliminated in the season's fifth episode.

Upon his return to Chicago after filming for Project Runway ended, Rosengard designed "The Perfect Rose Dress" for Gaga's, a Chicago-based boutique specializing in children's formal attire. The dress was featured on In the Loop with iVillage.
