= Hannah Lander =

Dominican fashion designer based in New York City

- Born: Dominican Republic
- Occupation: Fashion designer

Hannah Lander (formerly Lander) , is a New York City based Dominican Republic fashion designer. Her designs have been featured in Model Latina and worn by celebrities such as Olivia Munn. She was selected as 2010's "Breakout Designer" by Time Out magazine.

== Education ==
Lander attended Altos de Chavón design school in the Dominican Republic. She obtained a full scholarship to study at the Parsons The New School for Design in Manhattan.

== Career ==
Lander worked for renown Mexican designer Rogelio Velasco during an internship at his design house, Velasco Couture. Lander has also collaborated with other designers including Derek Lam, Proenza Schouler, and Ralph Lauren. In 2007, she was a finalist in the Gap Design competition and she also won the Nordstrom competition that same year. She produced and sold her collection from this competition.

After graduation from Parson she worked with Donna Karan, up to December 2008. She subsequently launched her self-titled contemporary line. Lander was featured in the iFashion Network Spring 2010 show as part of New York Fashion Week. She was later nominated by Time Out magazine as the "Breakout Designer" for 2010. She appeared on the Mercedes-Benz sponsored New York Fashion Week's Fall 2013 show, held from February 7–14.

Lander was a contestant in the 13th season of the reality TV show Project Runway, placing 13th in the competition.

== Personal life ==
Following her appearance on Project Runway, Lander later publicly transitioned.
