= Elisa Jimenez =

American fashion designer

- Born: 1965 (age 59–60); El Paso, Texas, U.S.
- Education: University of Texas at El Paso; University of Arizona
- Occupation: fashion designer
- Television: Project Runway Season 4 (10th place) Project Runway: All Stars Season 1 (13th place)
- Parent(s): Luis Jiménez; Vicky Balcou

Elisa Jimenez (born 1965) is an interdisciplinary artist, primarily in fashion design but also including writing, drawing, painting, performance art, and art installation. Her main ongoing project is called "The Hunger World," a world of marionettes ranging from 2 inches to 30 feet in height.

== Childhood and education ==
Born in El Paso, Texas, Jimenez is the daughter of sculptor Luis Jiménez and graphic designer Vicky Balcou. By the age of five, she was sewing doll clothes and fixing her own hems.

She attended the University of Texas at Austin where she earned a Bachelor of Fine Arts degree with a minor in anthropology. She went on to earn a Master of Fine Arts degree from the University of Arizona.

== Career ==
After her father's sudden death in 2006, Jimenez moved to Santa Fe, NM from New York City.

Vogue discovered Jimenez as "the scoop" and consistently has acknowledged her as being at the forefront of the new avant-garde as well as one of the top 10 American Designers in the independent realm. Her designs have appeared in the pages of Harper's Bazaar, Elle, Dutch, Black Book, Paper Mag, Jane, and Trace.

She has worked for a number of actors, musicians, films and television programs, including: Melissa Auf der Maur, Cher for her Believe album, Jennifer Connelly for her character in Requiem for a Dream, Marisa Tomei, Courtney Love, Sarah Jessica Parker, Sex and the City, Pink, Cameron Diaz, and art photographer Cindy Sherman. Jimenez was invited to be in the Barbican Gallery's exhibit and book Rapture: Art and Fashion Since the 1970s, curated by Chris Townsend of London.

In 2007 Jimenez was a contestant on the fourth season of Project Runway, a reality show on Bravo in which designers compete against each other in various fashion challenges to win $100,000 to create their own fashion line, among other prizes. Jimenez had been picked to appear on the first season of the show but opted out to avoid separating from her young daughter and because of a scheduling conflict. Jimenez was eliminated in the show's sixth episode, "Eye Candy."

In a Project Runway testimonial, Jimenez disclosed that she was the victim of a motor-vehicle impact as a pedestrian. She ran into the path of a Peugeot 205 and cracked her skull open "3, almost four inches". She made a significant recovery.

In 2012 Jimenez participated in the first season of Project Runway: All Stars but was eliminated in the first episode.
