= Project Runway season 4 =

Project Runway
- Season 4
- Region 1 DVD cover
- No. of tasks: 14
- No. of contestants: 15
- Winner: Christian Siriano
- No. of episodes: 14

Release
- Original network: Bravo
- Original release: November 14, 2007 – March 5, 2008

Season chronology
- ← Previous; Season 3 Next → Season 5

The fourth season of Project Runway, Bravo's reality competition for fashion designers, premiered on November 14, 2007. Returning as judges were supermodel Heidi Klum; fashion designer Michael Kors; and Nina Garcia, Elle magazine fashion director. Tim Gunn, chief creative officer at Liz Claiborne, Inc., again acts as a mentor to the contestants.

Through a series of weekly challenges, contestants were eliminated, leaving three finalists left who then went on to show their designs in the final episodes at New York Fashion Week. The winner, Christian Siriano, received prizes including: an editorial feature in Elle, $100,000 from Tresemmé to start his own line, the opportunity to sell a fashion line on Bluefly.com, and a 2008 Saturn Astra automobile. Siriano mentors the designers on Project Runway from season 17.

Elisa Jimenez, Sweet P Vaughn and Rami Kashou later appeared in Project Runway: All Stars in 2012, where Elisa placed 13th, Sweet P Placed 12th, and Rami came in 8th place out of 13. In 2014, Chris March appeared in the fourth season of All Stars, coming in 12th place out of 14.

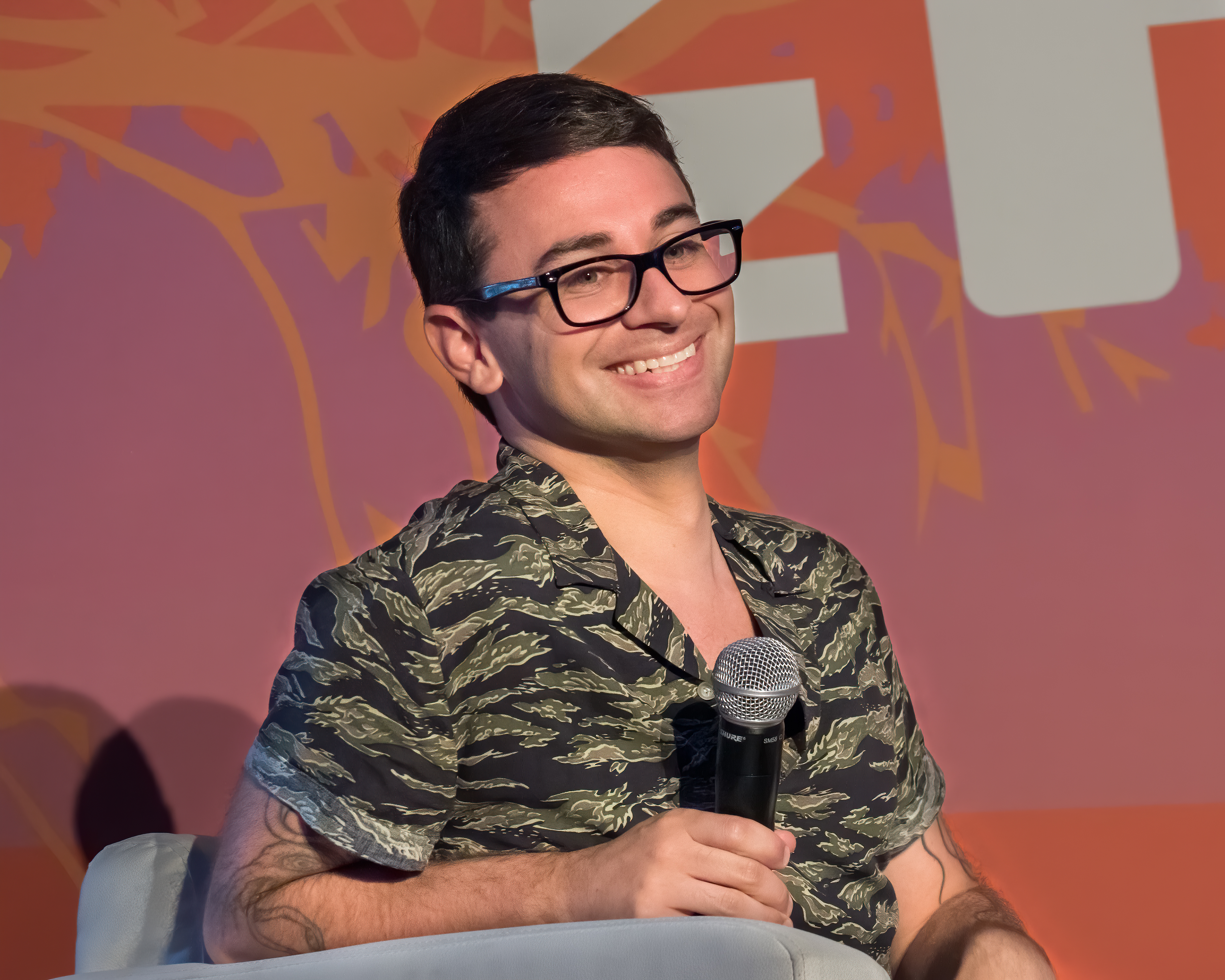
Christian Siriano, season 4 winner

== Contestants ==
Contestant	Age	Hometown	Finish	Outcome
Simone LeBlanc	32	Lawrenceville, GA	Episode 1	15th place
Marion Lee	39	Tyler, TX	Episode 2	14th place
Carmen Webber	39	Charlotte, NC	Episode 3	13th place
Jack Mackenroth	38	New York, NY	Episode 5	12th place
Steven Rosengard	30	Chicago, IL	Episode 5	11th place
Elisa Jimenez	42	El Paso, TX	Episode 6	10th place
Kevin Christiana	31	Fairfield, NJ	Episode 7	9th place
Christina "Kit Pistol" Scarbo	26	Los Angeles	Episode 8	8th place
Victorya Hong	34	Winchester, VA	Episode 9	7th place
Ricky Lizalde	35	Escondido, CA	Episode 10	6th place
Kathleen "Sweet P" Vaughn	46	Los Angeles	Episode 11	5th place
Chris March †	44	San Francisco, CA	Episode 13	4th place
Jillian Lewis	26	Selden, NY	Episode 14	3rd place
Rami Kashou	31	Ramallah, Palestine	Episode 14	Runner-up
Christian Siriano	21	Annapolis, MD	Episode 14	Winner

(ages listed are the designers' ages at the time the show was taped in the summer of 2007)

=== Models ===
Model	Age	Hometown	Outcome
Wendi Sullivan	28	Canton, MA	15th place
Cheron Smith	22	Torrance, CA	14th place
Anna Lita Perez	25	Kyiv, Ukraine	13th place
Christina Anderson-McDonald	23	Meadowbrook, PA	12th place
Ashley Evans	22	Smithville, MO	11th place
Katie Nelson	19	New York, NY	10th place
Aviva Brocks	21	London, England	9th place
Marie Salter	25	Katy, TX	8th place
Jacqueline Miranne	21	New York, NY	7th place
Amanda Alter	23	DeWitt, AR	6th place
Lea Rannells	22	Bridgewater, NJ	5th place
Marcia Mitchell	23	The Berkshires, Massachusetts	4th place
Lauren Browne	18	Grafton, MA	3rd place
Samantha "Sam" Ruggiero	19	Redding, CT	Runner-up
Lisa Nargi	25	New York, NY	Winner

== Challenges ==
Designer Elimination Progress
Designers	1	2	3	4^{1}	5^{2}	6	7^{3}	8	9	10	11	13^{5}	14	Eliminated Episode
Christian	HIGH	LOW	IN	IN	WIN	IN	LOW	WIN	HIGH	HIGH	WIN	ADV	WINNER	14 – Finale, Part 2
Rami	WIN	IN	IN	HIGH	IN	WIN	LOW^{6}	LOW	HIGH	LOW	LOW	ADV	RUNNER-UP	14 – Finale, Part 2
Jillian	IN	IN	IN	WIN	HIGH	HIGH	IN	HIGH	LOW	HIGH	HIGH	ADV	3RD PLACE	14 – Finale, Part 2
Chris	IN	IN	IN	OUT	LOW	HIGH	IN	HIGH	LOW	WIN	LOW	OUT		4 – Trendsetter / 13 – Finale, Part 1
Sweet P	IN	HIGH	LOW	IN	IN	LOW	HIGH	LOW^{4}	HIGH	LOW	OUT			11 – The Art of Fashion
Ricky	LOW	IN	LOW	LOW	IN	IN	LOW	LOW	WIN	OUT				10 – Raw Talent
Victorya	HIGH	WIN	IN	LOW	IN	LOW	WIN	HIGH	OUT					9 – Even Designers Get The Blues
Kit	IN	IN	HIGH	IN	IN	IN	IN	OUT						8 – En Garde!
Kevin	IN	HIGH	HIGH	HIGH	HIGH	IN	OUT							7 – What a Girl Wants
Elisa	LOW	HIGH	IN	LOW	LOW	OUT								6 – Eye Candy
Steven	IN	LOW	IN	LOW	OUT									5 – What's the Skinny?
Jack	IN	IN	WIN	IN	WD									5 – What's the Skinny?
Carmen	IN	LOW	OUT											3 - Fashion Giant
Marion	IN	OUT												2 – I Started Crying
Simone	OUT													1 – Sew Us What You Got

The designer won Project Runway season 4.
The designer advanced to Fashion Week.
The designer won the challenge.
The designer came in second but did not win the challenge.
The designer had one of the highest scores for that challenge, but did not win.
The designer had one of the lowest scores for that challenge, but was not eliminated.
The designer was in the bottom two, but was not eliminated.
The designer lost and was out of the competition.
The designer withdrew from the competition.

^Note 1: Even though their groups had scored lowest, outfits made by Elisa, Victorya, and Sweet P were liked by the judges.
^Note 2: Jack left the competition for medical reasons. Chris, who was previously eliminated in Episode 4, returned to take his place.
^Note 3: Christian originally was one of the higher scores for this challenge, but landed in the bottom two due to communication issues with his client.
^Note 4: Sweet P's design was considered good even though her group received a low score.
^Note 5: The judges declared a tie between Rami and Chris, and asked each to design a collection for Bryant Park; one of the two would be chosen to show at Bryant Park Fashion Week based on his three strongest pieces
^ Note 6: Although Rami had one of the lowest scores for the challenge, he was automatically safe as he had immunity.

Model Elimination Progress
	1	2	3	4	5	6	7	8	9	10	11	12	13 ^{1}	14
Lisa	CS	CS	CS	CS	CS	RL	RL	CS	CS	CS	CS	CS	CS	WINNER
Samantha	SR	SR	SR	SR	SR	RK	RK	RK	RK	RK	RK	RK	RK	OUT
Lauren	SL	JL	JL	JL	JL	JL	JL	JL	JL	JL	JL	JL	JL	OUT
Marcia	CM	CM	CM	CM	CM	CM	CM	CM	CM	CM	CM	CM	CM	OUT
Lea	EJ	RL	RL	JM	–	CS	CS	SP	SP	SP	SP	–	OUT	
Amanda	JL	KC	KC	KC	KC	KC	KC	RL	RL	RL	OUT			
Jacqueline	VH	VH	VH	VH	VH	VH	VH	VH	VH	OUT				
Marie	KP	KP	KP	KP	KP	KP	KP	KP	OUT					
Aviva	JM	EJ	EJ	EJ	EJ	EJ	–	OUT						
Katie	KC	SP	SP	SP	SP	SP	SP	OUT						
Ashley	RK	RK	RK	RK	RK	OUT								
Christina	SP	JM	JM	RL	RL	OUT								
Anna Lita	CW	CW	CW	OUT										
Cheron	ML	ML	–	OUT										
Wendi	RL	OUT												

The model won Project Runway Season 4.
The model wore the winning design that challenge.
The model wore the losing design that challenge.
The model was eliminated.

Designer legend

- Carmen Webber: CW
- Chris March: CM
- Christian Siriano: CS
- Elisa Jimenez: EJ
- Jack Mackenroth: JM
- Jillian Lewis: JL
- Kevin Christiana: KC
- Kit Pistol: KP
- Marion Lee: ML
- Rami Kashou: RK
- Ricky Lizalde: RL
- Simone LeBlanc: SL
- Steven Rosengard: SR
- Sweet P: SP
- Victorya Hong: VH

^Note 1: Cheron, Anna Lita, Marie, and Jacqueline were used in this challenge to show off the designers' strongest pieces of their collection. However, they will not be in contention for the finale win.

== Episodes ==
=== Episode 1: Sew Us What You Got ===
The designers arrive in New York and are asked to create a garment that best reflects who they are as a designer. They are given 10 minutes to grab from $50,000 worth of fabric in three tents set up in Bryant Park. The designers are randomly assigned models.

- Judges: Heidi Klum, Nina Garcia, Michael Kors
- Guest Judge: Monique Lhuillier
- WINNER: Rami
- OUT: Simone
- First aired November 14, 2007

=== Episode 2: I Started Crying / Money Changes Everything ===
The remaining designers are asked to create a two-piece garment for Sarah Jessica Parker's BITTEN line using $15 of materials and only one day to complete their look. All fourteen designers pitched their designs to Parker, who chose seven to work in teams of two to create the design. The winning design was sold beginning in November 2007 at Steve & Barry's stores.

Team Leader	Other Team Member
Ricky	Jack
Christian	Carmen
Rami	Jillian
Elisa	Sweet P
Kit	Chris
Victorya	Kevin
Marion	Steven

- Judges: Heidi Klum, Nina Garcia, Michael Kors
- Guest Judge: Sarah Jessica Parker
- WINNER: Victorya (teamed with Kevin Christiana)
- OUT: Marion (teamed with Steven Rosengard)
- First aired November 21, 2007

=== Episode 3: Fashion Giant ===
The remaining designers are asked to create a three piece menswear outfit for guest judge Tiki Barber to wear on The Today Show. The designers are randomly assigned male models.

- Judges: Heidi Klum, Nina Garcia, Michael Kors
- Guest Judge: Tiki Barber
- WINNER: Jack
- OUT: Carmen
- First aired November 28, 2007

=== Episode 4: Trendsetter ===
Each designer picks one of 12 outdated fashion trends. Then working in four teams of three, each team must incorporate all three styles into a cohesive collection of three outfits. They have $225 and two days for the project.

Team Leader	Team Members	The Outdated Fashion Trends
Jillian	Kevin, Rami	Overalls, 1970s Flare, Poodle Skirt
Chris	Sweet P, Steven	Shoulder Pads, Baggy Sweater, Dancewear
Christian	Jack, Kit	Zoot Suit, Pleather, Fringe
Ricky	Elisa, Victorya	Neon, Cut-Outs, Underwear As Outerwear

- Note 1: Although Victorya, Elisa and Sweet P's overall group performance was LOW, their garments were considered good by the judges.
- Note 2: Following the runway presentation, the judges announced that because they all unanimously loved Jillian's look, she was immediately named the winner.
- Judges: Heidi Klum, Nina Garcia, Michael Kors
- Guest Judge: Donna Karan
- WINNER: Jillian (teamed with Rami and Kevin)
- OUT: Chris (teamed with Steven and Sweet P)
- First aired December 5, 2007

=== Episode 5: What's the Skinny? ===
Each designer has to create an outfit for a woman who has recently lost weight, using one of the woman's outfits from before her weight loss as raw material for the new design. The new outfit must incorporate aspects of the now-thin woman's personality, as well as the designer's own style. Each designer is given $10 to use for additional materials. They have one day to complete the outfits.

Designers and Clients:

- Steve with Laura
- Chris with Silvia
- Jillian with Erika
- Kevin with Elyse
- Sweet P with Chris
- Victorya with Ory
- Elisa with Tracy
- Ricky with Penny
- Kit with Alicia
- Christian with Kerry
- Rami with Lisa
- Judges: Heidi Klum, Nina Garcia, Michael Kors
- Guest Judge: Patrick Robinson, head designer for The Gap
- WINNER: Christian
- LEFT: Jack left to receive medical treatment for a MRSA infection. To keep the same level of competition, he was replaced with Chris, the last designer eliminated.
- OUT: Steven
- First aired December 12, 2007

=== Episode 6: Eye Candy ===
Designers are to create a garment using any materials that were available at the Hershey's store in Times Square, New York City. They are given no budget but only five minutes to collect materials, and are given only one day to complete the outfit.

- Judges: Heidi Klum, Nina Garcia, Michael Kors
- Guest Judge: Zac Posen
- WINNER: Rami
- OUT: Elisa
- First aired January 2, 2008

=== Episode 7: What a Girl Wants ===
Designers are challenged to design a prom dress for a group of 16- and 17-year-old girls from St. John Vianney High School in New Jersey. The girls, along with their mothers, pre-select the designers they want to work with based on the designers' portfolios. The designers have a budget of $250 for materials from Mood and two days to construct the dresses. The winner is dependent on who did the best according to the clients, and they are judged on time management.

- Judges: Heidi Klum, Nina Garcia, Michael Kors
- Guest Judge: Gilles Mendel
- WINNER: Victorya
- OUT: Kevin
- First aired January 9, 2008

=== Episode 8: En Garde! ===
Each designer is randomly paired with another designer and asked to select a team leader. Each team is asked to create an avant-garde outfit based on inspiration from their models' hair styles. They are given a budget of $300 and two days to create this look. The following day, each team is asked to create another, simpler, ready-to-wear outfit which embodies the "essence" of the avant-garde look they have been working on. For the second piece, the designers have a budget of $50. The leader of the winning team receives immunity in the next challenge, while the winning team and their outfits are featured in a TRESemme fashion shoot.

Teams:

- **Kit** and Ricky (LOW)
- **Rami** and Sweet P (LOW)
- **Christian** and Chris (**WIN**)
- **Victorya** and Jillian (HIGH)

- Note: Team leaders in bold.
- Note 2: Although Sweet P's overall group performance was LOW, her garment was considered good by the judges.
- Judges: Heidi Klum, Nina Garcia, Michael Kors
- Guest Judge: Alberta Ferretti
- WINNER: Christian (teamed with Chris March)
- OUT: Kit (teamed with Ricky Lizalde)
- First aired January 16, 2008

=== Episode 9: Even Designers Get the Blues ===
The designers are tasked with creating an iconic look using deconstructed denim fabric and white cotton while also showing off the Levi's 501 legacy. The designers are given three minutes to collect provided denim jeans and jackets and cotton fabric hanging from clotheslines in a storeroom; Notions such as buttons, rivets, and other fasteners are provided in the workroom. The designers have one day to complete the design. From this challenge forward, the winning designer would no longer gain immunity in the following challenge.

- Judges: Heidi Klum, Nina Garcia, Michael Kors
- Guest Judge: Caroline Calvin
- WINNER: Ricky
- OUT: Victorya
- First aired January 23, 2008

=== Episode 10: Raw Talent ===
Each designer selects one of six WWE Divas based on their general attitude, and must design an outfit that matches that attitude and can be worn in the wrestling ring. The designers are given $100 for fabric and two days to complete the designs.

- Judges: Heidi Klum, Nina Garcia, Michael Kors
- Guest Judges: Traver Rains and Richie Rich
- Guest Clients: Maria Kanellis, Kristal Marshall, Michelle McCool, Candice Michelle, Layla El, Torrie Wilson.
- WINNER: Chris (Made Maria's outfit that will be worn during a WWE match)
- OUT: Ricky
- First aired February 6, 2008

=== Episode 11: The Art of Fashion ===
The designers are given 45 minutes in three galleries (the Greek and Roman Sculpture courtyard, the European Painting wing, and the Temple of Dendur) at the Metropolitan Museum of Art to select a piece of art to use as inspiration for a dress, using provided cameras to capture the artwork. They are given $300 for materials at Mood, and two days to complete the design.

Designers and their art inspiration:

- **Chris** – Marie Francoise
- **Christian** – Don Andrés de Andrade y la Cal
- **Jillian** – The Story of the Argonauts
- **Rami** – Aphrodite
- **Sweet P** – Peacocks

- Judges: Heidi Klum, Nina Garcia, Michael Kors
- Guest Judges: Roberto Cavalli
- WINNER: Christian
- OUT: Sweet P
- First aired February 13, 2008
- All the designers who remain in the competition at the end of this episode will show collections at Bryant Park at New York Fashion Week in February 2008.
- While statements throughout the show stated that only three designers would move on, the judges declared Rami and Chris tied, and thus, both will develop their line for the Bryant Park show. However, prior to the show, both will display their three best pieces to the judges, who will then decide who will actually be participating for the Project Runway competition during Bryant Park, reducing the final judging decision to three.
- While they say that only the one that wins the tie will move on, since Fashion Week was before the airing of this episode, Sweet P actually developed a line for the event, and sold at least one garment.

=== Episode 12: Reunion ===
All the designers gather for a reunion. Christian Siriano is given $10,000 as the winner of the viewer "Fan Favorite" contest by Season 3's Mychael Knight. Highlights of the season are reviewed, including different designers' reactions to being eliminated, the judges' unaired reactions to the Raw Talent episode, as well as the remaining designers' wrestling diva alter-egos; personality traits of the designers such as Chris March's laugh, Ricky Lizalde's crying, Elisa Jimenez's offbeat personality, and Christian's repeated use of the word "fierce".

- Hosts Heidi Klum, Tim Gunn
- Guest Judges: None
- Guests: Mychael Knight, Nina Garcia, Michael Kors
- FAN FAVORITE: Christian
- OUT: None
- First aired February 20, 2008

=== Episode 13: Finale (Part 1) ===
The four remaining designers are given five months and $8000 to create a collection of twelve looks for Fashion Week. Three and a half months later, Tim visits each of the designers to assess their progress. The designers return to New York City after five months. Chris and Rami are to select their three best outfits from their collections, and are given three hours to fit pre-selected models and prepare their hair and makeup before the runway show; they each can use the help of one of the other competitors (Jillian with Rami, Christian with Chris). The winner of this runway show, Rami, joins the other two, Jillian and Christian, in the competition at the Bryant Park show.

- Guest Judges: none
- ADVANCED: Rami
- OUT: Chris
- First aired February 27, 2008
- Chris and Sweet-P showed decoy collections at Fashion Week, as their elimination episodes had not yet aired.

=== Episode 14: Finale (Part 2) ===
- Judges: Heidi Klum, Nina Garcia, Michael Kors
- Guest Judges: Victoria Beckham
- WINNER of Project Runway Season 4: Christian Siriano
- OUT: Jillian Lewis (second runner-up), Rami Kashou (first runner-up)
- First aired March 5, 2008
- PR4 Model Winner: Lisa Pryston Nargi, who got a spread in Elle magazine, wearing Siriano's designs.

== Reception ==
In 2011, Vicky Hyman of The Star-Ledger understood judges' rationale for crowning "wunderkind Christian Siriano" but found Rami Kashou's "red-carpet-red collection" more breathtaking.
