= Project Runway season 10 =

Project Runway
- Season 10
- No. of tasks: 12
- No. of contestants: 16
- Winner: Dmitry Sholokhov
- No. of episodes: 14

Release
- Original network: Lifetime
- Original release: July 19 – October 18, 2012

Season chronology
- ← Previous; Season 9 Next → Season 11

Project Runway Season 10 is the tenth season of the television show Project Runway, appearing on Lifetime. The season began airing on July 19, 2012 with 16 designers competing to become "the next great American designer."

The series began filming on June 15, 2012, launching the season with a fashion show in front of a live audience.

Returning as judges were supermodel Heidi Klum; fashion designer Michael Kors; and Marie Claire fashion director Nina Garcia. Tim Gunn returned as the workroom mentor. This would be the final season that Michael Kors would be a full-time judge, as he later decided he wanted to spend more of his time as a fashion designer as opposed to judging Project Runway.

Lord & Taylor was the exclusive retail sponsor for Project Runway's 10th season and merchandised the accessory wall with an assortment of products. In addition, Lord & Taylor hosted a challenge episode for the designers and for consumers on Fashion's Night Out at its flagship store on Fifth Avenue in New York City.

Melissa Fleis, Christopher Palu and Elena Slivnyak competed in Project Runway All Stars (season 3) in 2013. Melissa placed 9th, Christopher placed 4th, and Elena placed 3rd.

In 2014, Gunnar Deatherage, Fabio Costa, Sonjia Williams and Dmitry Sholokhov appeared in Project Runway All Stars (season 4). Gunnar placed 9th, Fabio placed 5th, Sonjia was the runner-up, and Dmitry won the competition.

In 2018, Melissa Fleis and Fabio Costa both once again returned to compete in Project Runway All Stars (season 6). Melissa placed 13th while Fabio was the runner-up.

In 2019, Dmitry Sholokhov returned for a third time to compete in Project Runway All Stars (season 7) alongside worldwide Project Runway winners. He was the runner-up of the season.

In 2023, Fabio Costa returned to compete in Project Runway (season 20) placing 9th out of 14.

== Contestants ==
Contestant	Age	Hometown	Finish	Outcome
Beatrice Guapo	29	Orange County, California	Episode 1	16th place
Lantie Foster	48	Sacramento, California	Episode 2	15th place
Andrea Katz	58	Oceanside, New York	Episode 4	14th place
Kooan Kosuke†	30	Himeji, Hyōgo, Japan	Episode 4	13th place
Buffi Jashanmal	32	Dubai, United Arab Emirates	Episode 4	12th place
Raul Osorio	27	Canoga Park, California	Episode 5	11th place
Nathan Paul	33	Zanesville, Ohio	Episode 6	10th place
Alicia Hardesty	27	Brandenburg, Kentucky	Episode 8	9th place
Gunnar Deatherage	22	Hanover, Indiana	Episode 9	8th place
Ven Budhu	28	Berbice, Guyana	Episode 10	7th place
Elena Slivnyak	28	Kyiv, Ukraine	Episode 11	6th place
Sonjia Williams	27	Boston, Massachusetts	Episode 12	5th place
Christopher Palu	24	Brooklyn, New York	Episode 14	4th place
Melissa Fleis	31	Rogers City, Michigan	Episode 14	3rd place
Fabio Costa	29	Belo Horizonte, Brazil	Episode 14	Runner-up
Dmitry Sholokhov	32	Navapolatsk, Belarus	Episode 14	Winner

=== Models ===
- Katt Vogel
- Hannah Herreid
- Lacee Teel
- Claudia Ruff
- Alexandra Wynne
- Mayra Rosario
- Kate Wilson
- Lauren Way
- Kailah Lindsey
- Sashalee Pallagi
- Jordan Hathaway
- Sarah Goolden
- Ashley Sanee'
- Phoenix Skye
- Aubrey Wilder
- Sonika Shankar

=== Extra Models-Challenge 1 ===
- Alex Spencer
- Anna Zhylyak
- Brandie Bowman
- Elaina Williams
- Iman Payne
- Jasmine Rivers
- Kyler Tate
- Priscilla Ebonae
- Sandra Woodley

== Challenges ==
Designer Elimination Table
Designers	1	2	3	4	5^{1}	6	7^{2}	8^{3}	9	10	11^{4}	12	13	14	Eliminated Episode
Dmitry	IN	IN	IN	HIGH	IN	HIGH	IN	LOW	WIN	HIGH	HIGH	WIN	ADV	WINNER	14 – Finale, Part 2
Fabio	IN	IN	HIGH	LOW	HIGH	WIN	HIGH	LOW	IN	IN	HIGH	LOW	ADV	RUNNER-UP	14 – Finale, Part 2
Melissa	HIGH	IN	IN	IN	WIN	IN	HIGH	LOW	HIGH	HIGH	LOW	HIGH	ADV	3RD PLACE	14 – Finale, Part 2
Christopher	WIN	IN	LOW	HIGH	HIGH	IN	WIN	HIGH	LOW	WIN	WIN	HIGH	ADV	4TH PLACE	14 – Finale, Part 2
Sonjia	IN	HIGH	IN	WIN	IN	LOW	IN	WIN	HIGH	LOW	WIN	OUT			12- In a Place Far, Far Away
Elena	IN	LOW	IN	IN	LOW	IN	HIGH	LOW	IN	LOW	OUT				11 – It's Fashion Baby
Ven	HIGH	WIN	WIN	IN	IN	LOW	IN	LOW	LOW	OUT					10 – I Get a Kick Out of Fashion
Gunnar	IN	HIGH	HIGH	IN	LOW	HIGH	LOW	HIGH	OUT						9 – It's All About Me
Alicia	IN	IN	LOW	IN	IN	IN	LOW	OUT							8 – Starving Artist
Nathan	IN	IN	IN	IN	IN	OUT									6 – Fix My Friend
Raul	IN	IN	OUT	LOW	OUT										5 – It's My Way On the Runway
Buffi	IN	LOW	IN	OUT											4 – Women On the Go
Kooan	LOW	IN	HIGH	WD											4 – Women On the Go
Andrea	IN	IN	LOW	WD											4 – Women On the Go
Lantie	LOW	OUT													2 – Candy Couture
Beatrice	OUT														1 – A Times Square Anniversary Party

The designer won Project Runway Season 10.
The designer was advanced to Fashion Week.
The designer won the challenge.
The designer came in second but did not win the challenge.
The designer had one of the highest scores for that challenge, but did not win.
The designer had one of the lowest scores for that challenge, but was not eliminated.
The designer was in the bottom two, but was not eliminated.
The designer lost and was out of the competition.
The designer withdrew from the competition.

^1: In episode 5, the 11 remaining designers were split into 2 teams: A team of 5 (Christopher, Fabio, Gunnar, Nathan, and Ven) and a team of 6 (Alicia, Dimitry, Elena, Melissa, Raul, and Sonjia) . The judges determined that the scores for both teams were equal and that there was no winning or losing team. Each individual was eligible for the win. Melissa won the challenge and although many of the designers received positive feedback, Christopher, Fabio, and Melissa were singled out by the judges as the TOP 3. Elena, Gunnar, and Raul received criticism and their scores are noted as being lower, as the Official Website Scorecard indicates them as the Bottom 3.
^2: In episode 7, no one was eliminated and since they were still down one designer from where they planned to be at this point they only eliminated one designer the following week.
^3: The team consisting of Melissa, Fabio, and Ven were placed on the bottom. However, although the judges primarily had many problems and criticisms regarding their looks, the pieces that Melissa made were noted as being very strong, and she received positive feedback.
^4:There were two winners selected during this episode. Three designers designed an outfit for a baby boy, the other three designed for a baby girl. Christopher won the girl's outfit challenge and Sonjia won the boy's.

Model Elimination Table
Model	1	2	3^{1}	4	5	6^{1}	7	8	9	10	11^{1}	12	13	14
Katt	DS	DS	–	DS	DS	–	DS	DS	DS	DS	–	DS	DS	WIN (DS)
Hannah	FC	FC	–	FC	FC	–	FC	FC,VB	FC	FC	–	FC	FC	FC
Lacee	MF	MF	–	MF	MF	–	MF	MF,VB	MF	MF	–	MF	MF	MF
Claudia	CP	CP	–	CP	CP	–	CP	CP,GD	CP	CP	–	CP	CP	CP
Alexandra	SW	SW	–	SW	SW	–	SW	SW,GD	SW	SW	–	SW	OUT	
Mayra	ES	ES	–	ES	ES	–	ES	–	ES	ES	–	OUT		
Kate	BJ	BJ	–	BJ	VB	–	VB	–	VB	VB	–	OUT		
Lauren	GD	GD	–	GD	GD	–	GD	–	GD	OUT				
Kailah	AH	AH	–	AH	AH	–	AH	ES,AH	OUT					
Sashalee	NP	NP	–	NP	NP	–	OUT							
Jordan	RO	RO	–	–	RO	–	OUT							
Sarah	VB	VB	–	VB	OUT									
Ashley	AK	AK	–	RO	OUT									
Phoenix	KK	KK	–	OUT										
Sonika	LF	LF	–	OUT										
Aubrey	BG	OUT												

The model wore the winning designs of Project Runway Season 10.
The model wore the winning design that challenge.
The model wore the losing design that challenge.
The model was eliminated.

Designer legend

- Alicia Hardesty: AH
- Andrea Katz: AK
- Beatrice Guapo BG
- Buffi Jashanmal: BJ
- Christopher Palu: CP
- Dmitry Sholokhov: DS
- Elena Slivnyak: ES
- Fabio Costa: FC
- Gunnar Deatherage: GD
- Kooan Kosuke: KK
- Lantie Foster: LF
- Melissa Fleis: MF
- Nathan Paul: NP
- Raul Osorio: RO
- Sonjia Williams: SW
- Ven Budhu: VB

== Episodes ==
=== Episode 1: A Times Square Anniversary Party ===
Original Airdate: July 19, 2012

- Sixteen contestants arrive in New York with an outfit they designed at home that represents who they are as a designer. They are then given one day and $100 to create a complementary outfit. Both outfits were shown in the first runway show, held outdoors in Times Square.
- Judges: Heidi Klum, Nina Garcia, Michael Kors
- Guest Judges: Patricia Field and Lauren Graham
- WINNER: Christopher
- ELIMINATED: Beatrice

=== Episode 2: Candy Couture ===
Original Airdate: July 26, 2012

- In the Project Runway traditional "unconventional challenge," designers have to make outfits using candy from Dylan's Candy Bar.
- Judges: Heidi Klum, Nina Garcia, Michael Kors
- Guest Judge: Dylan Lauren
- WINNER: Ven
- ELIMINATED: Lantie

=== Episode 3: Welcome Back (or Not) to the Runway ===
Original Airdate: August 2, 2012

- Given the keys to 2013 Lexus GS 350 cars by Tim Gunn, designers were paired up and tasked to create an outfit based on their car's color. Each pair designed their dresses for a client who was a notable designer from a past season. The winner of the challenge was given the privilege of attending the Emmy Awards with their winning design worn by their client.

Designer Pairs	Client	Season, Finish Position
Elena/Buffi	Laura Bennett	3, 3rd place
Christopher/Andrea	Anya Ayoung-Chee	9, Winner
Raul/Alicia	Mila Hermanovski	7, 3rd place
Gunnar/Kooan	Irina Shabayeva	6, Winner
Ven/Fabio	Kenley Collins	5, 3rd place
Dmitry/Melissa	April Johnston	8, 5th place
Nathan/Sonjia	Valerie Mayen	8, 7th place

- Judges: Heidi Klum, Nina Garcia, Michael Kors
- Guest Judge: Krysten Ritter
- WINNER: Ven
- ELIMINATED: Raul

This episode ends in a cliffhanger, as Buffi and Melissa awaken the next morning to discover that Andrea's bed is empty and she is gone.

=== Episode 4: Women on the Go ===
Original Airdate: August 9, 2012

- This challenge was a Michael Kors challenge. They are to make an outfit for a woman who is always on the go. Andrea left in the middle of the night and Kooan decides to leave the competition during the day as a result of crumbling under the pressure.
- 'Judges: Heidi Klum, Nina Garcia, Michael Kors
- Guest Judges: Hayden Panettiere and Rachel Roy
- WINNER: Sonjia
- RETURNED: Raul (Note: After Andrea and Kooan made the decision to withdraw from the competition, producers decided to reinstate Raul so that they would not have fewer competitors than they were supposed to have.)
- ELIMINATED: Buffi
- WITHDREW: Andrea, (Note: Andrea left in the middle of the night unseen, and when producers attempted to contact her, she did not answer. After several hours, she finally e-mailed the producers to tell them that she was safe, but she was officially withdrawing from the competition.) Kooan (Note: After Andrea made the decision to withdraw from the competition, Kooan decided that he was not made for the show either and he should leave. He was then escorted off the premises by producers.)

=== Episode 5: It's My Way On the Runway ===
Original Airdate: August 16, 2012

- The designers were split up into two teams to create a cohesive line of professional womenswear. The designers had until 11 P.M. to finish their looks and no time the next day because of a photoshoot.

Teams	Designers
Team 6	Sonjia, Elena, Melissa, Dmitry, Alicia, Raul
Team 5	Nathan, Ven, Christopher, Fabio, Gunnar

- Note: This challenge had no winning and losing team, and any designer had the chance to be the winner.
- Judges: Heidi Klum, Nina Garcia, Michael Kors
- Guest Judge: Joanna Coles
- WINNER: Melissa
- ELIMINATED: Raul

=== Episode 6: Fix My Friend ===
Original Airdate: August 23, 2012

- The designers were given clients that are in need of a style makeover and design outfits according to their client's preferences. Tensions ran high between Ven, his client, and his fellow peers.
- Judges: Heidi Klum, Nina Garcia, Michael Kors
- Guest Judge: Alice Temperley
- WINNER: Fabio
- ELIMINATED: Nathan

=== Episode 7: Oh My Lord & Taylor ===
Original Airdate: August 30, 2012

- Lord & Taylor launched an exclusive Project Runway capsule collection to celebrate the show's tenth season. Consisting of ten cocktail and evening dresses from throughout the program's history, this collection was to be completed by the winner of this episode's challenge. The winner's dress was produced together with the other nine dresses for sale at Lord & Taylor.
- Judges: Heidi Klum, Nina Garcia, Michael Kors
- Guest Judge: Bonnie Brooks
- WINNER: Christopher
- ELIMINATED: None (Note: Judges decided that every contestant had met the bar on this challenge, and therefore nobody deserved to be eliminated.)

=== Episode 8: Starving Artist ===
Original Airdate: September 6, 2012

- In a sales-based test, the designers were split into teams of three and were tasked to sell makeshift goods to people on the street and raise funds to buy fabric. Each team then had to design two looks, one of which had to be outerwear.

Teams	Budget
Christopher, Sonjia, Gunnar	$684
Dmitry, Elena, Alicia	$500
Ven, Melissa, Fabio	$800.48

- Judges: Heidi Klum, Nina Garcia, Michael Kors
- Guest Judge: Anna Sui
- WINNER: Sonjia
- ELIMINATED: Alicia

=== Episode 9: It's All About Me ===
Original Airdate: September 13, 2012

- The contestants designed their own prints inspired by their cultural heritage that had to be featured in a modern look.
- Judges: Heidi Klum, Nina Garcia, Michael Kors
- Guest Judges: Mondo Guerra and Anya Ayoung Chee
- WINNER: Dmitry
- ELIMINATED: Gunnar

=== Episode 10: I Get a Kick Out of Fashion ===
Original Airdate: September 20, 2012

- The designers had to design an outfit for the Rockettes. Christopher's winning design featuring the New York skyline will be worn in a future Rockettes performance.
- Judges: Heidi Klum, Nina Garcia, Michael Kors
- Guest Judge: Debra Messing
- WINNER: Christopher
- ELIMINATED: Ven

=== Episode 11: It's Fashion Baby ===
Original Airdate: September 27, 2012

- The designers were tasked to create looks for Heidi Klum's 'Babies R Us' collection while caring for a lifelike baby doll. They also had to create a companion outfit for the moms. There were two winners: Christopher won the best design for the girl outfits, while Sonjia won for the boy outfits.
- Judges: Heidi Klum, Nina Garcia, Michael Kors
- Guest Judge: Hilary Duff
- WINNER: Christopher and Sonjia
- ELIMINATED: Elena

=== Episode 12: In a Place Far, Far Away ===
Original Airdate: October 4, 2012

- The designers are to create avant-garde looks inspired by the new L'Oreal Paris makeup line.

Designer	Makeup Line
Dmitry	Wise Mystic
Melissa	Artsy Muse
Christopher	Enchanted Queen
Fabio	Enchanted Queen
Sonjia	Seductive Temptress

- Judges: Heidi Klum, Nina Garcia, Michael Kors
- Guest Judge: Zoe Saldaña
- WINNER: Dmitry
- ELIMINATED: Sonjia

=== Episode 13: Finale, Part I ===
Original Airdate: October 11, 2012

- Advanced to Fashion Week: Christopher, Dmitry, Fabio, Melissa
- Judges: Heidi Klum, Nina Garcia, Michael Kors

=== Episode 14: Finale, Part II ===
Original Airdate: October 18, 2012

- Judges: Heidi Klum, Nina Garcia, Michael Kors
- Guest Judge: Jennifer Hudson
- WINNER: Dmitry
- ELIMINATED: Fabio, Melissa, Christopher
