= Chris March =

American fashion and costume designer (1963–2019)

- Born: February 25, 1963; Alameda, California, U.S.
- Died: September 5, 2019 (aged 56); Stockton, California, U.S.
- Occupations: Fashion and costume designer

Christopher Andrew March (February 25, 1963 – September 5, 2019) was an American fashion and costume designer, best known for his appearance as a contestant on season 4 (2007–2008) of Bravo's Project Runway. While Chris was initially eliminated in episode 4, he came back the next episode to replace a contestant who had to leave due to medical reasons. Chris ended up placing 4th, getting eliminated right before fashion week.

He was also on season 4 (2014–2015) of Project Runway All Stars. Additionally, he competed in the one-shot special Project Runway: All-Star Challenge (2009), and was the third runner-up.

== Career ==
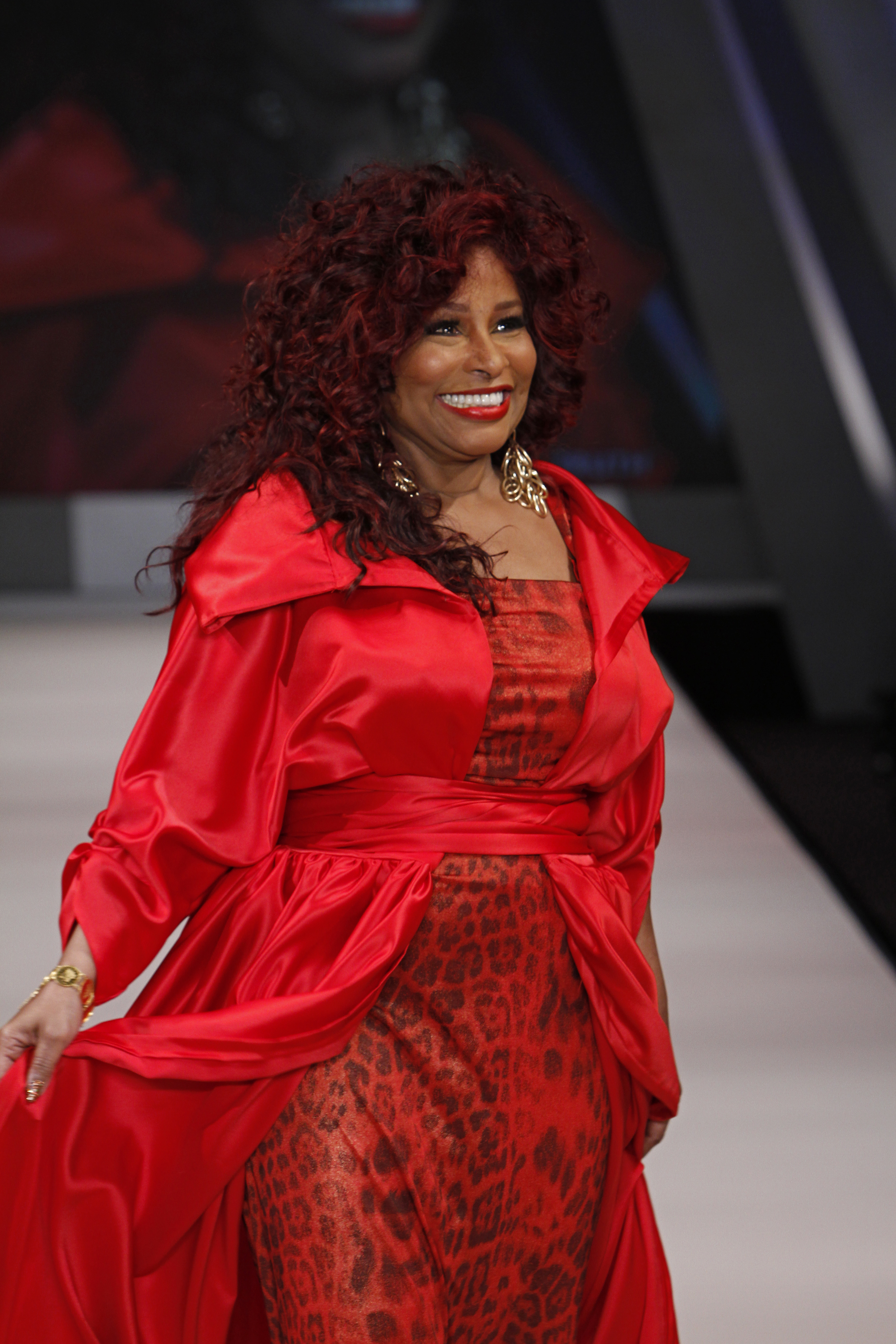
Chaka Khan wearing a Chris March dress

Born on February 25, 1963, March was originally from Alameda, California, where he worked as a costume designer for the long-running musical revue, Beach Blanket Babylon. During the fourth season finale of Project Runway, March, who had become popular with avant-garde creations, gained notoriety when he showcased human hair on his designs. In the end, however, he was eliminated from showcasing at Bryant Park during New York Fashion Week. His client list included Madonna, Cirque du Soleil, Prince, Beyoncé Knowles (he constructed the costumes for her I Am... Tour), Lady Gaga, Thierry Mugler and Meryl Streep. His costuming efforts were recognized with a Drama Desk Award nomination in 2002 for Christmas With the Crawfords.

March resided in New York City and appeared on several episodes of The Real Housewives of New York City as a friend of Sonja Morgan.

March starred on a show about his work as a costume designer, entitled Mad Fashion, which premiered on the Bravo Network on October 4, 2011. Mad Fashion ran for ten episodes.

== Accident and death ==
In June 2017, March fell in his apartment and hit his head. After lying unconscious for four days, he awoke and was able to call 911 and was rushed to the hospital, where he was kept in a medically induced coma for the next two months. Upon awakening, March discovered that he'd lost functionality in both legs as well as his right hand and arm.

He returned to California with hopes of recovering, and was admitted to a long-term care facility in Stockton, where he continued designing until his death.

On September 5, 2019, March died of a heart attack.

== See also ==
- List of fashion designers
