= Anne Fulenwider =

American journalist (born 1972)

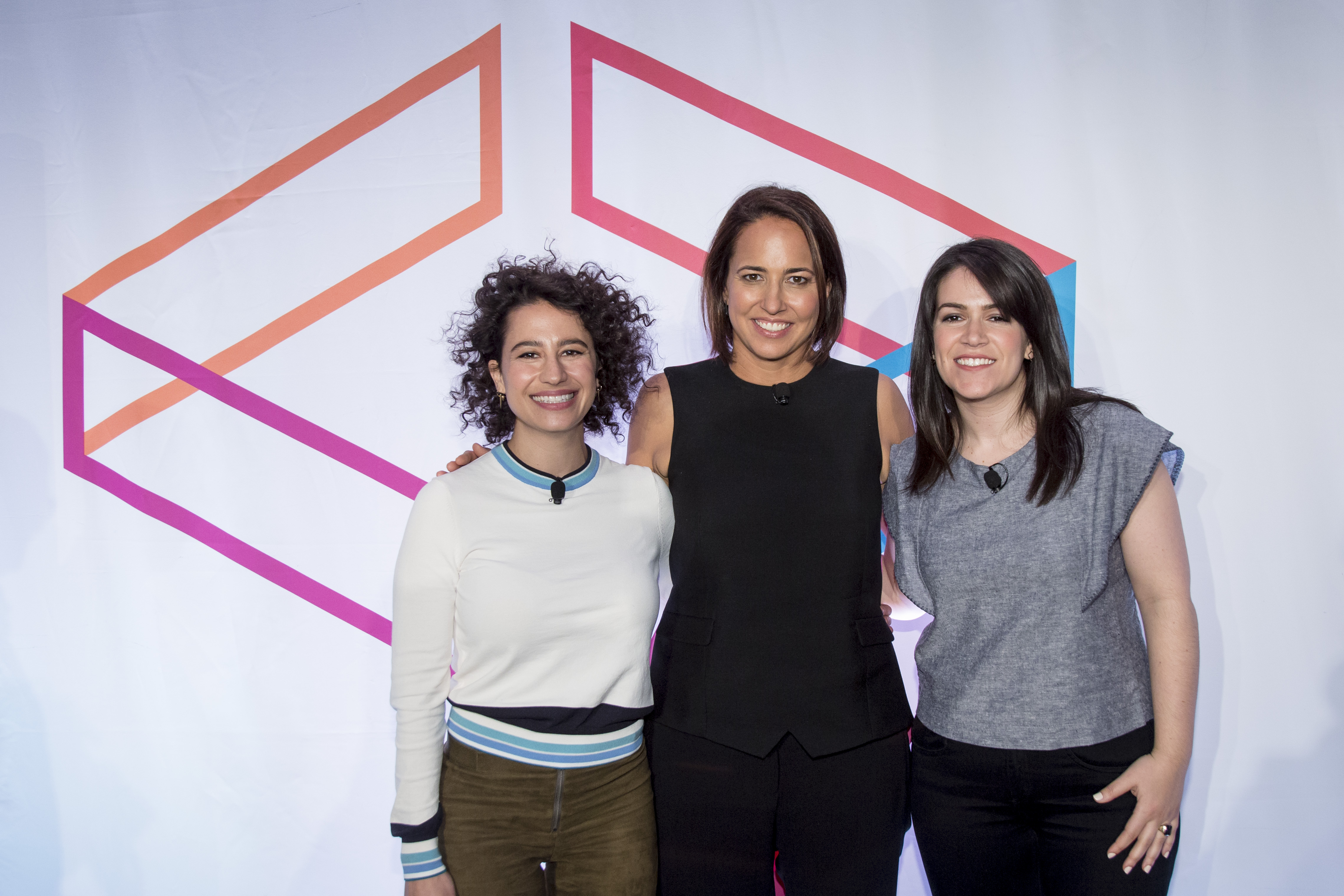
- Anne Fulenwider, 2015
- Born: March 30, 1972 (age 54); New York City, U.S.
- Occupation: Former editor-in-chief of Marie Claire magazine

Anne Fulenwider (born March 30, 1972) was the editor-in-chief of Marie Claire magazine. She was the editor-in-chief from 2012 to 2020. Prior to that she was the editor-in-chief for Brides. At Marie Claire, Fulenwider was responsible for introducing the Image Makers Awards (awards to honor Hollywood artists), Fresh Faces (a spotlight feature), and The Power Trip (a women's conference bringing together powerful women from both the west and east coasts of the US).

Fulenwider appears frequently as a judge on the Emmy-winning TV show Project Runway and as a mentor on Project Runway All Stars. She is an advisor to numerous councils such as the New York State Council on Women.

== Early life and career ==
Fulenwider became interested in editing when she served as the editor of her high school newspaper. She studied English and American Literature at Harvard University. She wrote a few articles for The Harvard Crimson, but ended up at the literary magazine there. After graduating magna cum laude with a B.A. in English and American Literature from Harvard in 1995, Fulenwider began an internship at David Lauren's startup Swing magazine, a magazine aimed at people in their 20s, which launched her career in journalism.

Fulenwider worked as an assistant for George Plimpton at The Paris Review, and aided him as a researcher for his biography on Truman Capote. As a senior editor for Vanity Fair she edited best-selling authors such as Dominick Dunne, Buzz Bissinger, and Fran Lebowitz. From September 2009 she was executive editor for Marie Claire under Joanna Coles, before being appointed the editor-in-chief of Brides in October 2011. At Brides Fulenwider gradually moved the focus of the magazine from strictly being about weddings to include more content about sex, travel and finance. Fulenwider resigned at Brides in May 2012 before starting her position as editor-in-chief of Marie Claire in September 2012.

== Marie Claire ==
As editor-in-chief of Marie Claire, Fulenwider oversaw all content for its print magazine, website, tablet editions and brand extensions. She was responsible for introducing initiatives such as the Fresh Faces, Image Makers Awards, The Power Trip and the magazine's first sustainability issue. The Fresh Faces is the magazine's spotlight on up-and-coming talents today, and has had its own annual party in Los Angeles since 2013. The Image Maker's Awards have been held annually in Hollywood since January 2015 and honor the makeup artists, hair and fashion stylists working in the film industry. The Power Trip is a women's conference, bringing together "100 power women from the East Coast to meet 100 power women on the West coast for a 36-hour bi-coastal celebration that begins in the sky".

On December 9, 2019, The New York Times reported that Anne Fulenwider would be leaving her post at the end of the year to build a start-up dedicated to women's health.

== Other work ==
Fulenwider appears frequently as a judge on the TV show Project Runway and as a mentor on Project Runway All Stars. She is an advisor to the UN Foundation's Girl Up, an advisor to the ANNpower Vital Voices Advisory Council since 2013, the Corporation for Public Broadcasting's ITVS Women & Girls Leadership Council since 2014, and All in Together, Women Leading Change. Since 2017 has been on the New York State Council on Women. She has spoken at numerous events, including the World Government Summit, the Student Career Conference, LIM College, and many others. She has been an interviewer for South by Southwest (SXSW), has been a host of panels at Internet Week New York, and Create and Cultivate in New York (in May 2019). She has also appeared as a guest on programmes such as NBC's Today show.

== Personal life ==
Fulenwider resides in Brooklyn, New York with her husband, who is a branding/media strategist, and their two children.

== Awards and honors ==
At Marie Claire, Fulenwider was named Media Industry Newsletter 's "Editor of the Year" in 2013; Folio: Magazine 's "Editor of the Year" in 2015; and "Women in Media Industry Leader" in 2016. With the magazine, she has earned several American Society of Magazine Editors (ASME) nominations, including General Excellence in 2017; Cover of the Year in 2018; and in 2017, she was awarded Hearst's Innovation of the Year Award for launching The Power Trip.
