= Dmitry Sholokhov =

Belarus-American fashion designer

- Дзмітрый Шолахаў
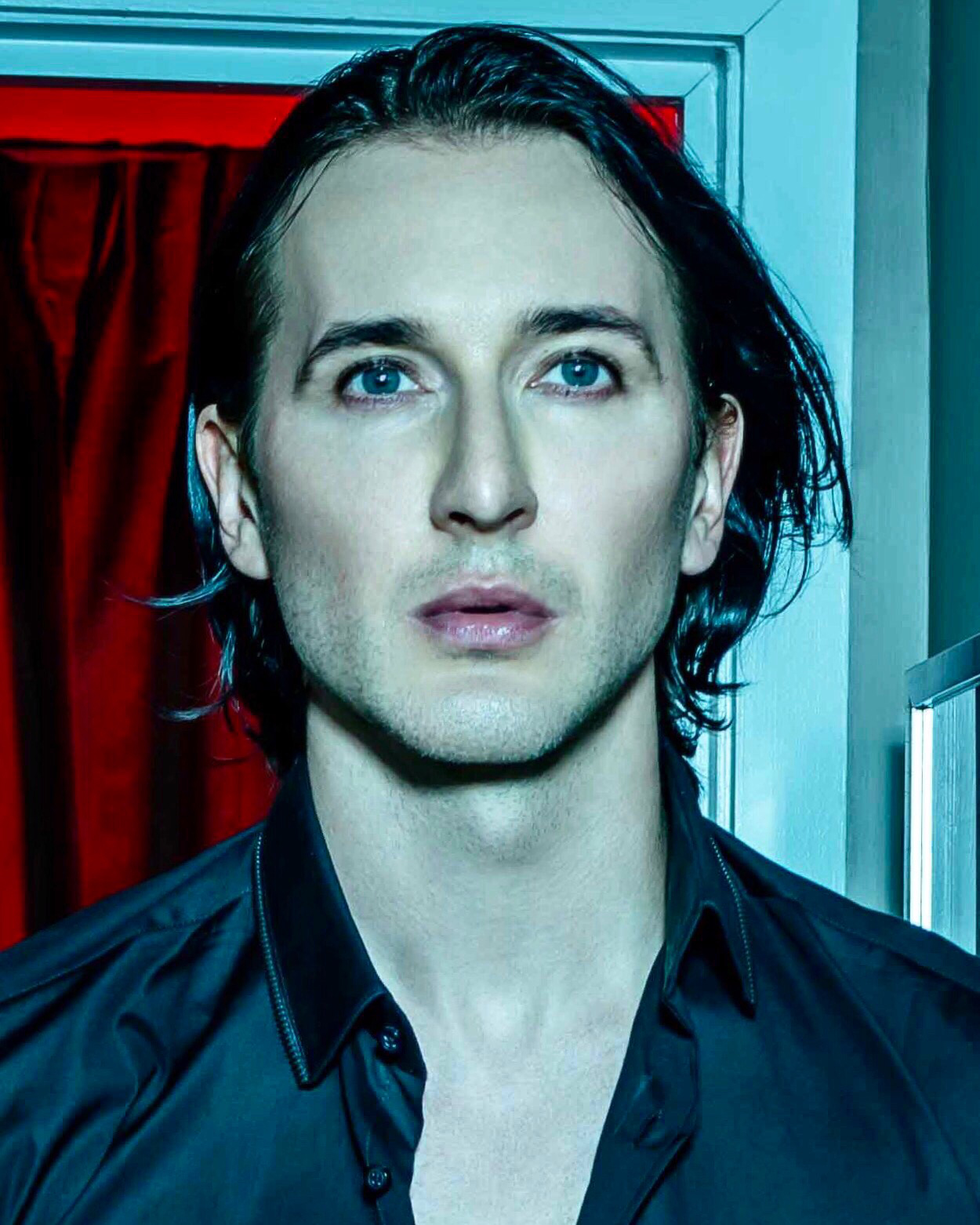
- Born: February 23, 1980 (age 46); Belarusian SSR (present-day Belarus)
- Citizenship: United States
- Education: Parsons School of Design
- Occupation: Fashion Designer
- Label: Dmitry Sholokhov
- Height: 6’1”
- Website: dmitrysholokhov.com

Dmitry Sholokhov (Note: Belarusian: Дзмітрый Шолахаў, romanized: Dzmitryy Sholakhaw, sometimes given as Dzmitry Sholakhau) (born February 23, 1980) is a Belarusian-American fashion designer, instructor, and reality television contestant, best known as the winner of season ten of Project Runway and season four of Project Runway: All Stars.

== Early life ==
Sholokhov was born in the Byelorussian Soviet Socialist Republic on February 23, 1980. His mother was a physician and his father was an architect, both of Lithuanian descent. He was a professional ballroom dancer as a teenager. He moved to New York City at the age of eighteen, and earned a Bachelor of Fine Arts (BFA) in fashion design from Parsons School of Design.

== Career ==
Sholokhov had worked for several design companies, including The Jones Group, before trying out for and winning the tenth season of Project Runway in 2012. He won the fourth season of Project Runway: All Stars in 2015.

He then worked as an instructor at Parsons School of Design. He is also a founder and a creative director of his fashion label Dmitry Sholokhov.

In 2019, Sholokhov competed in Season 7 of Project Runway All Stars, which featured a cast of previous winners from around the globe. He was the runner-up of the season.

In October 2019, Metropolitan Fashion Week awarded Sholokhov its Fashion Designer of the Year Award.

== Filmography ==
=== Television ===
Year	Title	Season	Role	Position
2012	24 Hour Catwalk	Season 1	Contestant	Winner
2012	Project Runway	Season 10	Contestant	Winner
2014–15	Project Runway All Stars	Season 4	Contestant	Winner
2019	Project Runway All Stars	Season 7	Contestant	Runner-up

== Notes ==
Preceded by Anya Ayoung-Chee	Project Runway winner Dmitry Sholokhov	Succeeded by Michelle Lesniak Franklin
