= Seth Aaron Henderson =

American designer and reality television personality

- Born: July 11, 1971 (age 55); San Diego, California, U.S.
- Occupation: Fashion designer
- Television: Project Runway Season 7 (Winner)
- Spouse: Tina

Seth Aaron Henderson (born July 11, 1971) is an American designer and reality television personality. He was the winner of the seventh season of Project Runway along with his model, Kristina Sajko.

== Project Runway ==
Seth Aaron Henderson was the first designer to become a two-time Project Runway winner, reigning supreme on the 7th season of Project Runway and also winning the 3rd season of Project Runway: All-Stars.

Most recently, he has launched his online store www.sethaaron.la and works out of his space in West Hollywood, CA where some projects include DC’s Doom Patrol Season 4 on HBO. Seth Aaron’s designs also have appeared on the red carpet, worn by celebrities such as Kylie Jenner, Alyssa Milano, Lady Gaga, Grace Jones, Nicki Minaj, Kristin Chenoweth and Katy Perry, to name a few. He has also been featured in magazines and publications such as Marie Claire, Zink, People, Entertainment Weekly, and Lucky.

Henderson also filled in for Tim Gunn as the head "casting judge" on Season 9 of Project Runway. Continuing his commitment to a sustainable future, Henderson's designs feature organic fabrics and those made from recyclable plastic bottles. His 2010 Portland Fashion Week collection was sponsored and inspired by Solar World, a manufacturer of solar panels in Oregon, Henderson's home state at the time.

Henderson's show at Portland Fashion Week in October 2011 also featured sustainable fabrics. As of 2011, he was collaborating with the New Hampshire-based Earthtec clothing company to create a sustainable line of clothing to be sold by an "as yet unnamed national retail chain".

In 2012, Henderson custom-designed a dress for philosopher Martha Nussbaum, who was being honored by Felipe VI of Spain with the Prince of Asturias Award.

In 2013, Henderson became a contestant on Project Runway: All Stars (season 3). In 2014, he was announced the winner of the season; he is the first to win both Project Runway and Project Runway: All Stars. As part of his prize package, Henderson launched a collection on QVC later that year.

In 2017, the two-time Project Runway winner collaborated with Feetz to launch the world's first 3D printed designer shoe line at FashioNXT Week.

In 2019, Henderson competed in Project Runway All Stars (season 7), that consisted of previous winners only, but he was the second designer to be eliminated.

== Personal life ==
He lives in West Hollywood, California with his wife, Tina.
