= Nina García =

Colombian American fashion journalist and reality TV judge

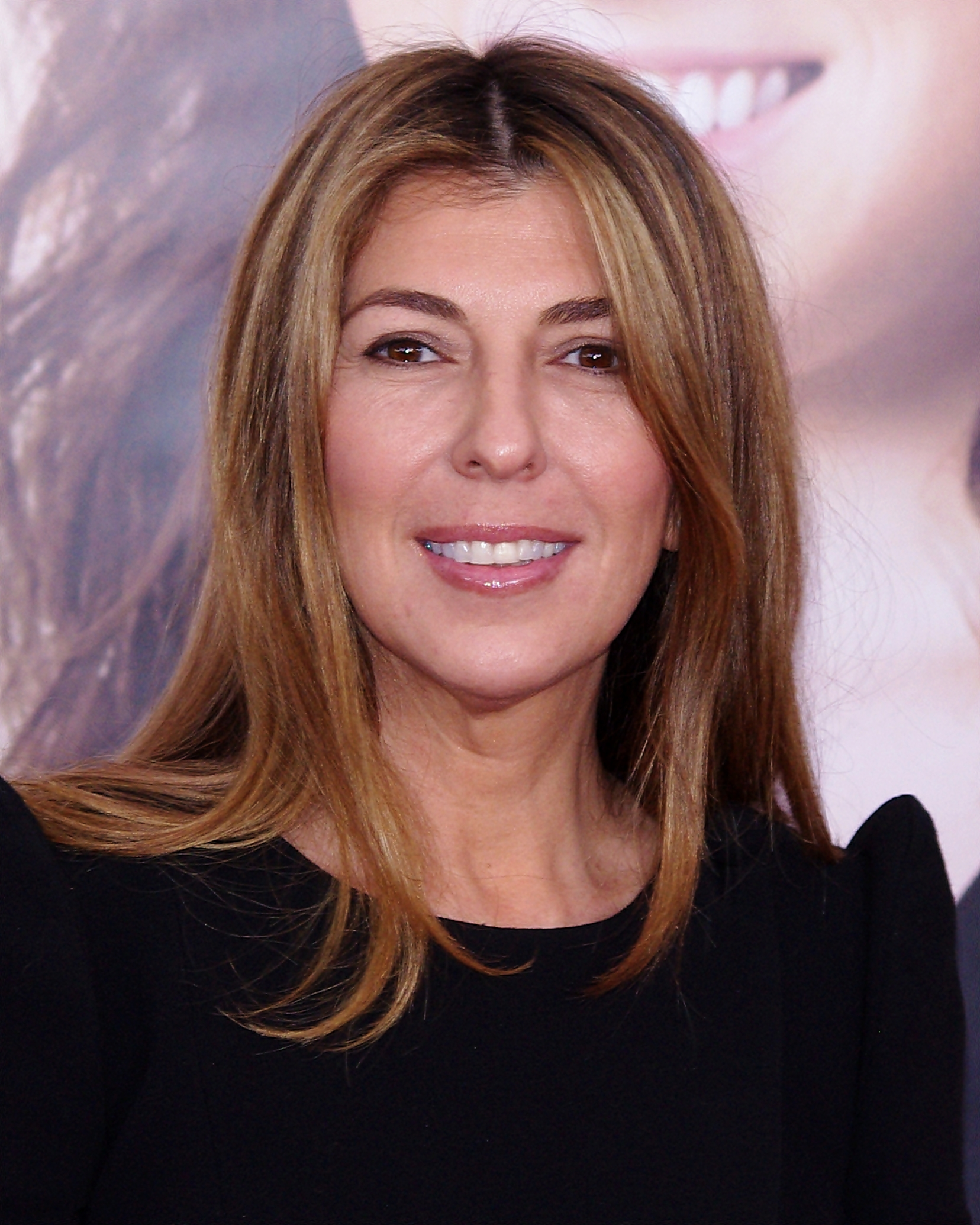
- García in 2012
- Born: Nina García; May 3, 1965 (age 61); Barranquilla, Colombia
- Education: Boston University
- Occupation: Fashion journalist
- Notable credit(s): Public relations, Perry Ellis, Marc Jacobs; Market Editor, Mirabella; Fashion Director, Elle; Fashion Director, Marie Claire
- Height: 5 ft 4 in (163 cm)
- Title: Editor-in-chief, Elle
- Spouse: David Conrod
- Children: 2

Ninotchka "Nina" García (Spanish: [niˈna ɣaɾˈsi.a]; born May 3, 1965) is a Colombian-American fashion journalist, the editor-in-chief of Elle, author, and a judge on the Bravo/Lifetime reality television program Project Runway since its first season.

== Early life and education ==
García was born in Barranquilla, Colombia, the country's fourth-most populous city on the Caribbean Sea, the daughter of a wealthy importer. She graduated from the Dana Hall School in Wellesley, Massachusetts in 1983 and holds a bachelor's degree from Boston University. Later, she attended Esmod (École Supérieure de la Mode) in Paris and earned a bachelor's degree in fashion merchandising in 1992 from the Fashion Institute of Technology (FIT).

== Career ==
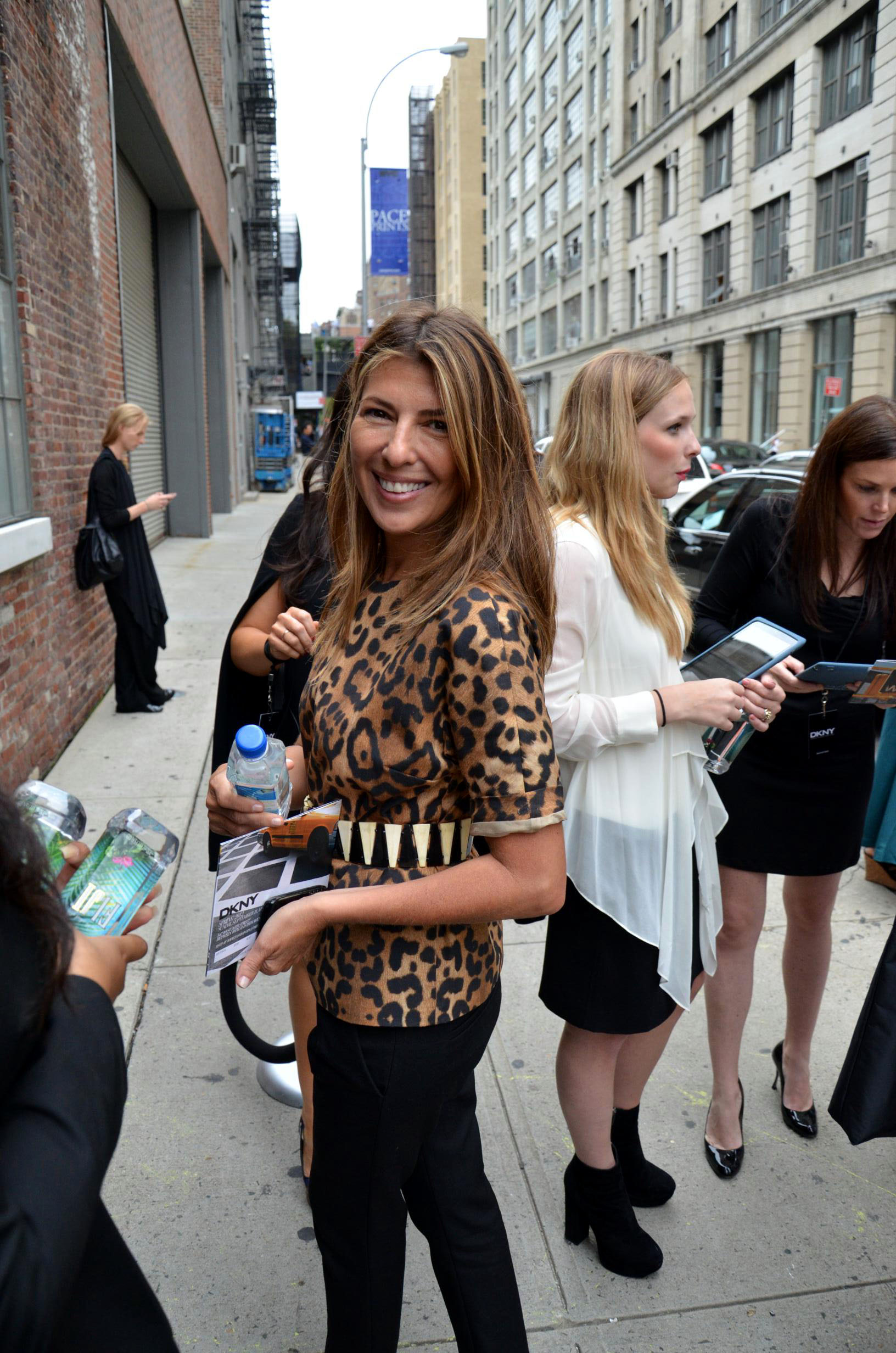
Garcia in New York in 2011

Garcia began her career in the fashion industry in the early 1980s. She worked in the public relations department for Perry Ellis and its then-designer, Marc Jacobs.

=== Journalism ===
After leaving Marc Jacobs, García moved to Mirabella, where she worked as Assistant Stylist and Market Editor until taking a position at Elle. She became Fashion Director of Elle in 2000. She left the Fashion Director position in April 2008, becoming Editor-at-Large at the magazine until the end of August. On April 11, 2008, Us Weekly reported that Garcia left her post as fashion director of Elle. Garcia's contract was reportedly up for renewal. Roberta Myers, Vice President/Editor-in-Chief at the magazine, announced May 15, 2008 that they had entered a new agreement with Nina Garcia who was named Editor-at-Large through September 1, 2008. Garcia was named the creative director of Marie Claire in 2012. Later on in her career Garcia was appointed as the editor-in-chief of Elle in September 2017, becoming the first Latina to lead a major American fashion title .

=== Other work ===
Her impact reaches beyond the fashion industry, as she takes on roles in spaces like television and mainstream media. She has hosted the red carpet for ABC's Oscar telecast, has been a judge on the Peabody Award-winning show Project Runway since it launched in 2004, and serves as a style expert on programs including Good Morning America, The View, Today, and CNN.

In May 2016, Garcia joined the advisory board of fashion tech company Nineteenth Amendment, a platform for independent fashion designers to launch collections and have their designs made on demand and sustainably in the US.

=== Author ===
García is the author of four books. On September 5, 2007, Garcia's book, The Little Black Book of Style (HarperCollins) was released. The book has been translated into Spanish and Portuguese. In August 2008, Garcia's second book for HarperCollins, The One Hundred: A Guide to the Pieces Every Stylish Woman Must Own was released. Garcia's third book, The Style Strategy was published in August 2009. Nina Garcia's Look Book was published in September 2010.

=== Awards ===
In 2010, García received an Oracle Award from Fashion Group International, and the Individual Achievement award from the Hispanic Federation. In 2015, García received the Champion of Educational Excellence Award from the Oliver Scholars Program. García also received the 2021 Media Award in Honor of Eugenia Sheppard from the Council of Fashion Designers of America for her work with ELLE. In 2022, García was honored as one of the Women of the Year by USA Today. In 2023, Nina Garcia was named by Carnegie Corporation of New York as an honoree of the Great Immigrants Awards.

== Personal life ==
Nina García is married to David Conrod, CEO of FocusPoint Private Capital Group. Together they have two children and they live in New York. In February 2019, Garcia published an article in Elle stating that she would not be attending Fashion Week that year because she was undergoing a preventative double mastectomy.
