= List of Project Runway contestants =

Project Runway is an American reality television show in which contestants compete to be the best fashion designer, as determined by the show's judges. The series first broadcast in 2004, and twenty one regular seasons and seven all-stars seasons have aired as of October 2025. The first five seasons aired on Bravo, while the succeeding seasons aired on Lifetime. Project Runway contestants are chosen by the show's producers through an application process that includes a videotape submission and "virtual portfolio" of sketches and completed designs, semi-final interviews at select cities, and a final interview.

Two hundred contestants have competed, four of whom have competed twice—Daniel Franco competed in both season 1 and season 2, Kate Pankoke in season 11 and season 12, Amanda Valentine in season 11 and season 13 and Caycee Black in season 19 and season 21. This is with the exception of all season 20 contestants, as this season used exclusively past contestants despite not being a part of the All Stars series. Angela Keslar and Vincent Libretti were originally eliminated in Episodes 8 and 9, respectively, of season 3, but were brought back due to that season's twist. Justin LeBlanc would have originally been eliminated in episode 6 of season 12, but was given a second chance due to the newly instituted "Tim Gunn Save". During season 13, the "Tim Gunn Save" was used to retroactively bring Charketa Glover back into the competition for Episode 7 after she was eliminated in Episode 6. Seven contestants left Project Runway for reasons other than being eliminated by the show's judges. Keith Michael was disqualified in season 3 for bringing design books to the contest, which is prohibited. On the other hand, Jack Mackenroth of season 4, Maya Luz of season 7, Cecilia Motwani of season 9, Andrea Katz of season 10, Kooan Kosuke of season 10, and Sandro Masmanidi of season 12 all withdrew from the show for personal reasons.

The 21 winners of the regular series are Jay McCarroll, Chloe Dao, Jeffrey Sebelia, Christian Siriano, Leanne Marshall, Irina Shabayeva, Seth Aaron Henderson, Gretchen Jones, Anya Ayoung-Chee, Dmitry Sholokhov, Michelle Lesniak, Dom Streater, Sean Kelly, Ashley Nell Tipton, Erin Robertson, Kentaro Kameyama, Sebastian Grey, Geoffrey Mac, Shantall Lacayo, Bishme Cromartie and Veejay Floresca. The 7 winners of the All-Star series are Mondo Guerra, Anthony Ryan Auld, Seth Aaron Henderson, Dmitry Sholokhov, Dom Streater, Anthony Williams and Michelle Lesniak.

== Regular Series contestants ==
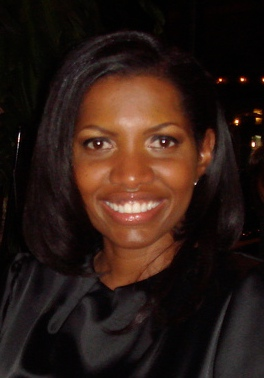
Kara Saun of season 1

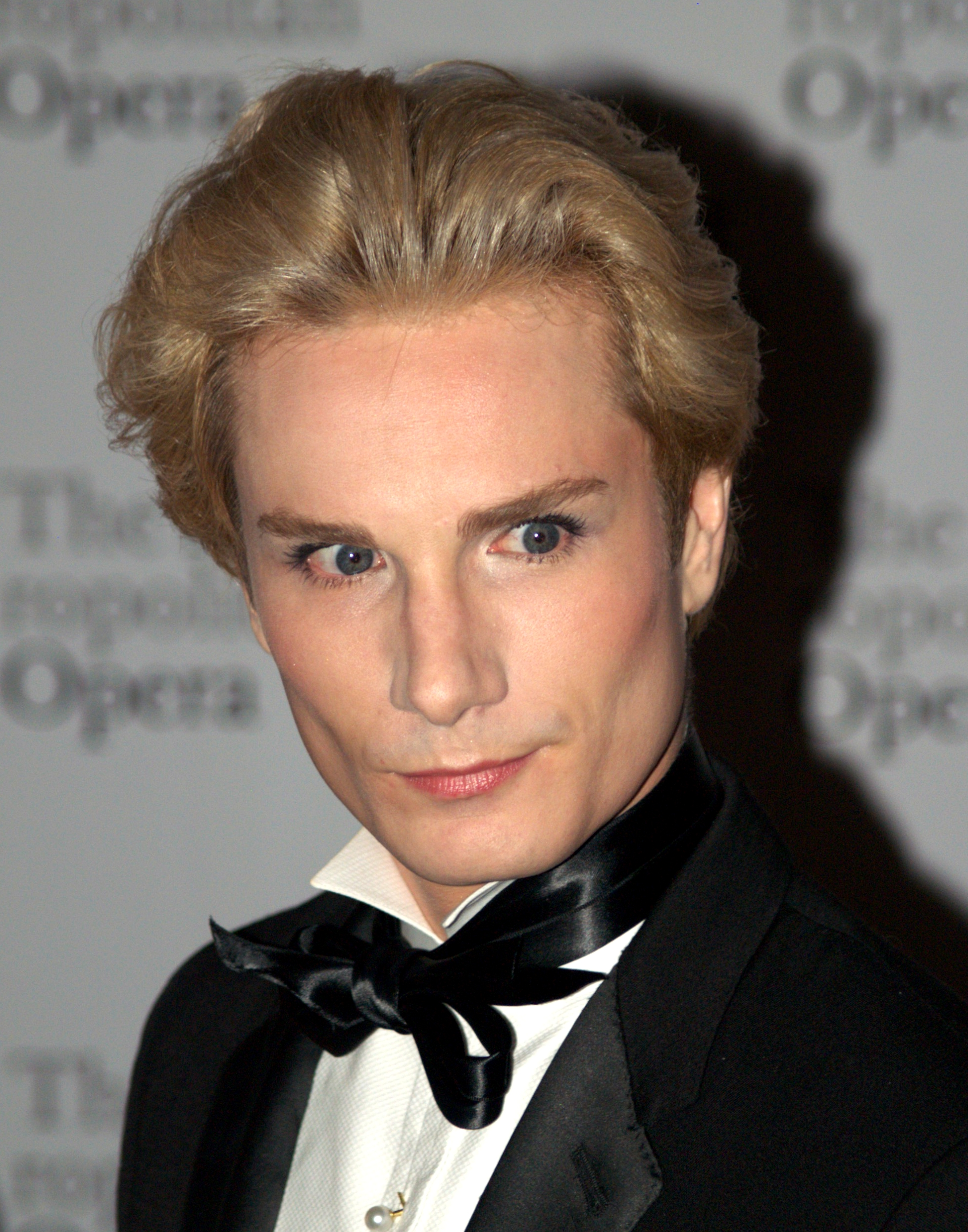
Austin Scarlett of season 1

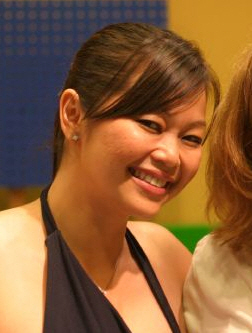
Chloe Dao, winner of season 2

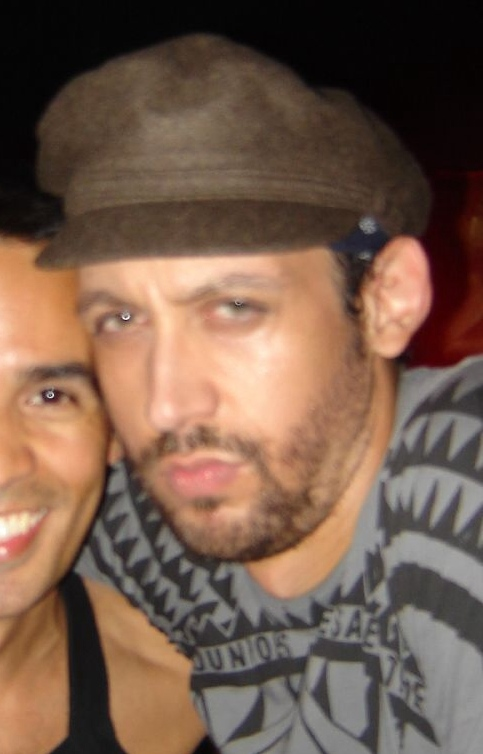
Santino Rice of season 2

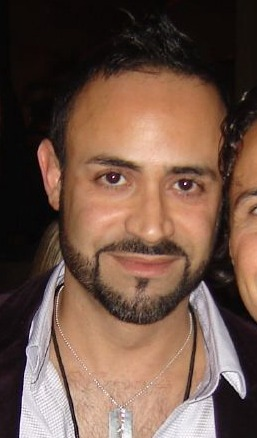
Nick Verreos of season 2

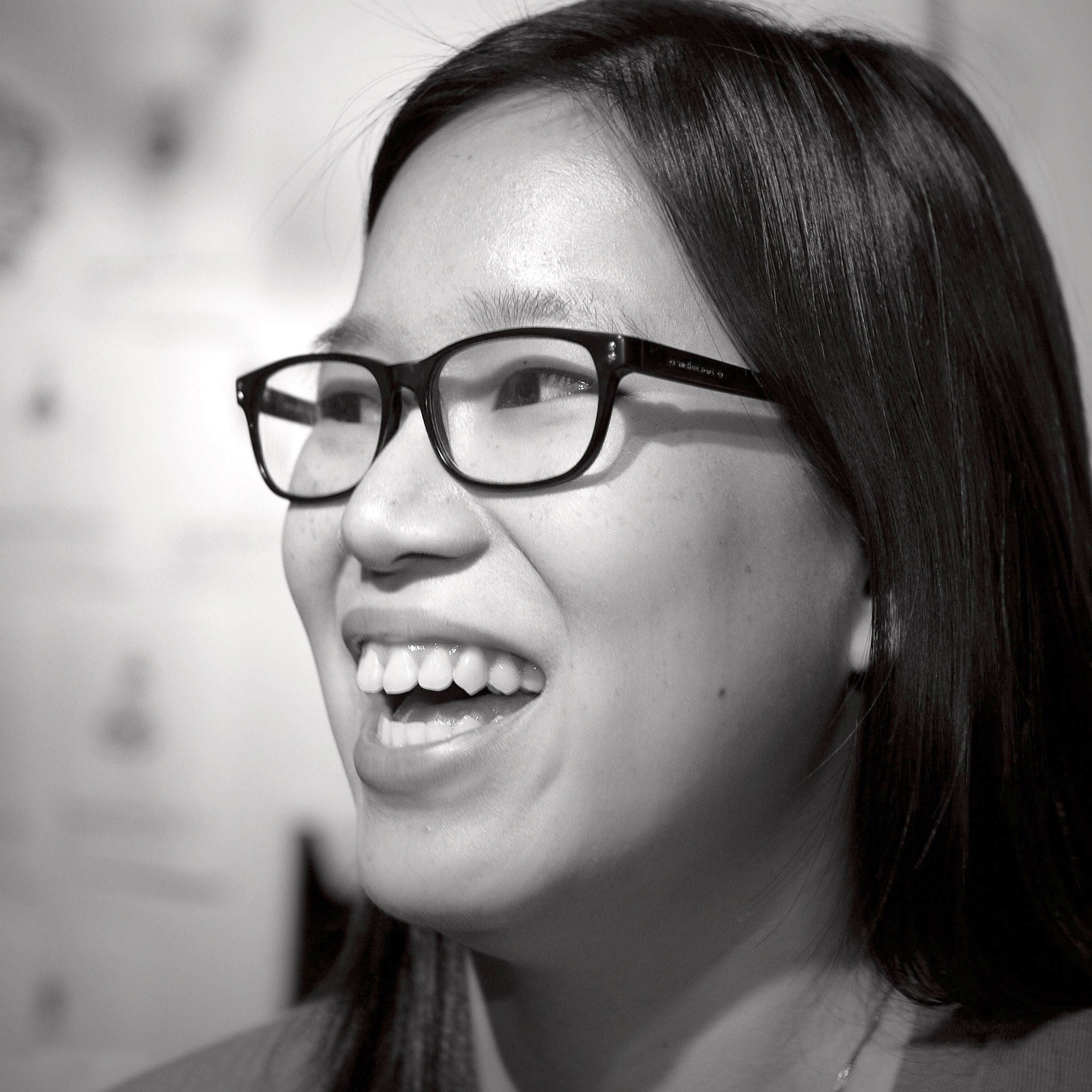
Diana Eng of season 2

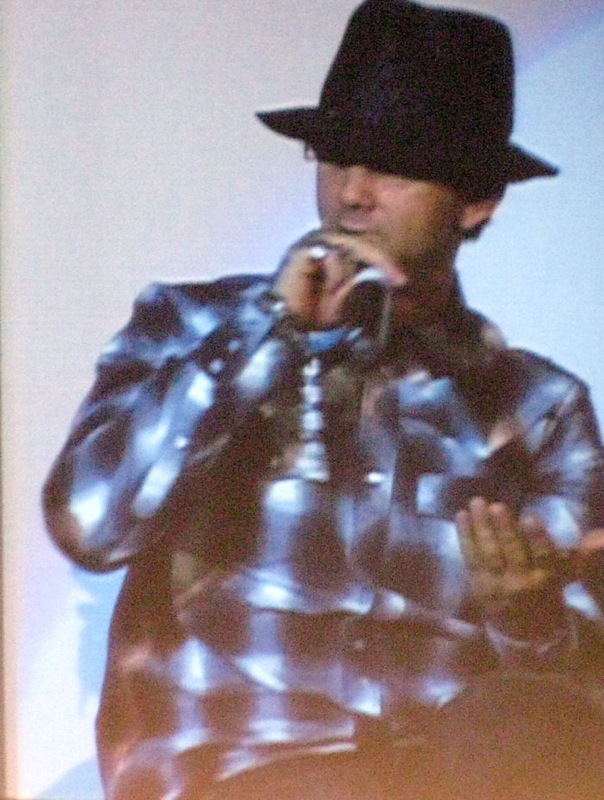
Jeffrey Sebelia, winner of season 3

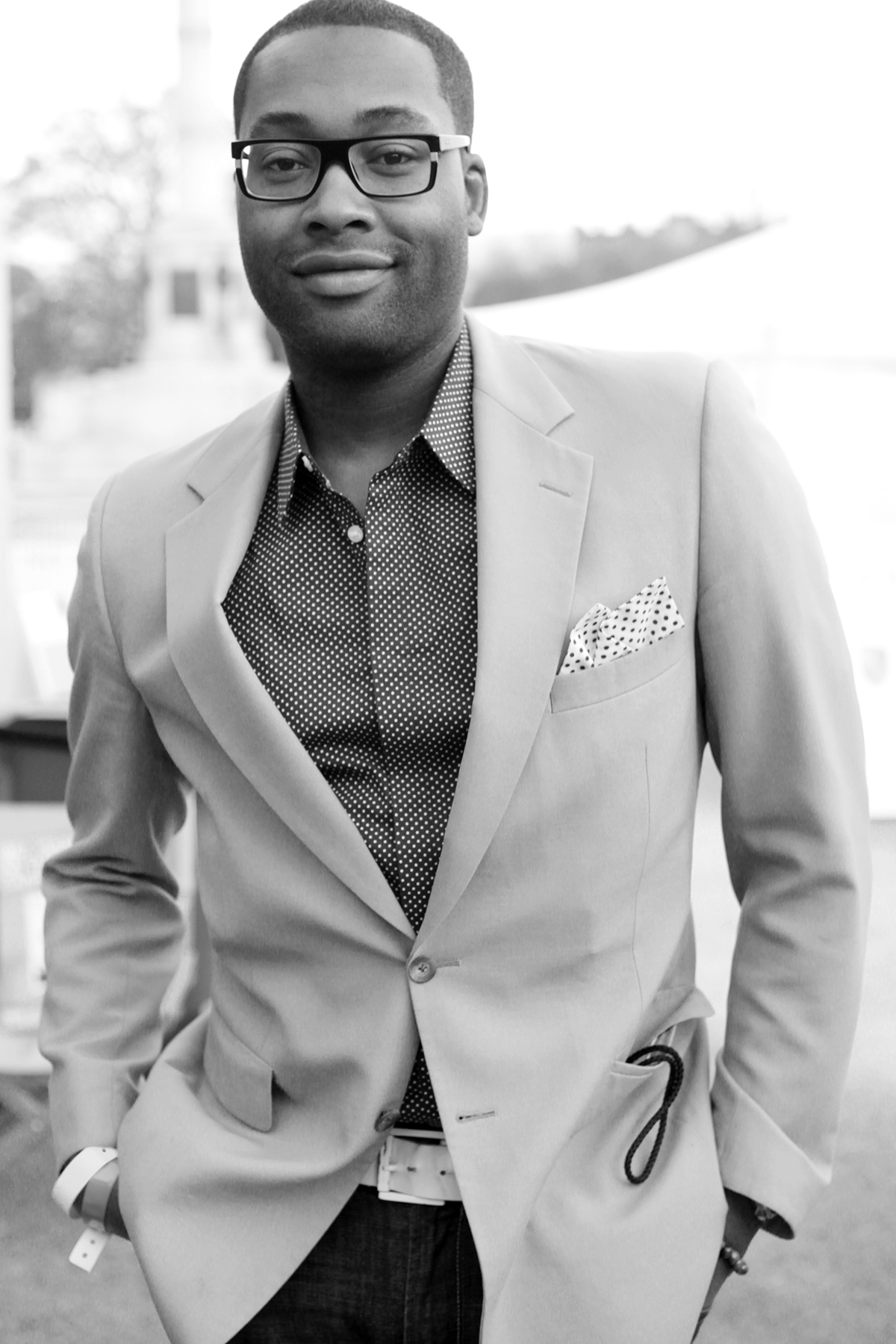
Mychael Knight of season 3

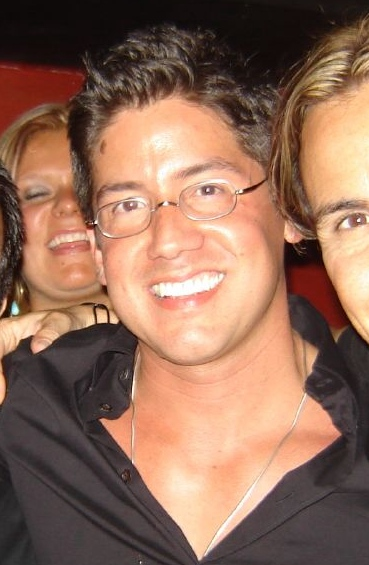
Robert Best of season 3

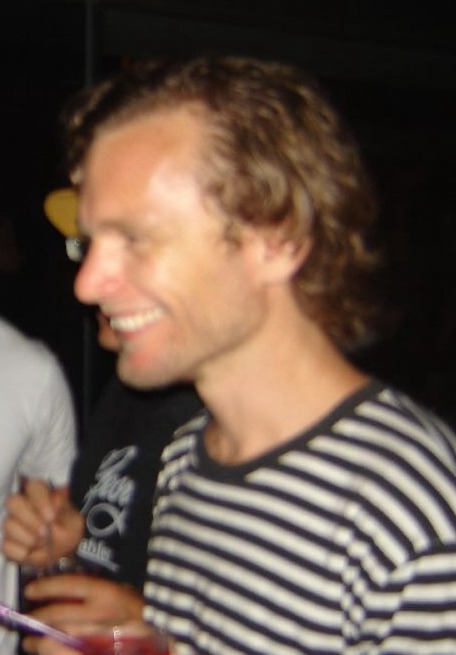
Bradley Baumkirchner of season 3

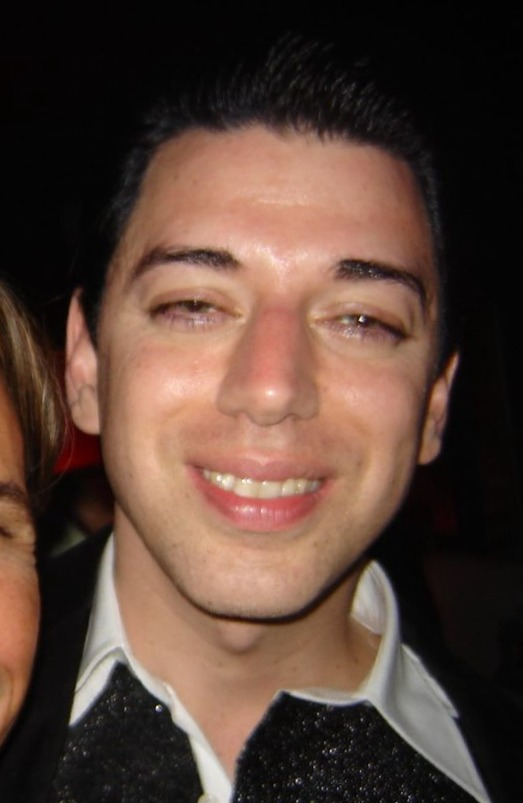
Malan Breton of season 3

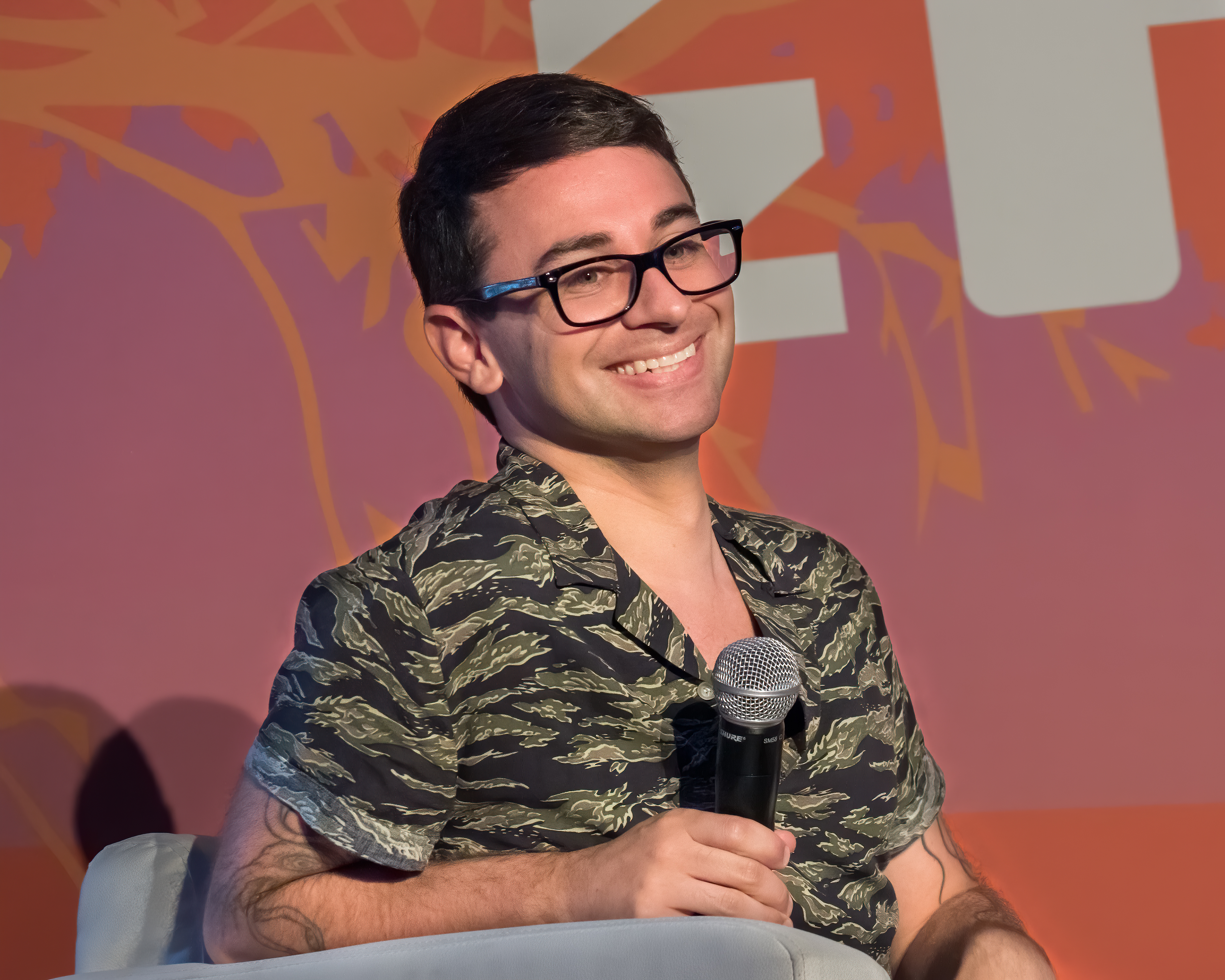
Christian Siriano, winner of season 4

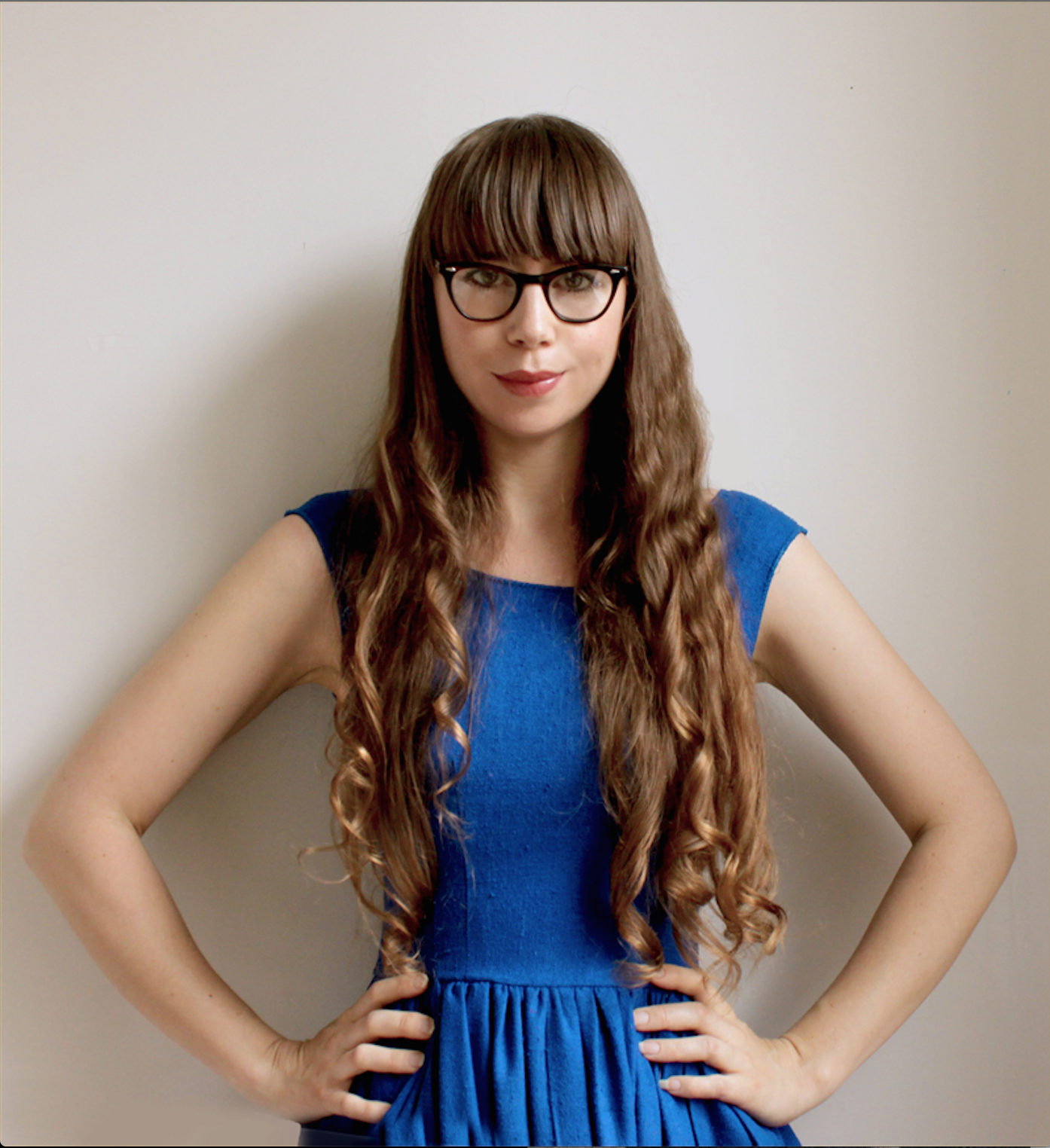
Leanne Marshall, winner of season 5

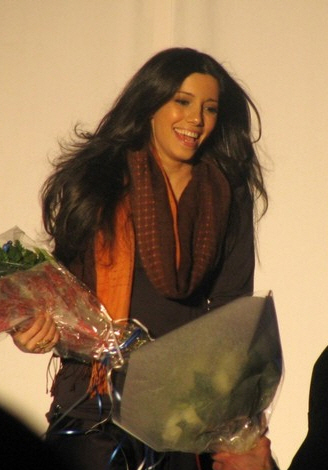
Irina Shabayeva, winner of season 6

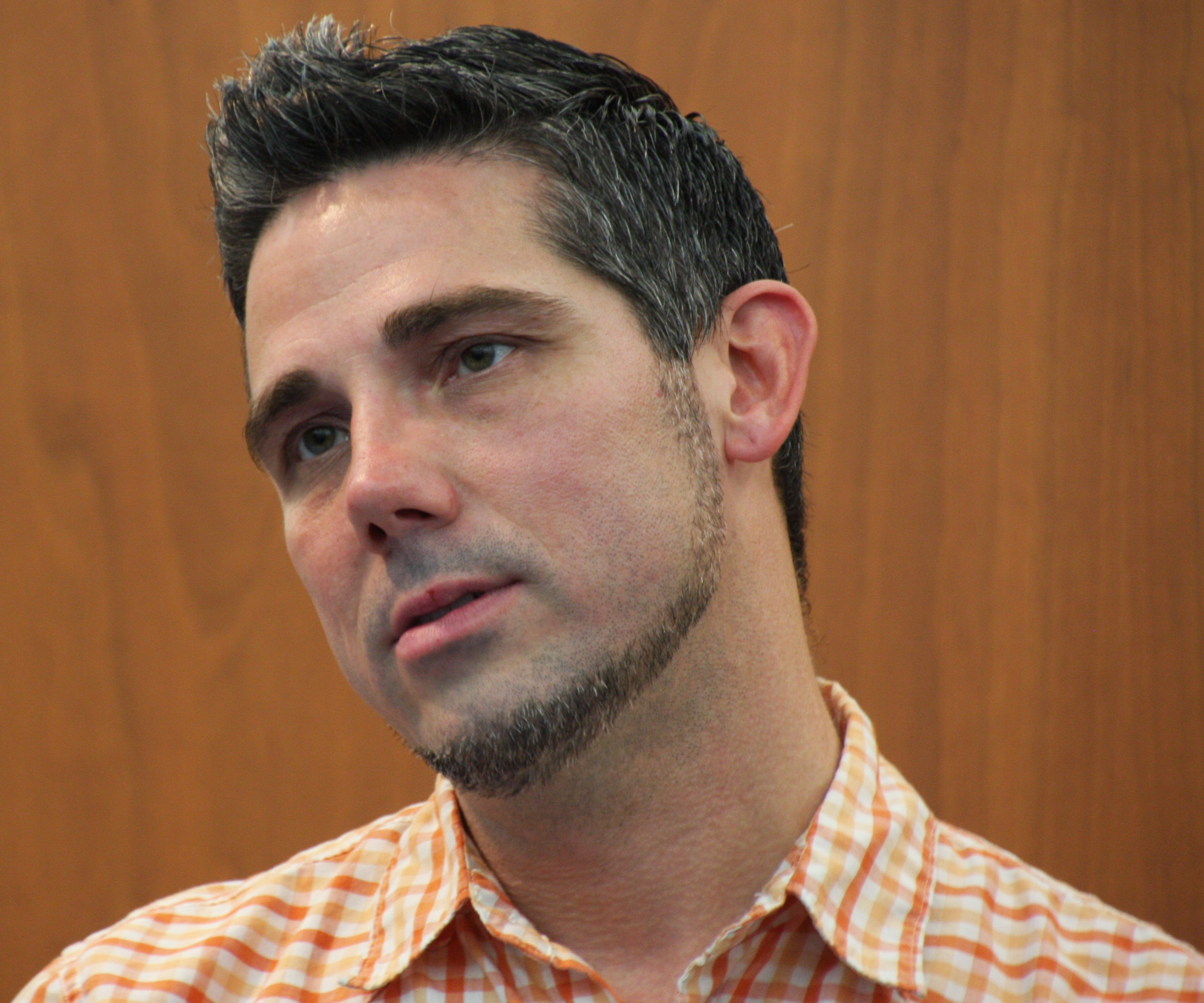
Christopher Straub of season 6

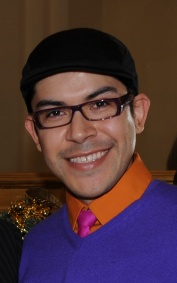
Mondo Guerra of season 8

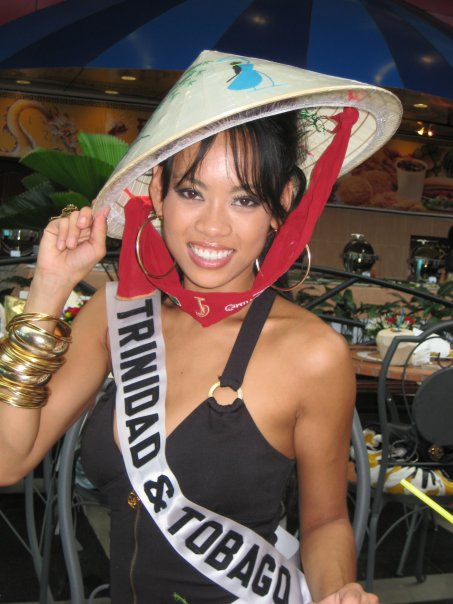
Ayoung-Chee, winner of season 9

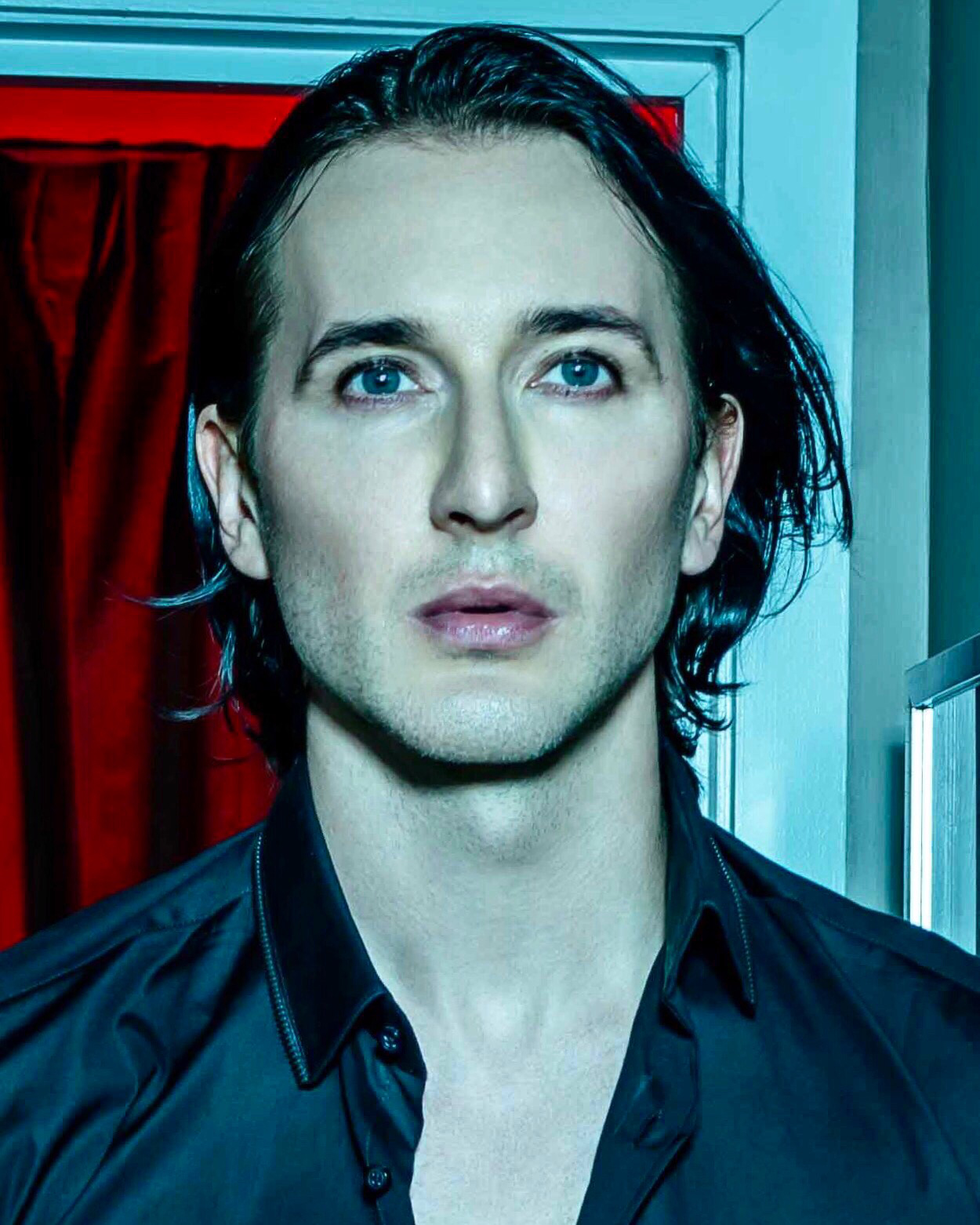
Dmitry Sholokhov, winner of season 10

*	Contestant appeared for a second season

Season	Designer	Age^{[I]}	Hometown	Finish
1	Daniel Franco	33	Los Angeles, California	12th
1	Mario Cadenas	23	Miami, Florida	11th
1	Starr Ilzhoefer	27	Charlotte, North Carolina	10th
1	Vanessa Riley	34	Houston, Texas	9th
1	Nora Caliguri	21	Cheshire, Connecticut	8th
1	Alexandra Vidal	22	Miami, Florida	7th
1	Kevin Johnn	44	New York City, New York	6th
1	Robert Plotkin	28	New York City, New York	5th
1	Austin Scarlett	23	New York City, New York	4th
1	Wendy Pepper	39	Middleburg, Virginia	3rd
1	Kara Saun	37	Los Angeles, California	Runner-up
1	Jay McCarroll	29	Dallas, Pennsylvania	Winner
2	John Wade	24	Los Angeles, California	16th
2	Heidi Standridge	25	Atlanta, Georgia	15th
2	Kirsten Ehrig	37	Los Angeles, California	14th
2	Raymundo Baltazar	24	Los Angeles, California	13th
2	Daniel Franco*	34	Los Angeles, California	12th
2	Guadalupe Vidal	29	Los Angeles, California	11th
2	Marla Duran	51	Allentown, Pennsylvania	10th
2	Diana Eng	22	Jacksonville, Florida	9th
2	Emmett McCarthy	42	New York City, New York	8th
2	Zulema Griffin	28	New York City, New York	7th
2	Andrae Gonzalo	32	Los Angeles, California	6th
2	Nick Verreos	38	Los Angeles, California	5th
2	Kara Janx	29	Johannesburg, South Africa	4th
2	Santino Rice	30	Los Angeles, California	3rd
2	Daniel Vosovic	24	New York City, New York	Runner-up
2	Chloe Dao	33	Houston, Texas	Winner
3	Stacey Estrella	40	San Francisco, California	15th
3	Malan Breton	32	New York City, New York	14th
3	Katherine Gerdes	24	Minneapolis, Minnesota	13th
3	Keith Michael	34	New York City, New York	12th
3	Bonnie Dominguez	31	San Diego, California	11th
3	Bradley Baumkirchner	31	Los Angeles, California	10th
3	Alison Kelly	25	New York City, New York	9th
3	Robert Best	36	Hollywood, California	8th
3	Angela Keslar^{[II]}	33	Amesville, Ohio	7th
3	Vincent Libretti^{[II]}	49	Santa Monica, California	6th
3	Kayne Gillaspie	27	Norman, Oklahoma	5th
3	Mychael Knight	28	Atlanta, Georgia	4th
3	Laura Bennett	42	New York City, New York	3rd
3	Uli Herzner	35	Miami Beach, Florida	Runner-up
3	Jeffrey Sebelia	36	Los Angeles, California	Winner
4	Simone LeBlanc	32	Los Angeles, California	15th
4	Marion Lee	39	Dallas, Texas	14th
4	Carmen Webber	37	New York City, New York	13th
4	Jack Mackenroth	38	New York City, New York	12th
4	Steven Rosengard	29	Chicago, Illinois	11th
4	Elisa Jimenez	42	El Paso, Texas	10th
4	Kevin Christiana	30	New York City, New York	9th
4	Christina "Kit" Scarbo	26	Los Angeles, California	8th
4	Victorya Hong	34	Winchester, Virginia	7th
4	Ricky Lizalde	35	Escondido, California	6th
4	Kathleen "Sweet P" Vaughn	46	Los Angeles, California	5th
4	Chris March^{[III]}	44	New York City, New York	4th
4	Jillian Lewis	26	Selden, New York	3rd
4	Rami Kashou	31	Los Angeles, California	Runner-up
4	Christian Siriano	21	Annapolis, Maryland	Winner
5	Jerry Tam	32	New York City, New York	16th
5	Wesley Nault	23	Blackstone, Massachusetts	15th
5	Emily Brandle	27	Los Angeles, California	14th
5	Jennifer Diederich	27	East Syracuse, New York	13th
5	Kelli Martin	27	Columbus, Ohio	12th
5	Daniel Feld	25	Brooklyn, New York	11th
5	Keith Bryce	26	Salt Lake City, Utah	10th
5	Stella Zotis	42	Queens, New York	9th
5	Blayne Walsh	23	Seattle, Washington	8th
5	Terri Stevens	39	Chicago, Illinois	7th
5	Joe Faris	41	Detroit, Michigan	6th
5	Stephen "Suede" Baum	37	New York City, New York	5th
5	Jerell Scott	28	Los Angeles, California	4th
5	Kenley Collins	25	New York City, New York	3rd
5	Korto Momolu	33	Little Rock, Arkansas	Runner-up
5	Leanne Marshall	27	Portland, Oregon	Winner
6	Ari Fish	25	Kansas City, Missouri	16th
6	Malvin Vien	23	New York City, New York	15th
6	Mitchell Hall	25	Savannah, Georgia	14th
6	Qristyl Frazier	41	New York City, New York	13th
6	Johnny Sakalis	29	West Hollywood, California	12th
6	Ra'mon Lawrence	30	Minneapolis, Minnesota	11th
6	Louise Black	31	Dallas, Texas	10th
6	Rodney Epperson	49	New York City, New York	9th
6	Shirin Askari	23	Richardson, Texas	8th
6	Nicolas Putvinski	26	New York City, New York	7th
6	Logan Neitzel	25	Seattle, Washington	6th
6	Christopher Straub	29	Shakopee, Minnesota	5th
6	Gordana Gelhausen	44	Charleston, South Carolina	4th
6	Carol Hannah Whitfield	23	Charleston, South Carolina	3rd
6	Althea Harper	23	Dayton, Ohio	Runner-up
6	Irina Shabayeva	26	New York City, New York	Winner
7	Christiane King	29	Los Angeles, California	16th
7	Pamela Ptak	47	Bucks County, Pennsylvania	15th
7	Ping Wu	34	Chicago, Illinois	14th
7	Jesus Estrada	21	San Diego, California	13th
7	Anna Lynett	23	Milwaukee, Wisconsin	12th
7	Janeane Marie Ceccanti	27	Portland, Oregon	11th
7	Jesse LeNoir	24	Orlando, Florida	10th
7	Ben Chmura	29	Tampa, Florida	9th
7	Amy Sarabi	25	Oakland, California	8th
7	Maya Luz	21	New York City, New York	7th
7	Jonathan Peters	29	Providence, Rhode Island	6th
7	Anthony Williams^{[IV]}	28	Atlanta, Georgia	5th
7	Jay Nicolas Sario	31	San Francisco, California	4th
7	Mila Hermanovski	40	Los Angeles, California	3rd
7	Emilio Sosa	43	New York City, New York	Runner-up
7	Seth Aaron Henderson^{[IX]}	37	Vancouver, Washington	Winner
8	McKell Maddox	29	Layton, Utah	17th
8	Jason Troisi	33	Greenwich, Connecticut	16th
8	Nicholas D'Azurizio	32	New York City, New York	15th
8	Sarah Trost	27	Toluca Lake, California	14th
8	Kristin Haskins Simms	39	Philadelphia, Pennsylvania	13th
8	A.J. Thouvenot	26	St. Louis, Missouri	12th
8	Peach Carr	50	Lake Forest, Illinois	11th
8	Carlos Casanova	33	Astoria, New York	10th
8	Michael Drummond	31	St. Louis, Missouri	9th
8	Ivy Higa	30	New York City, New York	8th
8	Valerie Mayen	29	Cleveland, Ohio	7th
8	Christopher Collins	30	San Francisco, California	6th
8	April Johnston	21	Savannah, Georgia	5th
8	Michael Costello	27	Palm Springs, California	4th
8	Ari South	23	Waianae, Hawaii	3rd
8	Mondo Guerra	32	Denver, Colorado	Runner-up
8	Gretchen Jones	28	Portland, Oregon	Winner
9	Amanda Perna	25	Ft. Lauderdale, Florida	17th–20th
9	David Chum	29	Philippines	17th–20th
9	Gunnar Deatherage	21	La Grange, Kentucky	17th–20th
9	Serena da Conceicao	31	Kingston, New York	17th–20th
9	Rafael Cox	27	Alamogordo, New Mexico	16th
9	Fallene Wells	29	Las Vegas, Nevada	15th
9	Julie Tierney	35	Baton Rouge, Louisiana	14th
9	Cecilia Motwani	34	Cordoba, Argentina	13th
9	Danielle Everine	26	Minneapolis, Minnesota	12th
9	Joshua Christensen^{[V]}	29	Snohomish, Washington	11th
9	Becky Ross	38	Calumet, Michigan	10th
9	Bryce Black	26	Twin Falls, Idaho	9th
9	Olivier Green	22	Columbus, Ohio	8th
9	Anthony Ryan Auld	28	Linden, Texas	7th
9	Bert Keeter	57	Washington, D.C.	6th
9	Laura Kathleen	26	St. Louis, Missouri	5th
9	Kimberly Goldson	35	Brooklyn, New York	4th
9	Viktor Luna	30	Guadalajara, Mexico	3rd
9	Joshua McKinley	25	Willoughby, Ohio	Runner-up
9	Anya Ayoung-Chee	29	Port-of-Spain, Trinidad and Tobago	Winner
10	Beatrice Guapo	29	Orange County, California	16th
10	Lantie Foster	48	Sacramento, California	15th
10	Andrea Katz	58	Oceanside, New York	14th
10	Kooan Kosuke	30	Himeji, Hyōgo, Japan	13th
10	Buffi Jashanmal	32	Dubai, United Arab Emirates	12th
10	Raul Osorio^{[VI]}	27	Canoga Park, California	11th
10	Nathan Paul	33	Zanesville, Ohio	10th
10	Alicia Hardesty	27	Brandenburg, Kentucky	9th
10	Gunnar Deatherage	22	Hanover, Indiana	8th
10	Ven Budhu	28	Berbice, Guyana	7th
10	Elena Slivnyak	28	Kyiv, Ukraine	6th
10	Sonjia Williams	27	Boston, Massachusetts	5th
10	Christopher Palu	24	Brooklyn, New York	4th
10	Melissa Fleis	31	Rogers City, Michigan	3rd
10	Fabio Costa	29	Belo Horizonte, Brazil	Runner-up
10	Dmitry Sholokhov^{[IX]}	33	Navapolatsk, Belarus	Winner
11	Emily Pollard	24	Richfield, Ohio	16th
11	James Martinez	29	Dallas, Texas	15th
11	Cindy Marlatt	59	Kent, Washington	14th
11	Joseph Aaron Segal	30	Framingham, Massachusetts	13th
11	Matthew Arthur	30	Hammond, Louisiana	12th
11	Benjamin Mach	35	Sydney, Australia	11th
11	Tu Suthiwat Nakchat	26	Chachoengsao, Thailand	10th
11	Katelyn "Kate" Pankoke	23	Eau Claire, Wisconsin	9th
11	Amanda Valentine	31	Lincoln, Nebraska	8th
11	Samantha Black	28	Bronx, New York	7th
11	Richard Hallmarq	39	Sacramento, California	6th
11	Layana Aguilar	28	Governador Valadares, Brazil	5th
11	Daniel Esquivel	49	Dallas, Texas	4th
11	Stanley Hudson	45	Lynwood, California	3rd
11	Patricia Michaels	46	Taos Pueblo, New Mexico	Runner-up
11	Michelle Lesniak Franklin^{[IX]}	34	Portland, Oregon	Winner
12	Angela Bacskocky	33	Richmond, Virginia	16th
12	Kahindo Mateene	34	Goma, Democratic Republic of Congo	15th
12	Timothy Westbrook	24	Wanakena, New York	14th
12	Sandro Masmanidi	28	Krasnodar, Russia	13th
12	Sue Waller	45	Boston, Massachusetts	12th
12	Miranda Kay Levy	29	Wilton, Wisconsin	11th
12	Karen Batts	29	Boca Raton, Florida	10th
12	Jeremy Brandrick	41	Birmingham, England	9th
12	Ken Laurence	24	Birmingham, Alabama	8th
12	Alexander Pope	38	Los Angeles, California	7th
12	Katelyn "Kate" Pankoke*	24	Eau Claire, Wisconsin	6th
12	Helen Castillo	25	Weehawken, New Jersey	5th
12	Bradon McDonald	38	Lowville, New York	4th
12	Justin LeBlanc^{[VII]}	27	Tampa, Florida	3rd
12	Alexandria von Bromssen	38	Stockholm, Sweden	Runner-up
12	Dom Streater^{[IX]}	24	Philadelphia, Pennsylvania	Winner
13	Jefferson Musanda	25	Brooklyn, New York	16th
13	Carrie Sleutskaya	24	Los Angeles, California	15th
13	Angela Sum	32	Los Angeles, California	14th
13	Hernan Lander	33	New York, New York	13th
13	Mitchell Perry	25	Ft. Lauderdale, Florida	12th
13	Kristine Guico	26	Brooklyn, New York	11th
13	Samantha Plasencia	27	San Antonio, Texas	10th
13	Fäde Zu Grau	45	Coral Gables, Florida	9th
13	Sandhya Garg	28	Birmingham, Alabama	8th
13	Alexander Knox	22	Chicago, Illinois	7th
13	Korina Emmerich	28	Brooklyn, New York	6th
13	Emily Payne	41	San Francisco, California	5th
13	Charketa "Char" Glover^{[VIII]}	37	Detroit, Michigan	4th
13	Kiniokahokula "Kini" Zamora	30	Honolulu, Hawaii	3rd
13	Amanda Valentine*	32	Chicago, Illinois	Runner-up
13	Sean Kelly	25	Taranaki, New Zealand	Winner
14	Duncan Chambers-Watson	25	Auckland, New Zealand	16th
14	David Giampiccolo	26	Hollywood, California	15th
14	Hanmiao Yang	27	New York, New York	14th
14	Gabrielle Arruda	27	New York, New York	13th
14	Amanda Perna	25	Delray Beach, Florida	12th
14	Blake Patterson	24	Los Angeles, California	11th
14	Jake Wall	25	San Francisco, California	10th
14	Joseph Charles Poli	37	Las Vegas, Nevada	9th
14	Lindsey Creel	28	Austin, Texas	8th
14	Laurie Underwood	29	Chicago, Illinois	7th
14	Saisha Shinde	34	Mumbai, India	6th
14	Marline Labissiere	32	Savannah, Georgia	5th
14	Candice Cuoco	27	San Francisco, California	4th
14	Edmond Newton	37	Atlanta, Georgia	3rd
14	Kelly Dempsey	31	Boston, Massachusetts	Runner-up
14	Ashley Nell Tipton	23	San Diego, California	Winner
15	Ian Hargrove	30	Chicago, Illinois	16th
15	Linda Marcus	55	Milwaukee, Wisconsin	15th
15	Kimberly "Kimber" Richardson	42	New York, New York	14th
15	Sarah Donofrio	34	Portland, Oregon	13th
15	Alex Snyder	30	San Francisco, California	12th
15	Tasha Henderson	33	Shreveport, Louisiana	11th
15	Brik Allen	26	Baton Rouge, Louisiana	10th
15	Jenni Riccetti	22	San Francisco, California	9th
15	Nathalia JMag	23	Framingham, Massachusetts	8th
15	Dexter Simmons	32	Oakland, California	7th
15	Mah-Jing Wong	28	Philadelphia, Pennsylvania	6th
15	Cornelius Ortiz	24	Boston, Massachusetts	5th
15	Rik Villa	31	Los Angeles, California	4th
15	Laurence Basse	41	Los Angeles, California	3rd
15	Roberi Parra	41	Caracas, Venezuela	Runner-up
15	Erin Robertson	29	Cambridge, Massachusetts	Winner
16	ChaCha	24	Taipei, Taiwan	16th
16	Sentell McDonald	33	New York, New York	15th
16	Kudzanai Karidza	32	Atlanta, Georgia	14th
16	Deyonte Weather	36	Lynnwood, Washington	13th
16	Aaron Meyers	23	Brooklyn, New York	12th
16	Samantha Rei	36	Minneapolis, Minnesota	11th
16	Shawn Buitendorp	27	Grand Ledge, Michigan	10th
16	Claire Buitendorp	27	Grand Ledge, Michigan	9th
16	Batani-Kahlfani	32	Inglewood, California	8th
16	Amy Bond	42	Los Angeles, California	7th
16	Michael Brambila	25	Oakland, California	6th
16	Kenya Freeman	37	Atlanta, Georgia	5th
16	Margarita Alvarez	30	San Juan, Puerto Rico	4th
16	Brandon Kee	24	San Francisco, California	3rd
16	Ayana Ife	24	Salt Lake City, Utah	Runner-up
16	Kentaro Kameyama	37	Los Angeles, California	Winner
17	Cavanagh Baker	26	Nashville, Tennessee	16th
17	Frankie Lewis	30	Louisville, Kentucky	15th
17	Nadine Ralliford	47	Stone Mountain, Georgia	14th
17	Afa Ah Loo	32	Orem, Utah	13th
17	Kovid Kapoor	29	Brooklyn, New York	12th
17	Rakan Shams Aldeen	30	Chicago, Illinois	11th
17	Sonia Kasparian	55	Portland, Oregon	10th
17	Renee Hill	51	Philadelphia, Pennsylvania	9th
17	Lela Orr	29	Dallas, Texas	8th
17	Venny Etienne	31	Dallas, Texas	7th
17	Jamall Osterholm	23	Providence, Rhode Island	6th
17	Tessa Clark	27	Cincinnati, Ohio	5th
17	Bishme Cromartie	27	Baltimore, Maryland	4th
17	Gary "Garo Sparo" Spampinato	45	Salt Lake City, Utah	3rd
17	Hester Sunshine	34	Santa Fe, New Mexico	Runner-up
17	Sebastian Grey	31	Fort Lauderdale, Florida	Winner
18	Jenn Charkow	34	Seattle, Washington	15th/16th
18	Asma Bibi	30	Philadelphia, Pennsylvania	15th/16th
18	Veronica Sheaffer	40	Chicago, Illinois	14th
18	Alan Gonzalez	25	Houston, Texas	13th
18	Tyler Neasloney	29	Jersey City, New Jersey	12th
18	Melanie Trygg	29	Orcas Island, Washington	11th
18	Shavi Lewis	33	Newark, New Jersey	10th
18	Dayoung Kim	37	Portland, Oregon	9th
18	Chelsey Carter	30	Chicago, Illinois	8th
18	Delvin McCray	25	Chicago, Illinois	7th
18	Brittany Allen	29	Fort Smith, Arkansas	5th/6th
18	Marquise Foster	30	Brooklyn, New York	5th/6th
18	Nancy Volpe-Beringer	64	Philadelphia, Pennsylvania	Runner-up
18	Sergio Guadarrama	30	New York, New York	Runner-up
18	Victoria Cocieru	27	Chișinău, Moldova	Runner-up
18	Geoffrey Mac	41	Brooklyn, New York	Winner
19	Caycee Black	40	Brooklyn, New York	16th
19	Meg Ferguson	35	Tulsa, Oklahoma	15th
19	Kenneth Barlis	32	San Diego, California	14th
19	Darren Apolonio	27	Manhattan, New York	13th
19	Sabrina Spanta	29	Bloomfield Hills, Michigan	12th
19	Katie Kortman	40	Yokosuka, Japan	11th
19	Octavio Aguilar	42	Miami, Florida	10th
19	Zayden Skipper	32	Atlanta, Georgia	9th
19	Prajjé Oscar Jean-Baptiste	37	Philadelphia, Pennsylvania	8th
19	Anna Yinan Zhou	32	San Francisco, California	7th
19	Aaron Michael	39	Jackson, Mississippi	6th
19	Bones Jones	30	Harlem, New York	5th
19	Chasity Sereal	31	Houston, Texas	4th
19	Coral Castillo	40	Los Angeles, California	3rd
19	Kristina Kharlashkina	33	New York, New York	Runner-up
19	Shantall Lacayo	37	Miami, Florida	Winner
20	Nora Pagel	39	Metuchen, New Jersey	14th
20	Mila Hermanovski	54	Los Angeles, California	13th
20	Viktor Luna	41	Los Angeles, California	12th
20	Hester Sunshine	38	New York, New York	11th
20	Kayne Gillaspie	44	Nashville, Tennessee	10th
20	Fabio Costa	39	Belo Horizante, Brazil	9th
20	Anna Yinan Zhou	33	San Francisco, California	8th
20	Kara Saun	54	Los Angeles, California	7th
20	Korto Momulu	47	Little Rock, Arkansas	6th
20	Prajjé Oscar Jean-Baptiste	38	Philadelphia, Pennsylvania	5th
20	Rami Kashou	36	New York, New York	4th
20	Brittany Allen	32	Austin, Texas	3rd
20	Laurence Basse	47	Los Angeles, California	Runner-up
20	Bishme Cromartie	32	Los Angeles, California	Winner
21	Caycee Black*	44	Houston, Texas	12th
21	Alex Foxworth	32	Greensboro, North Carolina	11th
21	Angelo Rosa	35	Providence, Rhode Island	10th
21	Joseph McRae	33	Charlotte, North Carolina	9th
21	Madeline Malenfant	30	Nantucket, Massachusetts	8th
21	Joan Madison	60	New York City, New York	7th
21	Yuchen Han	30	Xining, China	6th
21	Belania Daley	34	Long Island, New York	4th/5th
21	Antonio Estrada	36	Mazatlán, Mexico	4th/5th
21	Jesus Estrada	36	Mazatlán, Mexico	Runner-up
21	Ethan Mundt	30	Utica, Minnesota	Runner-up
21	Veejay Floresca	39	Pasay, Philippines	Winner

^{^[I]} Contestant's age at the start of the season
^{^[II]} Angela Keslar and Vincent Libretti were eliminated by judges during episodes 8 and 9, respectively, of season 3, but were brought back due to that season's twist.
^{^[III]} Chris March was eliminated by judges during episode 4 of season 4, but was brought back to the competition following the voluntary departure of Jack Mackenroth.
^{^[IV]} Anthony Williams was eliminated by judges during episode 10 of season 7, but was brought back to the competition following the voluntary departure of Maya Luz.
^{^[V]} Joshua Christensen was eliminated by judges during episode 2 of season 9, but was brought back to the competition following the voluntary departure of Cecelia Motwani.
^{^[VI]} Raul Orosio was eliminated by judges during episode 3 of season 10, but was brought back to the competition following the voluntary departures of Andrea Katz and Kooan Kosuke.
^{^[VII]} Justin LeBlanc was eliminated by judges during episode 6 of season 12, but was given a second chance due to the newly instituted "Tim Gunn Save".
^{^[VIII]} Charketa "Char" Glover was eliminated by judges during episode 6 of season 13, but was given a second chance due to the newly instituted "Tim Gunn Save".
^{^[IX]} Four designers have won the competition twice; Seth Aaron Henderson also won the third season of Project Runway: All Stars and Dmitry Sholokhov also won the fourth season of Project Runway: All Stars. Dom Streater also won the fifth season of Project Runway: All Stars and Michelle Lesniak also won the seventh season of Project Runway: All Stars.

== All Stars Edition contestants ==
Season	Designer	Age^{[I]}	Hometown	Original Season	Original Rank	Finish
1	Elisa Jimenez	49	New York, NY	Season 4	10th	13th
1	Kathleen "Sweet P" Vaughn	53	Pasadena, CA	Season 4	5th	12th
1	Gordana Gehlhausen	47	San Diego, CA	Season 6	4th	11th
1	April Johnston	22	Savannah, GA	Season 8	5th	10th
1	Anthony Williams	30	Atlanta, GA	Season 7	5th	9th
1	Rami Kashou	35	Los Angeles, CA	Season 4	Runner-up	8th
1	Kara Janx	35	New York, NY	Season 2	4th	7th
1	Mila Hermanovski	42	Los Angeles, CA	Season 7	3rd	6th
1	Jerell Scott	32	New York, NY	Season 5	4th	5th
1	Kenley Collins	28	New York, NY	Season 5	3rd	4th
1	Michael Costello	29	Palm Springs, CA	Season 8	4th	3rd
1	Austin Scarlett	28	New York, NY	Season 1	4th	Runner-up
1	Mondo Guerra	33	Denver, CO	Season 8	Runner-up	Winner
2	Peach Carr	52	Lake Forest, IL	Season 8	11th	13th
2	Wendy Pepper	48	Middleburg, VA	Season 1	3rd	12th
2	Stephen "Suede" Baum	42	Barryville, NY	Season 5	5th	11th
2	Andrae Gonzalo	39	New York, NY	Season 2	6th	10th
2	Kayne Gillaspie	33	Nashville, TN	Season 3	5th	9th
2	Althea Harper	28	New Haven, CT	Season 6	Runner-up	8th
2	Carlos Casanova	36	New York, NY	Season 8	10th	7th
2	Laura Kathleen Planck	28	St. Louis, MO	Season 9	5th	6th
2	Ivy Higa	32	New York, NY	Season 8	8th	5th
2	Joshua McKinley	26	New York, NY	Season 9	Runner-up	4th
2	Uli Herzner	41	Miami, FL	Season 3	Runner-up	3rd
2	Emilio Sosa	46	New York, NY	Season 7	Runner-up	Runner-up
2	Anthony Ryan Auld	29	Baton Rouge, LA	Season 9	7th	Winner
3	Ari South	26	Honolulu, HI	Season 8	3rd	11th
3	Daniel Esquivel	49	Austin, TX	Season 11	4th	10th
3	Melissa Fleis	32	San Francisco, CA	Season 10	3rd	9th
3	Mychael Knight	35	Atlanta, GA	Season 3	4th	8th
3	Jeffrey Sebelia	43	Los Angeles, CA	Season 3	Winner	7th
3	Irina Shabayeva	31	New York, NY	Season 6	Winner	6th
3	Viktor Luna	32	New York, NY	Season 9	3rd	5th
3	Christopher Palu	25	Massapequa, NY	Season 10	4th	4th
3	Elena Slivnyak	29	San Francisco, CA	Season 10	6th	3rd
3	Korto Momolu	38	Little Rock, AR	Season 5	Runner-up	Runner-up
3	Seth Aaron Henderson	42	Vancouver, WA	Season 7	Winner	Winner
4	Patricia Michaels	47	Taos Pueblo, NM	Season 11	Runner-up	14th
4	Alexandria von Bromssen	39	San Mateo, CA	Season 12	Runner-up	13th
4	Chris March	51	San Francisco, CA	Season 4	4th	12th
4	Kate Pankoke	25	Chicago, Illinois	Season 11 & 12	9th & 6th	11th
4	Benjamin Mach	36	London, England	Season 11	11th	10th
4	Gunnar Deatherage	24	Louisville, KY	Season 10	8th	9th
4	Samantha Black	29	Fairfield, CT	Season 11	7th	8th
4	Justin LeBlanc	28	Raleigh, NC	Season 12	3rd	7th
4	Jay Sario	35	San Francisco, CA	Season 7	4th	6th
4	Fabio Costa	31	Brooklyn, NY	Season 10	Runner-up	5th
4	Michelle Lesniak	35	Portland, OR	Season 11	Winner	4th
4	Helen Castillo	26	Union City, NJ	Season 12	5th	3rd
4	Sonjia Williams	29	Queens, NY	Season 10	5th	Runner-up
4	Dmitry Sholokhov	35	New York City, NY	Season 10	Winner	Winner
5	Fade zu Grau	46	Coral Gables, FL	Season 13	9th	13th
5	Daniel Franco	43	Los Angeles, CA	Season 11 & 2	12th & 12th	12th
5	Stella Zotis	50	New York, NY	Season 5	9th	11th
5	Mitchell Perry	26	Fort Lauderdale, FL	Season 13	12th	10th
5	Valerie Mayen	35	Cleveland, OH	Season 7	7th	9th
5	Alexander Pope	41	Ridgewood, Queens	Season 12	7th	8th
5	Layana Aguilar	31	New York, NY	Season 11	5th	7th
5	Asha Daniels	26	Cincinnati, OH	Under the Gunn	3rd	6th
5	Emily Payne	42	San Francisco, CA	Season 13	5th	5th
5	Sam Donovan	24	Boston, MA	Under the Gunn	2nd	4th
5	Ken Laurence	26	Atlanta, GA	Season 12	8th	3rd
5	Kini Zamora	32	Kapolei, HI	Season 13	3rd	Runner-up
5	Dom Streater	26	Philadelphia, PA	Season 12	Winner	Winner

== Accessory contestants ==
Designer	Age	State of Residence	Finish
Cotrice Simpson	38	Georgia	12th
Kelly Horton	32	Pennsylvania	11th
David Grieco	40	California	10th
Nicolina Royale	30	California	9th
James Sommerfeldt	29	Illinois	8th
Shea Curry	38	California	7th
Adrian Dana	41	Georgia	6th
Christina Caruso	33	New York	5th
Diego Rocha	36	Illinois	4th
Rich Sandomeno	40	California	3rd
Nina Cortes	26	Florida	Runner-up
Brian Burkhardt	40	Florida	Winner

== Under the Gunn contestants ==
Season	Designer	Age^{[I]}	Hometown	Mentor	Finish
1	Melissa Grimes	29	Birmingham, AL	None	15th
1	Rey Ortiz	32	Añasco, PR	None	14th
1	Amy Sim	53	Portland, OR	None	13th
1	Camila Castillo	47	Caracas, Venezuela	Mondo Guerra	12th
1	Brady Lange	29	Portland, OR	Anya Ayoung-Chee	11th
1	Isabelle Donola	33	New York, NY	Nick Verreos	10th
1	Nicholas Komor	26	Atlanta, GA	Anya Ayoung-Chee	9th
1	Stephanie Ohnmacht	37	Denver, CO	Nick Verreos	8th
1	Michelle Uberreste	29	Burbank, CA	Mondo Guerra	7th
1	Natalia Fedner	30	West Hollywood, CA	Nick Verreos	6th
1	Blake Smith	25	Hoboken, NJ	Anya Ayoung-Chee	5th
1	Shan Keith	33	St. Louis, MO	Anya Ayoung-Chee	4th
1	Asha Daniels	25	Cincinnati, OH	Mondo Guerra	3rd
1	Sam Donovan	23	Newton, MA	Mondo Guerra	Runner-up
1	Oscar Lopez	40	Coral Gables, FL	Nick Verreos	Winner

== Threads contestants ==
Season	Episode	Designer^{[I]}	Age	Hometown	Assistant^{[I]}	Finish^{[II]}
1	1	Kenzie	12	Portland, OR	mother Molly	---
1	1	Cambria	12	West Hills, CA	father David	---
1	1	Bradford	13	Birmingham, AL	mother Dana	Winner
1	2	Aliyah Royale	14	Valley Glen, CA	mother Tanya	---
1	2	Grayson	14	New Orleans, LA	grandmother Seria	---
1	2	Grace	15	La Cañada, CA	mother Peggy	Winner
1	3	Colette	15	Chicago, IL	mother Jill	---
1	3	Emily	15	Quincy, MA	father David	---
1	3	Zachary	15	Berkeley, CA	mother Camille	Winner
1	4	Matt	16	Manhattan Beach, CA	grandmother Dorothy	---
1	4	Claire	13	Braintree, MA	mother Kristen	---
1	4	Brianna	13	Ventura, CA	mother Lori	Winner
1	5	Bella	12	Manhattan Beach, CA	grandmother Nancy	---
1	5	Kimanni	13	Atlanta, GA	mother Rochelle	---
1	5	Tieler	13	New Orleans, LA	mother Tahmi	Winner

^{^[I]}Designers and Assistants were identified by first name only
^{^[II]}Each episode, one winner was determined amongst that episode's three designers

== Junior contestants ==
Season	Designer	Age^{[I]}	Hometown	Finish
1	Sami	16	Westlake Village, California	12th
1	Ysabel	17	Cerritos, California	11th
1	Jesse	16	Swampscott, Massachusetts	Tied 9th
1	Victoria	17	Westlake, Ohio	Tied 9th
1	Matt	17	Manhattan Beach, California	8th
1	Bridget	16	Brockton, Massachusetts	7th
1	Zach	16	Louisville, Kentucky	5th
1	Jaxson	15	Minneapolis, Kansas	6th
1	Zachary^{[II]}	16	Berkeley, California	4th
1	Peytie	15	Carlsbad, California	3rd
1	Samantha	16	Queens, New York	Runner-up
1	Maya	13	Toledo, Ohio	Winner
2	Ruby	14	Barrington, RI	12th
2	Lucas	14	Windermere, FL	11th
2	Rene	17	Dallas, TX	10th
2	A'kai	13	Hauppauge, NY	9th
2	Allie	14	Dayton, OH	8th
2	Cartier	16	Pocatello, ID	7th
2	Zach	17	Fort Collins, CO	6th
2	Tieler	15	Abita Springs, LA	5th
2	Izzy	16	Mount Pleasant, MI	4th
2	Hawwaa	17	Mankato, Minnesota	3rd
2	Chris	17	Calverton, NY	Runner-up
2	Chelsea	15	Chatsworth, CA	Winner

^{^[I]} Contestant's age at the start of the season
^{^[II]}In 2014, Zachary won episode 3 of Project Runway: Threads.
