= Candice Cuoco =

American fashion designer

- Born: April 8, 1988 (age 37); Oakland, California
- Education: Fashion Institute of Design & Merchandising
- Known for: Leather, Black, Strength, Avant-Garde details
- Label: Candice Cuoco
- Website: candicecuoco.com

Candice Cuoco (born April 8, 1988) is an American fashion designer who finished as a finalist on Season 14 of Project Runway and has been on the sixth season of Project Runway All Stars, where she finished in 12th Place.

== Early life and education ==
Candice Cuoco was born on April 8, 1988, in Oakland, California. She attended the Fashion Institute of Design & Merchandising in San Francisco.

== Career ==
In 2015, Project Runway pursued Candice and asked her to audition for Season 14. Candice accepted the offer and went on to win two challenges in total, with her garments regularly chosen among the top designs. Her success carried her to the finale, where she was able to show her collection on schedule at Mercedes Benz Fashion Week, showing alongside her competitors Edmont Newton, Kelly Dempsey and Ashley Nell Tipton, who won the 14th season. Following that, she participated in the sixth season of Project Runway All Stars, placing 12th with her Season 14 colleagues Labissiere, Newton and Dempsey.

In August 2016, she relocated to Los Angeles, where she launched her eponymous label, CANDICE CUOCO, and opened her first brick-and-mortar storefront/showroom.

In April 2017, she debuted her first collection for the new label, "Bad Butterfly", at Los Angeles Fashion Week. The line features leathers and chiffons with stud embellishments and lace appliques. It was created in collaboration with Vanessa Simmons of Run's House and Growing Up Hip Hop, and was featured in the Los Angeles Times. Candice was featured on the third season of the WeTV television program Growing Up Hip Hop, which follows her collaboration with Vanessa Simmons, and the development and production of the "Bad Butterfly" swimwear line, featuring metallic and sheer black fabrics embellished with beaded patches or metal studs.

In September 2017, Cuoco presented her "Sirens" collection at NYFW, in partnership with Style 360. The collection featured silhouettes, fabrics and embellishments inspired by the sea and aquatic creatures.

Cuoco is working on a collaboration with Epson America, designing her own custom fabrics using their fashion technology. She is also designing her next couture collection and custom bespoke pieces for a diverse clientele.

In February 2019, she introduced her ready-to-wear line of clothes.

== Design style ==
Cuoco is known for her skill working with leather, and for her connection to the color black. She creates couture, structured garments, and her designs often incorporate avant-garde details. Candice has said that her signature is confidence and strength., and that she wants her garments to empower women and embody the idea of armor.

== Accolades ==
Cuoco was awarded "Designer of the Year", "Best Emerging Designer" and "Most Stylish" at the San Francisco Fashion Awards.

She has shown collections at New York, London, and Paris Fashion Weeks, and been featured in Vogue, Elle and Galore Magazines, and in the Los Angeles Times.

== Personal life ==
Cuoco has 2 children, Perseaus and Logan.

== See also ==
- List of fashion designers
- List of Project Runway contestants
