= Project Runway All Stars season 6 =

Project Runway All Stars
- Season 6
- Hosted by: Alyssa Milano
- Judges: Georgina Chapman; Isaac Mizrahi
- No. of tasks: 13
- No. of contestants: 16
- Winner: Anthony Williams

Release
- Original network: Lifetime
- Original release: January 4 – April 5, 2018

Season chronology
- ← Previous; Season 5 Next → Season 7

Project Runway All Stars (season 6) is the sixth season of the Project Runway spin-off series Project Runway All Stars. The concept of the edition is Rookies vs. Vets. It features sixteen designers, eight of whom have previously competed on Project Runway All Stars, and eight of whom are part of Project Runway All Stars for the first time. Alyssa Milano returned as host and both Georgina Chapman and Isaac Mizrahi returned as judges for this season, along with one or two guest judges each week. The show premiered on January 4, 2018 on Lifetime.

== Judges ==
In addition to Alyssa Milano both Georgina Chapman and Isaac Mizrahi return as judges for this season. The mentor for this season is Anne Fulenwider. Some of the celebrity guest judges for Project Runway All Stars Season 6 are Jesse Tyler Ferguson, Olivia Culpo, Dita Von Teese, Fashion Designers Rebecca Minkoff, Michael Costello, Danielle Brooks of Orange Is the New Black, Kacey Musgraves, Catherine Zeta-Jones, Whoopi Goldberg, Rosie Perez, Karolina Kurkova, legendary supermodel Carmen Dell'Orefice, and Project Runway All Stars mentor in season 3 to season 5 Zanna Roberts Rassi, Project Runway’s Nina Garcia and Zac Posen, and Project Runway Junior’s Kelly Osbourne, as well as RuPaul.

== Designers ==
Names, locales and ages at time of competition per official site:

== Contestants ==
Contestant	Hometown	Original season(s)	Original placement(s)	Finish	Outcome
Carlos Casanova	New York, NY	Season 8	10	Episode 1	16
Carlos Casanova	New York, NY	All Stars 2	7	Episode 1	16
Kelly Dempsey	Boston, MA	Season 14	2	Episode 2	15
Ari South	Honolulu, HI	Season 8	3	Episode 3	14-13
Ari South	Honolulu, HI	All Stars 3	11	Episode 3	14-13
Melissa Fleis	Los Angeles, CA	Season 10	3	Episode 3	14-13
Melissa Fleis	Los Angeles, CA	All Stars 3	9	Episode 3	14-13
Candice Cuoco	Oakland, CA	Season 14	4	Episode 4	12
Amanda Valentine	Nashville, TN	Season 11	8	Episode 5	11
Amanda Valentine	Nashville, TN	Season 13	2	Episode 5	11
Char Glover	Los Angeles, CA	Season 13	4	Episode 6	10
Kimberly Goldson	Brooklyn, NY	Season 9	4	Episode 7	9
Merline Labissiere	Miami, FL	Season 14	5	Episode 8	8
Joshua McKinley	New York, NY	Season 9	2	Episode 9	7
Joshua McKinley	New York, NY	All Stars 2	4	Episode 9	7
Helen Castillo	Weehawken, NJ	Season 12	5	Episode 10	6
Helen Castillo	Weehawken, NJ	All Stars 4	3	Episode 10	6
Edmond Newton	Atlanta, GA	Season 14	3	Episode 11	5
Ken Laurence	Atlanta, GA	Season 12	8	Episode 12	4
Ken Laurence	Atlanta, GA	All Stars 5	3	Episode 12	4
Fabio Costa	New York, NY	Season 10	2	Episode 13	3-2
Fabio Costa	New York, NY	All Stars 4	5	Episode 13	3-2
Stanley Hudson	West Hollywood, CA	Season 11	3	Episode 13	3-2
Anthony Williams	Atlanta, GA	Season 7	5	Episode 13	1
Anthony Williams	Atlanta, GA	All Stars 1	9	Episode 13	1

== Designer Progress ==
Challenges
Designer	Episode												
Designer	1	2	3	4	5	6	7	8	9	10	11	12	13
Anthony	IN	WIN	HIGH	IN	HIGH	IN	HIGH	LOW	WIN	LOW	LOW	ADV	WINNER
Fabio	IN	IN	WIN	HIGH	WIN	IN	LOW	IN	HIGH	HIGH	HIGH	ADV	RUNNER-UP
Stanley	IN	LOW	IN	WIN	IN	HIGH	WIN	WIN	HIGH	LOW	HIGH	ADV	RUNNER-UP
Ken	LOW	IN	WIN	IN	HIGH	IN	IN	HIGH	LOW	HIGH	WIN	OUT	
Edmond	HIGH	IN	IN	IN	LOW	LOW	IN	LOW	LOW	WIN	OUT		
Helen	LOW	IN	IN	LOW	IN	HIGH	IN	HIGH	IN	OUT			
Joshua	IN	IN	IN	IN	IN	WIN	LOW	IN	OUT				
Merline	WIN	HIGH	LOW	IN	LOW	LOW	HIGH	OUT					
Kimberly	IN	IN	HIGH	HIGH	IN	IN	OUT						
Char	HIGH	LOW	IN	IN	IN	OUT							
Amanda	IN	IN	IN	LOW	OUT								
Candice	IN	IN	LOW	OUT									
Melissa	IN	IN	OUT										
Ari	IN	HIGH	OUT										
Kelly	IN	OUT											
Casanova	OUT												

The designer won Project Runway All Stars: Season 6.
The designer won the challenge.
The designer came in second but did not win the challenge.
The designer had one of the highest scores for that challenge, but did not win.
The designer had one of the lowest scores for that challenge, but was not eliminated.
The designer was in the bottom two, but was not eliminated.
The designer lost and was eliminated from the competition.

== Episodes ==
=== Episode 1: Rookies vs Vets ===
Original airdate: January 4, 2018

Eight all-star Rookies and eight returning all-star Veterans battle to create cohesive collections in the biggest season in All Stars’ history.

- Challenge: Create a fall or spring collection in rookies vs. vets teams
- Guest Judge: Michael Costello
- WINNER: Merline
- ELIMINATED: Casanova

=== Episode 2: Damsels in Distress ===
Original airdate: January 11, 2018

Designers tear, dye and burn to create distressed fashion for a post-apocalyptic runway.

- Challenge: Create a distressed look for a post-apocalyptic runway
- Guest Judge: Danielle Brooks
- WINNER: Anthony
- ELIMINATED: Kelly

=== Episode 3: Perfect Pairings ===
Original airdate: January 18, 2018

Designers pair up to create fashion inspired by food and wine pairings. Whoopi Goldberg joins the judges for All Stars’ first ever double elimination.

Pairings:
Food	Wine
Anthony	Kimberly
Joshua	Amanda
Merline	Candice
Ken	Fabio
Edmond	Helen
Char	Stanley
Melissa	Ari

- Challenge: Create complementary looks inspired by a food and wine pairing
- Guest Judge: Whoopi Goldberg
- WINNER: Fabio & Ken
- ELIMINATED: Melissa & Ari

=== Episode 4: Balls Out! ===
Original airdate: January 25, 2018

In the notorious unconventional challenge, designers use all types of balls to create modern day "ball gowns."

- Challenge: Create "ball gowns" made from balls for a modern day princess
- Guest Judge: Kacey Musgraves
- WINNER: Stanley
- ELIMINATED: Candice

=== Episode 5: Fashion's New Superheroes ===
Original airdate: February 1, 2018

Designers create looks to celebrate a woman’s inner superhero.

- Challenge: Create superhero looks inspired by Rodial's Hero cosmetic products
- Guest Judge: Karolina Kurkova
- WINNER: Fabio
- ELIMINATED: Amanda

=== Episode 6: Thrown for a Loop by Betty Boop ===
Original airdate: February 8, 2018

Betty Boop joins Alyssa on the runway to challenge the designers to create young, chic Hollywood looks.

- Challenge: Create a young, chic Hollywood look for a modern Betty Boop
- Guest Judge: Rebecca Minkoff
- WINNER: Joshua
- ELIMINATED: Char

=== Episode 7: A Kick in the Astro ===
Original airdate: February 22, 2018

RuPaul and Jesse Tyler Ferguson join the judging panel for a spectacular avant-garde runway.

- Challenge: Create an avant-garde look inspired by the cosmos
- Guest Judge: Jesse Tyler Ferguson & RuPaul
- WINNER: Stanley
- ELIMINATED: Kimberly

=== Episode 8: Mizrahi Madness ===
Original airdate: March 1, 2018

Isaac Mizrahi's exhibit serves as inspiration for colorful party looks; legendary supermodel Carmen Dell'Orefice serves as a guest judge.

Assigned Colors
Designer	Dominant Color
Stanley	Pink
Ken	Red
Fabio	Green
Anthony	Yellow
Helen	Purple
Edmond	Orange
Joshua	Teal
Merline	Blue

- Challenge: Create a spring party look using a dominant and complementary color
- Guest Judge: Carmen Dell'Orefice
- WINNER: Stanley
- ELIMINATED: Merline

=== Episode 9: Posen on the Red Carpet ===
Original airdate: March 8, 2018

Zac Posen invites the designers into his personal studio to gather material for red carpet looks that showcase a signature technique.

- Challenge: Create a red carpet look showcasing your signature technique
- Guest Judge: Rosie Perez & Zac Posen
- WINNER: Anthony
- ELIMINATED: Joshua

=== Episode 10: Rock Your Face Off ===
Original airdate: March 15, 2018

The designers face off against one another to create performance wear for a music superstar.

Face Off Pairings:
Rock	Country	Pop
Stanley	Fabio	Anthony
Edmond	Helen	Ken

- Challenge: Create an outfit for a pop, rock or country performance
- Guest Judge: Olivia Culpo
- Guest mentor: Rebecca Minkoff
- WINNER: Edmond
- ELIMINATED: Helen

=== Episode 11: Nina's Crushing It ===
Original airdate: March 22, 2018

Nina Garcia challenges the designers to create resort wear inspired by different Candy Crush lands.

- Challenge: Create a resort wear look inspired by different lands in the Candy Crush kingdom
- Guest Judge: Nina Garcia & Kelly Osbourne
- WINNER: Ken
- ELIMINATED: Edmond

=== Episode 12: History in the Making ===
Original airdate: March 29, 2018

At the Smithsonian in Washington, D.C., designers are challenged to create six-piece collections; a surprise runway sends one designer home early.

- Challenge: Create a six-piece collection to make your mark in American Fashion History
- Twist: Create a signature look for an exclusive runway presentation
- Guest Judge: Dita Von Teese & Zanna Roberts Rassi
- ADVANCED: Stanley, Fabio, & Anthony
- ELIMINATED: Ken

=== Episode 13: Making Fashion History ===
Original airdate: April 5, 2018

The final three designers race to create seven-piece collections that make their mark in fashion history; guest judges Catherine Zeta-Jones and Zac Posen.

- Challenge: Create a seven-piece collection to make your mark in American fashion history
- Guest Judge: Catherine Zeta-Jones & Zac Posen
- WINNER: Anthony
- ELIMINATED: Fabio & Stanley
