= Project Runway season 15 =

Project Runway
- Season 15
- No. of tasks: 14
- No. of contestants: 16
- Winner: Erin Robertson
- No. of episodes: 14

Release
- Original network: Lifetime
- Original release: September 15 – December 29, 2016

Season chronology
- ← Previous; Season 14 Next → Season 16

Project Runway Season 15 is the fifteenth season of the television show Project Runway, appearing on Lifetime. The season began on September 15, 2016, and attracted 1.72 million total viewers. There are 16 designers competing to become "the next great American designer." Supermodel Heidi Klum, Marie Claire creative director Nina Garcia, and fashion designer Zac Posen are all returning as judges this season. Tim Gunn maintains his role as the workroom mentor. Traci Inglis joins as a guest judge.

In May 2016, Lifetime renewed Project Runway for three more seasons (16, 17 and 18) in a deal with The Weinstein Company.

== Contestants ==
Contestant	Age	Hometown	Finish	Outcome
Ian Hargrove	30	Chicago, IL	Episode 1	16th place
Linda Marcus	55	Milwaukee, WI	Episode 2	15th place
Kimber Richardson	42	New York City, NY	Episode 3	14th place
Sarah Donofrio	34	Portland, OR	Episode 4	13th place
Alex Snyder	30	San Francisco, CA	Episode 5	12th place
LaTasha “Tasha” Henderson	33	Shreveport, LA	Episode 6	11th place
Brik Allen	26	Baton Rouge, LA	Episode 7	10th place
Jenni Riccetti	22	San Francisco, CA	Episode 9	9th place
Nathalia JMag	23	Framingham, MA	Episode 10	7th place
Dexter Simmons	32	Oakland, CA	Episode 10	7th place
Mah-Jing Wong	28	Philadelphia, PA	Episode 11	6th place
Cornelius Ortiz	24	Boston, MA	Episode 12	5th place
Rik Villa	31	Los Angeles, CA	Episode 14	4th place
Laurence Basse	41	Los Angeles, CA	Episode 14	3rd place
Roberi Parra	32	Caracas, Venezuela	Episode 14	Runner-up
Erin Robertson	29	Cambridge, MA	Episode 14	Winner

== Models ==
- Anna Buckles
- Alla Z. Roldan
- Alysia Beckford
- Britt Brooks
- Juanita B. Bledman
- Karina Villa
- Chekesha "Keke" Johnson
- Kristy B. Kautious
- Lais Scheffler
- Meandra Nel
- Paola Horber
- Priscilla Cox
- Sherica Maynard
- Stacy Anderson
- Theresa Hess
- Tirzah Evora

=== Extra Models for the 2 Part Finale ===
- Ji Young Baek (Part 1)
- Ya Bi (Part 1)

== Designer progress ==
Designer Elimination Table
Designers	1	2	3	4	5	6	7	8	9	10	11	12	13	14
Erin	WIN	HIGH	WIN	IN	HIGH	LOW	LOW	LOW	LOW	HIGH	WIN	HIGH	ADV	WINNER
Roberi	LOW	IN	IN	HIGH	LOW	IN	IN	WIN	HIGH	IN	HIGH	WIN	ADV	RUNNER-UP
Laurence	IN	WIN	IN	IN	HIGH	HIGH	WIN	HIGH	IN	IN	HIGH	LOW	ADV	3RD PLACE
Rik	IN	IN	LOW	WIN	LOW	HIGH	IN	HIGH	WIN	LOW	HIGH	LOW	ADV	4TH PLACE
Cornelius	IN	IN	HIGH	IN	LOW	IN	LOW	SAFE	IN	WIN	LOW	OUT		
Mah-Jing	IN	IN	LOW	IN	LOW	IN	IN	IN	HIGH	HIGH	OUT			
Dexter	HIGH	IN	IN	IN	WIN	IN	HIGH	LOW	IN	OUT				
Nathalia	IN	IN	IN	IN	LOW	LOW	HIGH	IN	LOW	OUT				
Jenni	IN	IN	HIGH	LOW	HIGH	WIN	IN	IN	OUT					
Brik	LOW	LOW	IN	IN	HIGH	IN	OUT							
Tasha	HIGH	IN	IN	LOW	HIGH	OUT								
Alex	IN	HIGH	IN	HIGH	OUT									
Sarah	IN	IN	IN	OUT										
Kimber	IN	LOW	OUT											
Linda	IN	OUT												
Ian	OUT													

The designer won Project Runway Season 15.
The designer advanced to Fashion Week.
The designer won the challenge.
The designer came in second but did not win the challenge.
The designer had one of the highest scores for that challenge, but did not win.
The designer had one of the lowest scores for that challenge, but was not eliminated.
The designer was in the bottom two, but was not eliminated.
The designer lost and was eliminated from the competition.
The designer lost, but was brought back to the competition by Tim Gunn.

Model Elimination Table
Model	1	2	3	4	5	6	7	8	9	10	11	12	13	14
Sherica	ER	ER	BA	RV	CO, RV	RP	MJ	ER	-	RV	MJ	RV	ER	1ST PLACE (ER)
Karina	MJ	JR	LB	TH	LB, TH	NJ	RV	JR	-	DS	LB	ER	RP	2ND PLACE (RP)
Alla	RV	MJ	AS	MJ	AS	TH	JR	NJ	-	CO	RP	RP	LB	3RD PLACE (LB)
Paola	RP	KR	MJ	DS	NJ, RP	CO	BA	CO	-	LB	CO	LB	RV	4TH PLACE (RV)
Britt	SD	AS	NJ	BA	DS	DS	ER	LB	-	NJ	RV	ER	RP	RV
Tirzah	KR	LB	JR	SD	-	RV	LB	MJ	-	RP	ER	CO	RP	ER
Juanita	LB	NJ	TH	JR	ER	BA	CO	-	-	ER	OUT	LB	ER	RV
Alysia	LM	SD	RP	CO	MJ	ER	RP	-	-	MJ	OUT	RV	RV	MJ
Lais	NJ	RV	KR	ER	BA, JR	JR	NJ	-	-	OUT	OUT	CO	-	-
Priscilla	IH	CO	ER	AS	-	MJ	DS	RV	-	OUT	OUT	RP	RV	MJ
Kristy	JR	RP	SD	NJ	-	LB	OUT	-	-	-	-	-	LB	RV
Keke	TH	BA	RV	LB	-	OUT								
Meandra	AS	LM	CO	RP	-	OUT								
Anna	BA	DS	DS	OUT										
Theresa	CO	TH	OUT											
Stacy	DS	OUT												

The model won Project Runway Season 15.
The model wore the winning designer for that challenge.
The model wore the 2nd best designer for that challenge.
The model wore the 3rd best designer for that challenge.
The model wore one of the lowest score designers for that challenge, but was not eliminated.
The model wore the 2nd to the lowest score designer, but was not eliminated.
The model wore the losing design that challenge.
The model was eliminated.

Designer Legend

- Alex Snyder: AS
- Brik Allen: BA
- Cornelius Ortiz: CO
- Dexter Simmons: DS
- Erin Robertson: ER
- Ian Hargrove: IH
- Jenni Riccetti: JR
- Kimber Richardson: KR
- Laurence Basse: LB
- Linda Marcus: LM
- Mah-Jing Wong: MJ
- Nathalia JMag: NJ
- Rik Villa: RV
- Roberi Parra: RP
- Sarah Donofrio: SD
- Tasha Henderson: TH

== Episodes ==
=== Episode 0: Road to the Runway ===
Original airdate: September 15, 2016

- Host Tim Gunn introduced season 15’s designers including home and closet tours.

=== Episode 1: An Unconventional Launch Party ===
Original airdate: September 15, 2016

- The 16 designers were tasked to create an outfit that incorporated “the spirit, the aura and the vibe” of the launch party. This was an unconventional materials challenge with the party decorations serving as the materials.
- Judges: Heidi Klum, Nina Garcia, Zac Posen
- Guest Judge: Savannah Guthrie
- WINNER: Erin
- ELIMINATED: Ian

=== Episode 2: Just Fabulous! ===
Original airdate: September 22, 2016

- In one day and with $150, contestants designed a look for the everyday woman. The winning look was reproduced and sold on JustFab.com.
- Judges: Heidi Klum, Nina Garcia, Zac Posen
- Guest Judge: Nina Dobrev
- WINNER: Laurence
- ELIMINATED: Linda

=== Episode 3: Blacklight or Daylight? ===
Original airdate: September 29, 2016

- Contestants designed a look that would be shown under a black light on the runway.
- Judges: Heidi Klum, Nina Garcia, Zac Posen
- Guest Judge: Jaime King
- WINNER: Erin
- ELIMINATED: Kimber

=== Episode 4: Sink or Swim ===
Original airdate: October 6, 2016

- In one day contestants designed a swimsuit and cover up. The winning look was reproduced and sold as part of Heidi Klum's swim collection.
- Judges: Heidi Klum, Nina Garcia, Zac Posen
- Guest Judge: Lucky Blue Smith
- WINNER: Rik
- ELIMINATED: Sarah

=== Episode 5: There's No "I" in "Team" ===
Original airdate: October 13, 2016

- The designers were split into two teams of six to create a four piece mini collection. Each team's budget was determined by their pitch to a group of investors, the judges, who each had $1,000 to invest. Each member of the winning team received $5,000 from Mary Kay.

Team Unity	House of Bouton
Rik, Roberi, Cornelius, Mah-Jing, Nathalia, and Alex	Erin, Laurence, Dexter, Jenni, Tasha, and Brik

- Team Unity was given $800 and House of Bouton was given $2,200
- House of Bouton was the winning team
- Judges: Heidi Klum, Nina Garcia, Zac Posen
- Guest Judge: Sabrina Carpenter
- WINNER: Dexter
- ELIMINATED: Alex

=== Episode 6: There IS Crying in Fashion ===
Original airdate: October 20, 2016

- While attending a press cocktail party, the designers are challenged with creating a cocktail dress inspired by the party venue.
- Guest Judge: Emily Ratajkowski
- WINNER: Jenni
- ELIMINATED: Tasha

=== Episode 7: Welcome to the Urban Jungle ===
Original airdate: October 27, 2016

- The designers take a trip to Universal Studios theme park in Florida. They are then tasked to create a look inspired by the ride "Skull Island Reign of Kong" to create street wear looks.
- Judges: Heidi Klum, Nina Garcia, Zac Posen
- Guest Judges: Rebecca Minkoff, Carly Chaikin
- WINNER: Laurence
- ELIMINATED: Brik

=== Episode 8: Project Pop Up ===
Original airdate: November 3, 2016

- The designers were split into three teams of three and tasked to create a collection inspired by one of the Sally Beauty colors. They presented the final collections in a Pop-Up Shop in downtown New York City. The public was allowed to voted on their favorite looks which accounted for 20% of the teams' final judging score. Team Neutral received the most votes from the public while Team Blue impressed the judges more and were deemed the best of the week.

Team Neutral	Team Blue	Team Red
Mah-Jing, Nathalia, and Jenni	Rik, Roberi, and Laurence	Erin, Cornelius, and Dexter

- Judges: Heidi Klum, Nina Garcia, Zac Posen
- Guest Judge: Kelly Osbourne
- WINNER: Roberi
- SAVED: Cornelius

=== Episode 9: Life is Full of Surprises ===
Original airdate: November 10, 2016

- The designers are pleasantly surprised when each one of them is visited by a special guest from home. But the emotional reunions with their mothers, daughters, and friends are quickly overshadowed by the drama of the next challenge when the designers learn that their newly arrived loved ones will also be their clients—and there is $50,000 on the line!
- Judges: Heidi Klum, Nina Garcia, Zac Posen
- Guest Judges: Olivia Culpo and Katia Beauchamp
- WINNER: Rik
- ELIMINATED: Jenni

=== Episode 10: A Power Trip ===
Original airdate: November 17, 2016

- After having a helicopter flight over New York, the designers were tasked to create a high-fashion editorial look for a powerful woman, inspired by their flight. The winning look will be featured in a spread in Marie Claire magazine.
- Judges: Heidi Klum, Nina Garcia, Zac Posen
- Guest Judges: Anne Fulenwider, Camilla Belle
- WINNER: Cornelius
- ELIMINATED: Nathalia and Dexter

=== Episode 11: Bold Innovation ===
Original airdate: December 1, 2016

- The first-ever hybrid challenge tasks the clothiers to fashion innovative avant-garde looks by using unconventional fabric and conventional metal-themed materials. Included: a memorable runway.
- Judges: Heidi Klum, Nina Garcia, Zac Posen
- Guest Judges: Shiri Appleby
- WINNER: Erin
- ELIMINATED: Mah-Jing

=== Episode 12: An Unconventional Trip ===
Original airdate: December 8, 2016

- New York Fashion Week is just around the corner, but the designers are reminded that this is the last challenge before the finale. A major surprise is in order for the designers, they're going to Austin Texas! Once they arrive, they are informed that the next challenge is an unconventional one and encouraged to really think outside the box as they pursue a general store for supplies. After they visit Stubb's Barbecue Store for Austin memorabilia. Back in New York, they all seem to be second-guessing themselves and, of course, there's yet another twist. Tim tells the designers they must also craft a second look to go along with their first creation and not all the designers have time working on their side.
- Judges: Heidi Klum, Nina Garcia, Zac Posen
- Guest Judge: Georgina Chapman and Priyanka Chopra
- WINNER: Roberi
- ELIMINATED: Cornelius

=== Episode 13: Finale Part 1 ===
Original airdate: December 15, 2016

- It's the final four and they are on their way to New York Fashion Week. Commencing their 10 piece collections each designer is given $9000. Visiting the designers at home, Tim Gunn is not impressed with everything they've created so far; the designers return to New York and present three pieces from their collections; Michael Kors returns as a guest judge.
- Judges: Heidi Klum, Nina Garcia, Zac Posen
- Guest Judge: Michael Kors

=== Episode 14: Finale Part 2 ===
Original airdate: December 22, 2016

- The final four designers present their collections New York Fashion Week.
- Judges: Heidi Klum, Nina Garcia, Zac Posen
- Guest Judge: Zendaya
- WINNER: Erin
- ELIMINATED: Roberi (2nd place), Laurence (3rd place), Rik (4th place)

=== Episode 15: Season 15 Reunion ===
Original airdate: December 29, 2016

- The designers reunite to sew up Season 15 as they reflect on the highs, lows and memorable moments from their time on the show. Host: Tim Gunn.
