= Patricia O'Connor (educator) =

American educator (born 1940)

Patricia Goosey O’Connor
- Born: October 2, 1940 (age 86); United States
- Education: San Diego State University
- Occupation: Educator
- Years active: 1963–present
- Employer: Fashion Careers College (founder)
- Organization: Fashion Careers College
- Known for: Founder of Fashion Careers College
- Board member of: Timken Museum of Art; American Friends of the Zandra Rhodes Museum

Patricia Goosey O’Connor (born October 2, 1940) is an American educator best known as the founder of Fashion Careers College (FCC), a former fashion and merchandising school based in San Diego, California.

== Life and career ==
O’Connor graduated from San Diego State University in 1963 and began her teaching career with the San Diego Unified School District. She later taught for one year in the Berkeley Unified School District before returning to San Diego in 1965.

She subsequently accepted a part-time position at the Patricia Stevens Modeling School, where she helped develop a fashion merchandising program. O’Connor served as both director and instructor of the program for nine years before founding Fashion Careers College in January 1979 in Mission Valley.

Throughout her career, O’Connor has participated in various educational and professional organizations related to vocational and fashion education. She served on the Joint Committee responsible for developing a Master Plan for Education spanning kindergarten through the University of California system and on the advisory board of the California Bureau for Private Postsecondary and Vocational Education. She also served in the Consumer and Family Studies Division of the Vocational Education Board for the San Diego Unified School District.

O’Connor was a member of the Board of Directors of Educational Talent Search and of Fashion Group International of San Diego, Inc. She was also appointed chair of the Board of Directors of the American Friends of the Zandra Rhodes Museum in London, United Kingdom.

O’Connor founded the Annual Golden Hanger Fashion Awards Gala, serving as its chair for 23 years. She also established an annual event at the Timken Museum of Art titled The Art of Fashion, in which fashion design students presented interpretations of costumes depicted in works from the museum’s permanent collection.

In 2009, she was appointed to the museum’s Board of Directors and has also served there as a docent and guest lecturer.
