= Fashion Careers College =

Former for-profit fashion school in San Diego, California

Coordinates: 32.7808°N 117.2072°W

- Former names: Fashion Careers College of California
- Type: For-profit
- Active: 1979–2013
- Location: San Diego, California, United States

Fashion Careers College (FCC) was a for-profit college located in San Diego, California, United States, established to provide a collegiate-level education for students seeking careers in the fashion industry. Founded by Patricia O'Connor in 1979, the college closed in January 2013.

== Programs ==
FCC offered 2-year associate degrees in Fashion Merchandising, Fashion and Fabric Consulting, and Fashion/Apparel Design and one-year certificates in Fashion Merchandising and Fashion/Apparel Design.

== Accreditation ==
FCC was accredited by the Accrediting Council for Independent Colleges and Schools (ACICS) from 1983 until its closure in 2013. It was also approved by the California Bureau for Private Postsecondary and Vocational Education.

== Notable alumni ==
- Ashley Nell Tipton (born 1991), Project Runway contestant
