= Project Runway season 12 =

Project Runway
- Season 12
- No. of tasks: 14
- No. of contestants: 16
- Winner: Dom Streater
- No. of episodes: 14

Release
- Original network: Lifetime
- Original release: July 18 – October 17, 2013

Season chronology
- ← Previous; Season 11 Next → Season 13

Project Runway Season 12 is the twelfth season of the television show Project Runway, appearing on Lifetime. The season began airing on July 18, 2013 with 15 designers competing to become "the next great American designer." Kate Pankoke, a designer from Season 11 returned to compete once again for the grand prize. Pankoke was voted back by fans in an online poll, winning against Ra'mon Lawrence Coleman of Season 6, and Valerie Mayen of Season 8.

Supermodel Heidi Klum, Marie Claire creative director Nina Garcia, and fashion designer Zac Posen all returned as judges this season. Tim Gunn returned as the workroom mentor. This was also the first season to feature the "Tim Gunn save," which gave Gunn the opportunity to bring an eliminated designer back into the competition if he disagreed with the judges.

Belk was the exclusive retail sponsor for Project Runway's 12th season and merchandised the accessory wall with an assortment of products.

In 2014, Alexandria von Bromssen, Kate Pankoke, Justin LeBlanc and Helen Castillo competed in the fourth season of Project Runway All Stars, with Alexandria placing 13th, Kate placing 11th, Justin placing 7th and Helen placing 3rd. In 2016, Alexander Pope, Ken Laurence and Dom Streater competed in the fifth season of All Stars, with Alexander placing 8th, Ken placing 3rd and Dom winning the competition. Helen Castillo and Ken Laurence would later reappear in Project Runway All Stars (season 6) where Helen placed 6th and Ken placed 4th.

== Contestants ==
Contestant	Age	Hometown	Finish	Outcome
Angela Bacskocky	33	Richmond, Virginia	Episode 1	16th place
Kahindo Mateene	34	Goma, Democratic Republic of Congo	Episode 2	15th place
Timothy Westbrook	24	Wanakena, New York	Episode 3	14th place
Sandro Masmanidi	28	Krasnodar, Russia	Episode 4	Withdrew
Sue Waller	45	Boston, Massachusetts	Episode 5	12th place
Miranda Kay Levy	29	Wilton, Wisconsin	Episode 7	11th place
Karen Batts	29	Boca Raton, Florida	Episode 8	10th place
Jeremy Brandrick	41	Birmingham, United Kingdom	Episode 9	9th place
Ken Laurence	24	Birmingham, Alabama	Episode 10	8th place
Alexander Pope	38	Los Angeles, California	Episode 11	6th place
Kate Pankoke*	24	Eau Claire, Wisconsin	Episode 11	6th place
Helen Castillo	25	Weehawken, New Jersey	Episode 13	5th place
Bradon McDonald	38	Lowville, New York	Episode 14	4th place
Justin LeBlanc	27	Tampa, Florida	Episode 14	3rd place
Alexandria von Bromssen	38	Stockholm, Sweden	Episode 14	Runner-up
Dom Streater	24	Philadelphia, Pennsylvania	Episode 14	Winner

^{*}Kate Pankoke, designer in Project Runway (season 11), was voted back by fans to this season.

== Designer Progress ==
Designer Elimination Table
Designers	1	2	3	4^{2}	5^{3}	6	7	8	9^{4}	10	11	12	13	14	Eliminated Episode
Dom	IN	HIGH	HIGH	HIGH	IN	IN	IN	IN	WIN	IN	WIN	HIGH	ADV	WINNER	14 - Finale, Part 2
Alexandria	IN	IN	HIGH	IN	LOW	WIN	HIGH	LOW	IN	LOW	IN	LOW	ADV	RUNNER-UP	14 - Finale, Part 2
Justin	IN	IN	LOW	IN	IN	SAFE	IN	IN	IN	HIGH	LOW	LOW	ADV	3RD PLACE	14 - Finale, Part 2
Bradon	WIN	IN	IN	WIN	IN	IN	LOW	IN	WIN	HIGH	HIGH	WIN	ADV	4TH PLACE	14 - Finale, Part 2
Helen	IN	LOW	WIN	IN	IN	IN	WIN	WIN	IN	WIN	HIGH	LOW	OUT		13 - Finale, Part 1
Kate	IN	WIN	HIGH	HIGH	HIGH	IN	IN	HIGH	HIGH	IN	OUT				11 - Next Generation
Alexander	IN	IN	LOW	IN	IN	HIGH	IN	HIGH	HIGH	LOW	OUT				11 - Next Generation
Ken	IN	IN	IN	IN	LOW	LOW	HIGH	LOW	LOW	OUT					10 - Project Runway SuperFan!
Jeremy	IN	IN	IN	LOW	WIN	HIGH	LOW	IN	OUT						9 - Let's Do Brunch!
Karen	IN	IN	IN	IN	HIGH	LOW	IN	OUT							8 - Having a Field Day
Miranda	LOW^{1}	IN	LOW	LOW	IN	IN	OUT								7 - Shoes First!
Sue	HIGH	IN	IN	LOW	OUT										5 - YOU Choose Your Materials!
Sandro	LOW	HIGH	IN	WD											4 - Tie the Knot
Timothy	LOW	LOW	OUT												3 - An Unconventional Coney Island
Kahindo	IN	OUT													2 - Million Dollar Runway
Angela	OUT														1 - Sky's The Limit

- Scores are based on the Project Runway website
- ^Note 1: Miranda originally had one of the higher scores, however the judges reconsidered their scores since she had not used enough of the challenge material (the parachute) for her dress. She was told that, despite her outfit being good, she did not follow the rules. Therefore, she could be disqualified and eliminated from the competition.
- ^Note 2: Because Sandro was missing, all three of the lowest-scoring designers (Miranda, Jeremy, and Sue) were safe.
- ^Note 3: Before leaving the runway, Heidi told Alexander, Bradon and Miranda that they were close to being the winning team.
- ^Note 4: Dom was initially called in the bottom along with Jeremy and Ken. However, the bottom three designers were given an extra hour in the workroom to make alterations to their outfit or redesign a new one. The judges gave Dom's second dress such high marks that it was named the second winner of the challenge.

the designer won Project Runway Season 12.
The designer was advanced to Fashion Week.
The designer won the challenge.
The designer had the second highest scores.
The designer had one of the highest scores for that challenge, but did not win.
The designer had one of the lowest scores for that challenge, but was not eliminated.
The designer was in the bottom two, but was not eliminated.
The designer lost and was eliminated from the competition.
The designer withdrew from the competition.
The designer lost, but was saved from elimination by Tim Gunn.

Model Elimination Table
Model	1	2	3	4	5	6	7	8	9	10	11	12	13	14
Rayuana	DS	DS	DS,AV	DS	AP	DS	DS	KL	DS	-	DS	DS	-	WINNER (DS)
Ya	BM	BM	BM,KB	BM	BM	AV	AV	BM	BM	-	BM	AV	AV	AV
Ji Young	AP	AP	-	AP	SW	AP	AP	AP	AP	-	AP	JL	JL	JL
Cameron	KB	KB	-	KB	KL	KP	KP	KP	KP	-	KP	BM	-	BM
Molly	SW	KP	HC,KP	KP	HC	HC	HC	HC	HC	-	HC	HC	HC	OUT
Roberta	HC	JB	JB,KL	JB	KP	JB	JB	KB	JL	-	JL	OUT		
Laura	KL	KL	-	KL	AV	KL	KL	DS	KL	-	AV	OUT		
Nastasia	TW	HC	-	HC	ML	BM	BM	AV	AV	-	OUT			
Briana	JB	JL	AP,JL	JL	JL	JL	JL	JB	JB	-	OUT			
Shaya	ML	ML	-	ML	JB	ML	ML	JL	OUT					
Liliana	JL	SW	-	SW	DS	KB	KB	OUT						
Jessica	AV	AV	-	AV	KB	OUT								
Viktoria	SM	SM	SM,SW	SM	OUT									
Sophie	KP	TW	TW,ML	OUT										
Jillian	KM	KM	OUT											
Sierra	AB	OUT												

The model won Project Runway Season 12.
The model wore the winning design that challenge.
The model wore the design with the second highest scores.
The model wore the design with one of the highest scores.
The model wore the design that had one of the lowest scores.
The model wore the design that landed in the bottom two.
The model wore the losing design that challenge.
The model was eliminated.

- In episode 10, the models were not needed in the challenge.

Models

- Rayuana Aleyce
- Ya Bi
- Ji Young Baek
- Cameron Corrigan
- Molly Fletcher
- Roberta Little
- Laura O'Neall
- Nastasia Ohl
- Briana Holmer
- Shaya Ali
- Liliana Nova
- Jessica Solis
- Viktoria Pleshakova
- Sophie Lloyd
- Jillian Billingham
- Sierra Illig

Designer Legend

- Alexander Pope: AP
- Alexandria von Bromssen: AV
- Angela Bacskocky: AB
- Bradon McDonald: BM
- Dom Streater: DS
- Helen Castillo: HC
- Jeremy Brandrick: JB
- Justin LeBlanc: JL
- Kahindo Mateene: KM
- Karen Batts: KB
- Kate Pankoke: KP
- Ken Laurence: KL
- Miranda Kay Levy: ML
- Sandro Masmanidi: SM
- Sue Waller: SW
- Timothy Westbrook: TW

== Episodes ==
=== Episode 1: Sky's The Limit ===
Original airdate: July 18, 2013

- In the Season 12 opener, the designers arrive on an airport runway and then must create looks from parachute materials. Kate Pankoke from Season 11 was voted to return to the show by fans.
- Judges: Heidi Klum, Nina Garcia, Zac Posen
- Guest Judge: Kate Bosworth
- WINNER: Bradon
- ELIMINATED: Angela

=== Episode 2: Million Dollar Runway ===
Original airdate: July 25, 2013

- Designers create looks paired with precious jewels.
- Judges: Heidi Klum, Nina Garcia, Zac Posen
- Guest Judge: Eric Daman
- WINNER: Kate
- ELIMINATED: Kahindo

=== Episode 3: An Unconventional Coney Island ===
Original airdate: August 1, 2013

- Working in pairs, designers must give away samples of frozen yogurt while asking the samplers for words to describe the yogurt. The pairs must choose three of the words as inspiration for their designs and then create an outfit using unconventional materials won by playing carnival games at Coney Island.

Teams
Alexander and Justin
Alexandria and Dom
Bradon and Karen
Helen and Kate
Jeremy and Ken
Miranda and Timothy
Sandro and Sue

- Judges: Heidi Klum, Nina Garcia, Zac Posen
- Guest Judge: Kelly Osbourne
- WINNER: Helen
- ELIMINATED: Timothy

=== Episode 4: Tie the Knot ===
Original airdate: August 8, 2013

- The contestants must create a look incorporating bow ties provided by Tie The Knot organization.
- Judges: Heidi Klum, Nina Garcia, Zac Posen
- Guest Judge: Jesse Tyler Ferguson
- WINNER: Bradon
  - After winning the challenge, Bradon proposed to his partner of 18 years, Josh. A week later, Josh proposed to Bradon over video call, after informing him of the legalization of same-sex marriage in California, their home state.
- WITHDREW: Sandro
  - Despite being safe from elimination, Sandro got into a fight with Zac Posen on the runway about his design. He then went back to the waiting room and got into a verbal altercation with Helen and Ken, at which point he stormed out. Tim Gunn informed the judges that Sandro was missing, which led to all three of the lowest-scoring designers (Miranda, Jeremy, and Sue) being safe. Sandro later apologized to Helen and Ken for his behavior during the next challenge before he went home.

=== Episode 5: YOU Choose Your Materials! ===
Original airdate: August 15, 2013

- Working in small teams, the designers have to use items from two of three retailers as their material to create a luxurious collection. The stores were a vintage wallpaper store, a party supply/homewares store, and a food market.

Team Members	The Places They Chose To Get Materials
Jeremy, Karen, Kate	Party/Home Goods Store & Food Market
Bradon, Alexander, Miranda	Wallpaper Store & Party/Home Goods Store
Dom, Helen, Justin	Wallpaper Store & Food Market
Alexandria, Ken, Sue	Wallpaper Store & Party/Home Goods Store

- Judges: Heidi Klum, Nina Garcia, Zac Posen
- Guest Judge: June Ambrose
- WINNER: Jeremy
- ELIMINATED: Sue

=== Episode 6: Let's Go Glamping! ===
Original airdate: August 22, 2013

- The designers go on a luxury overnight camping trip, with campsite surroundings serving as style inspirations for this challenge.
- Judges: Heidi Klum, Nina Garcia, Zac Posen
- Guest Judge: Allison Williams
- WINNER: Alexandria
- SAVED: Justin

=== Episode 7: Shoes First! ===
Original airdate: August 29, 2013

- The designers have to create a look inspired by shoes from the Marie Claire shoe closet.
- Judges: Heidi Klum, Nina Garcia, Zac Posen
- Guest Judge: Kaley Cuoco & Anne Fulenwider
- WINNER: Helen
- ELIMINATED: Miranda

=== Episode 8: Having a Field Day ===
Original airdate: September 5, 2013

- The designers have to create high-end performance wear for Heidi Klum's New Balance line. Because they won a team athletics challenge at the beginning of the episode, Dom and Justin both received one extra hour of working time.
- Judges: Heidi Klum, Nina Garcia, Zac Posen
- Guest Judge: Michael Kors
- WINNER: Helen
- ELIMINATED: Karen

=== Episode 9: Let's Do Brunch ===
Original airdate: September 12, 2013

- The designers have to create a vibrant look for the Belk shopper, a modern southern woman. The winning look will be sold in Belk Shops and online. Dom, Ken & Jeremy were the bottom three, and the judges decided to give them one hour to change or make their garments into stunning pieces.
- Judges: Heidi Klum, Nina Garcia, Zac Posen
- Guest Judge: Stacy Keibler & John Thomas
- WINNERS: Bradon & Dom
- ELIMINATED: Jeremy

=== Episode 10: Project Runway SuperFan! ===
Original airdate: September 19, 2013

- The designers have to create a look for a Project Runway SuperFan!
- Judges: Heidi Klum, Zac Posen
- Guest Judge: Zanna Roberts Rassi (sitting in for Nina Garcia), Erin Fetherston
- WINNER: Helen
- ELIMINATED: Ken

=== Episode 11: Next Generation... ===
Original airdate: September 26, 2013

- The designers get their inspiration from young next generation personalities, who are making a difference.
- Judges: Heidi Klum, Nina Garcia, Zac Posen
- Guest Judge: Peter Som
- WINNER: Dom
- ELIMINATED: Alexander & Kate

=== Episode 12: Butterfly Effect ===
Original airdate: October 3, 2013

- The designers are on pins and needles when they're affected by a previous double elimination. In a fashion test, they must take a risk and spin out an avant-garde look inspired by butterflies. As a twist, and for the first time ever on Project Runway, the designers are given a second "make it work" challenge: to take a previous losing look from the season and transform it into a winning look.
- Judges: Heidi Klum, Nina Garcia, Zac Posen
- Guest Judge: Emmy Rossum
- WINNER: Bradon
- ELIMINATED: None

=== Episode 13: Finale, Part 1 ===
Original airdate: October 10, 2013

- In Part 1 of the two-part Season 12 finale, the remaining designers journey home to work on their lines, with Tim Gunn paying them visits.
- Judges: Heidi Klum, Nina Garcia, Zac Posen
- Guest Judge: None
- ADVANCED: Bradon, Dom, Justin, Alexandria
- ELIMINATED: Helen

=== Episode 14: Finale, Part 2 ===
Original airdate: October 17, 2013

- The finalists present their collections at Lincoln Center. The winner of Project Runway Season 12 is announced.
- Judges: Heidi Klum, Nina Garcia, Zac Posen
- Guest Judge: Kerry Washington
- WINNER: Dom
- ELIMINATED: Alexandria, Justin and Bradon

=== Episode 15: Reunion Special ===
Original airdate: October 24, 2013

- After the Finale, the designers reunite to discuss their journey on Project Runway.
