= Project Runway season 14 =

Project Runway
- Season 14
- No. of tasks: 14
- No. of contestants: 16
- Winner: Ashley Nell Tipton
- No. of episodes: 14

Release
- Original network: Lifetime
- Original release: August 6 – November 12, 2015

Season chronology
- ← Previous; Season 13 Next → Season 15

Project Runway Season 14 is the fourteenth season of the television show Project Runway, appearing on Lifetime. The season began on August 6, 2015. There were 16 designers competing to become "the next great American designer." Supermodel Heidi Klum, Marie Claire creative director Nina Garcia, and fashion designer Zac Posen all returned as judges this season. Tim Gunn maintained his role as the workroom mentor.

In a post-season interview Tim Gunn expressed his disappointment with the designers of this season citing a deficiency of energy in them for the title. He stated that he 'hated' the entire season labeling the progress of the contestants as 'lackluster'.

In 2018, Kelly Dempsey, Candice Cuoco, Merline Labissiere and Edmond Newton competed in the Project Runway All Stars (season 6), with Kelly placing 15th, Candice placing 12th, Merline placing 8th and Edmond placing 5th of 16.

== Contestants ==
Contestant	Age	Hometown	Finish	Outcome
Duncan Chambers-Watson	25	Auckland, New Zealand	Episode 1	16th place
David Giampiccolo	26	Hollywood, CA	Episode 2	15th place
Hanmiao Yang	27	New York City, NY	Episode 3	14th place
Gabrielle Arruda	27	New York City, NY	Episode 4	13th place
Amanda Perna	28	Delray Beach, FL	Episode 5	12th place
Blake Patterson	24	Los Angeles, CA	Episode 6	11th place
Jake Wall	36	San Francisco, CA	Episode 7	10th place
Joseph Charles Poli	37	Las Vegas, NV	Episode 7	9th place
Lindsey Creel	28	Johnson City, TN	Episode 8	8th place
Laurie Underwood	29	Chicago, IL	Episode 9	7th place
Swapnil Shinde^{1}	34	Mumbai, India	Episode 10	6th place
Merline Labissiere	32	Savannah, GA	Episode 11	5th place
Candice Cuoco	27	San Francisco, CA	Episode 14	4th place
Edmond Newton	37	Atlanta, GA	Episode 14	3rd place
Kelly Dempsey	31	Boston, MA	Episode 14	Runner-up
Ashley Nell Tipton	23	San Diego, CA	Episode 14	Winner

^Note 1: Swapnil renamed Saisha after season 14, when transitioning.

== Designer progress ==
Designer Elimination Table
Designers	1	2	3	4	5^{1}	6	7	8	9	10	11	12^{2}	13	14	Eliminated Episode
Ashley	WIN	IN	WIN	IN	LOW	HIGH	HIGH	LOW	HIGH	LOW	LOW	LOW	ADV	WINNER	14 – Finale, Part 2
Kelly	IN	HIGH	IN	IN	LOW	IN	WIN	HIGH	LOW	WIN	WIN	WIN	ADV	RUNNER-UP	14 – Finale, Part 2
Edmond	HIGH	WIN	LOW	IN	WIN	IN	HIGH	HIGH	WIN	LOW	HIGH	SAFE	ADV	3RD PLACE	14 – Finale, Part 2
Candice	IN	IN	WIN	HIGH	LOW	IN	IN	WIN	HIGH	LOW	HIGH	HIGH	ADV	4TH PLACE	14 – Finale, Part 2
Merline	HIGH	IN	LOW	IN	HIGH	WIN	IN	IN	LOW	HIGH	OUT				11 – The Runway's in 3D!
Swapnil	IN	HIGH	HIGH	HIGH	HIGH	HIGH	LOW	IN	LOW	OUT					10 – Crew's All In
Laurie	IN	IN	HIGH	IN	LOW	LOW	IN	LOW	OUT						9 – Make It Sell
Lindsey	IN	IN	HIGH	LOW	LOW	IN	LOW	OUT							8 – Broadway or Bust
Joseph	IN	IN	LOW	IN	HIGH	IN	OUT								7 – Haute Tech Couture
Jake	IN	IN	HIGH	IN	HIGH	LOW	WD								7 – Haute Tech Couture
Blake	LOW	HIGH	IN	WIN	HIGH	OUT									6 – Lace to the Finish
Amanda	IN	LOW	LOW	LOW	OUT										5 – Gunn and Heid
Gabrielle	IN	IN	LOW	OUT											4 – Fashion Flip
Hanmiao	LOW	IN	OUT												3 – Shut Up and Sew
David	IN	OUT													2 – It's All in the Cards
Duncan	OUT														1 – Mad Dash Mayhem

^1: In episode 5, although the judges categorized all the clothes into ones they liked and didn't like, their deliberation revealed the ones they liked the most (Edmond, Jake, and Swapnil). Similarly, the ones they liked the least were revealed when Amanda, Candice, and Kelly were left as the three in danger of going home, while Ashley, Laurie, and Lindsey were called safe.
^2: In episode 13, Tim Gunn decided to retroactively use his "Tim Gunn Save" on Edmond, canceling out his elimination in episode 12.

The designer won Project Runway Season 14.
The designer advanced to Fashion Week.
The designer won the challenge.
The designer came in second but did not win the challenge.
The designer had one of the highest scores for that challenge, but did not win.
The designer had one of the lowest scores for that challenge, but was not eliminated.
The designer was in the bottom two, but was not eliminated.
The designer lost and was eliminated from the competition.
The designer lost, but was brought back to the competition by Tim Gunn.
The designer withdrew from the competition.

== Model progress ==
Model Progress Table
Model	1	2	3	4	5	6	7	8	9	10 ^{1}	11	12	13	14
Aube	EN	BP	–	BP	BP	AT	AT	AT	AT	–	AT	AT	–	AT
Kristina	KD	KD	AT, CC	KD	KD	ML	KD	KD	KD	–	KD	KD	KD	KD (2ND)
Zorana	ML	EN	BP, KD	EN	EN	–	EN	EN	EN	–	EN	EN	EN	EN (3RD)
Loli	AT	AT	–	AT	AT	CC	CC	CC	CC	–	CC	CC	–	CC (4TH)
Helen	DG	DG	JW, LC	ML	ML	EN	ML	ML	ML	–	ML	OUT		
Emoni	SS	SS	AP, GA	SS	SS	KD	SS	SS	SS	–	OUT			
Alina	JP	JP	–	JP	JP	JP	JP	LU	LU	–	OUT			
Dominyka	LC	LC	JP, ML	LC	LC	LC	LC	LC	OUT					
Veronica	HY	HY	–	LU	LU	SS	LU	OUT						
Hannah	DW	AP	EN, HY	AP	–	JW	OUT							
Victoria K.	GA	GA	–	GA	AP	LU	OUT							
Victoria W.	JW	JW	–	JW	JW	BP	OUT							
Ashley	CC	CC	–	CC	CC	OUT								
Natacha	LU	LU	LU, SS	OUT										
Sherry	BP	ML	–	OUT										
Sara	AP	OUT												

^1: In episode 10, the designers had other clients as their models.

The model was paired with the winning designer of Project Runway Season 16.
The model wore the design that advanced the designer to fashion week.
The model wore the winning design.
The model wore the design with the second-highest score.
The model wore the design with one of the highest scores but did not win.
The model wore the design with one of the lowest scores.
The model wore the design that landed in the bottom 2.
The model wore the losing design.
The model was eliminated.

== Model assignments ==
Designer Legend

- Amanda Perna: AP
- Ashley Nell Tipton: AT
- Blake Patterson: BP
- Candice Cuoco: CC
- David Giampiccolo: DG
- Duncan Chambers Watson: DW
- Edmond Newton: EN
- Gabrielle Arruda: GA
- Hanmiao Yang: HY
- Jake Wall: JW
- Joseph Charles Poli: JP
- Kelly Dempsey: KD
- Laurie Underwood: LU
- Lindsey Creel: LC
- Merline Labissiere: ML
- Swapnil Shinde: SS

== Episodes ==
=== Episode 0: Road to the Runway ===
Original airdate: July 30, 2015

=== Episode 1: Mad Dash Mayhem ===
Original airdate: August 6, 2015

- The sixteen designers of Project Runway Season 14 went to Madison Square Garden for their first challenge. They had to create a look that expressed themselves as designers using fabrics found around the arena. Before the designers began to work, Tim Gunn announced to the designers that David, Swapnil, and Merline didn't bring their own personal tool kits while everyone else did.
- Judges: Heidi Klum, Nina Garcia, Zac Posen
- Guest Judge: Hannah Davis
- WINNER: Ashley
- ELIMINATED: Duncan

=== Episode 2: It's All in the Cards ===
Original airdate: August 13, 2015

- The fifteen designers go to Hallmark where they have two minutes to choose as many Hallmark Signature cards as possible to create a look. They had to use the cards as their materials and their inspiration. David and Ashley (who had immunity) were both told by the judges that they didn't follow the rules because there was exposed muslin.
- Judges: Heidi Klum, Nina Garcia, Zac Posen
- Guest Judge: Ashley Tisdale
- WINNER: Edmond
- ELIMINATED: David

=== Episode 3: Shut Up and Sew ===
Original airdate: August 20, 2015

- Global travel destinations and exotic locations inspire the designers (in teams of two) to create looks tailored for a day-to-night transition.

Location for inspiration	Designers	Team Ranking
Greek Isles	Kelly and Blake	Safe
India	Laurie and Swapnil	High
Venice	Candice and Ashley	High
The Caribbean	Edmond and Hanmiao	Low
Hong Kong	Jake and Lindsey	High
South of France	Amanda and Gabrielle	Low
St. Petersburg	Merline and Joseph	Low

- Judges: Heidi Klum, Nina Garcia, Zac Posen
- Guest Judge: Tracee Ellis Ross
- WINNERS: Ashley and Candice
- ELIMINATED: Hanmiao

=== Episode 4: Fashion Flip ===
Original airdate: August 27, 2015

- The designers visit Mood and put a modern twist on a classic design.
- Judges: Heidi Klum, Nina Garcia, Zac Posen
- Guest Judge: Kiernan Shipka
- WINNER: Blake
- ELIMINATED: Gabrielle

=== Episode 5: Gunn and Heid ===
Original airdate: September 3, 2015

- Tensions arise when the designers are split into two teams to battle for their fabrics in a paintball competition; the teams receive a surprise.
- Judges: Heidi Klum, Nina Garcia, Zac Posen
- Guest Judge: Kelly Osbourne, Lisa Perry
- WINNER: Edmond
- ELIMINATED: Amanda

=== Episode 6: Lace to the Finish ===
Original airdate: September 10, 2015

- The designers are tasked to create lingerie for host Heidi Klum's fashion line. They also get a rude awakening on the runway.
- Judges: Heidi Klum, Nina Garcia, Zac Posen
- Guest Judge: Bella Thorne
- WINNER: Merline
- ELIMINATED: Blake

=== Episode 7: Haute Tech Couture ===
Original airdate: September 17, 2015

- Fashion and technology collide when the designers seek recycled electronics in dumpsters in the season's second unconventional-materials challenge.
- Judges: Heidi Klum, Nina Garcia, Zac Posen
- Guest Judge: Paula Patton, Anne Fulenwider
- WINNER: Kelly
- ELIMINATED: Joseph
- WITHDREW: Jake
  - Jake withdrew from the competition after receiving news that his dog had to be euthanized.

=== Episode 8: Broadway or Bust ===
Original airdate: September 24, 2015

- The magic of Broadway inspires the designers, who create stylish looks based on the musical "Finding Neverland".
- Judges: Heidi Klum, Nina Garcia, Zac Posen
- Guest Judge: Coco Rocha
- WINNER: Candice
- ELIMINATED: Lindsey

=== Episode 9: Make It Sell ===
Original airdate: October 1, 2015

- The designers must create ready-to-wear looks to be reproduced and sold online; a disagreement between the judges leads to the most contentious runway yet.

Style Persona	Designer	Ranking
Trendsetter	Kelly	Low
Bombshell	Swapnil	Low
Trendsetter	Candice	High
Bombshell	Edmond	Win
Girl Next Door	Ashley	High
Modern Classic	Laurie	Out
Femme Nouveau	Merline	Low

- Judges: Heidi Klum, Nina Garcia, Zac Posen
- Guest Judge: Ciara, Yuchin Mao
- WINNER: Edmond
- ELIMINATED: Laurie

=== Episode 10: Crew's All In ===
Original airdate: October 8, 2015

- The designers must makeover real women from the Project Runway crew. Tim reaches his breaking point with one designer.
- Judges: Heidi Klum, Nina Garcia, Zac Posen
- Guest Judge: Shiri Appleby, Constance Zimmer
- WINNER: Kelly
- ELIMINATED: Swapnil

=== Episode 11: The Runway's in 3D! ===
Original airdate: October 15, 2015

- In a fashion-forward challenge, the designers use 3D-printing technology to create avant-garde styles.
- Judges: Heidi Klum, Nina Garcia, Zac Posen
- Guest Judge: Mel B.
- WINNER: Kelly
- ELIMINATED: Merline

=== Episode 12: Roll Out the Red Carpet ===
Original airdate: October 22, 2015

- The designers land in Los Angeles to create red-carpet looks in the final challenge before Fashion Week.
- Judges: Heidi Klum, Nina Garcia, Zac Posen
- Guest Judge: Christian Siriano
- WINNER: Kelly
- ELIMINATED: Edmond

=== Episode 13: Finale, Part 1 ===
Original airdate: October 29, 2015

- In Part 1 of the two-part Season 14 finale, the designers journey home to create their collections and gear up for a visit from mentor Tim Gunn. They then return to New York, complete with a twist.
- TIM GUNN SAVE: Edmond.

=== Episode 14: Finale, Part 2 ===
Original airdate: November 5, 2015

- Conclusion. The winning designer is crowned in the Season 14 finale. Before that, the designers scramble to retool their collections following a brutal critique with the judges. Appearing: Carrie Underwood.
- Judges: Heidi Klum, Nina Garcia, Zac Posen
- Guest Judge: Carrie Underwood
- WINNER of Project Runway: Ashley
- ELIMINATED: Kelly (2nd place), Edmond (3rd place), Candice (4th place)

=== Episode 15: Season 14 Reunion ===
Original airdate: November 12, 2015

- The designers reunite to sew up Season 14 as they reflect on the highs, lows and memorable moments from their time on the show. Host: Tim Gunn.
- This season included a special prize for the designer who had won the most challenges throughout the competition. A reward of $25,000 was therefore awarded by Mary Kay to Kelly Dempsey for winning 4 challenges.
