= Jack Mackenroth =

American swimmer, model, and fashion designer

- Born: April 29, 1969 (age 57); Seattle, Washington, U.S.
- Education: University of California, Berkeley; Parsons School of Design, New York City
- Occupations: Fashion designer, model, swimmer, HIV educator and activist

Jack Mackenroth (born April 29, 1969) is an American swimmer, model, and fashion designer who competed in the fourth season of American reality show Project Runway.

== Life ==
Mackenroth was pre-med at the University of California, Berkeley, following in the footsteps of his mother, who was a nurse at Seattle's Harborview Medical Center, but later graduated with a double degree in Fine Arts and Sociology.

== Career ==
=== Design ===
In 1991, Mackenroth moved to New York City to study Fashion Design at Parsons School of Design. After Parsons, he opened a menswear store on Bleecker Street in New York City's West Village called "Jack". In 1997, Mackenroth went to work for Tommy Hilfiger and then designed for Levis Slates brand. From 2003 to 2007, he was the design director at Weatherproof Active Wear.

On October 15, 2008, Mackenroth unveiled a custom-designed wedding gown crafted entirely of condoms as a visual reminder of the importance of safer sex and correct, consistent condom use for San Francisco's Project Inform.

=== Modeling ===
As a fitness and fashion model through the 1990s, Mackenroth appeared in magazines such as Paper, DNR, Men's Fitness, Men's Journal, Men's Health, Genre, Blue (Australia) and L'Uomo Vogue . After Project Runway, he graced the covers of magazines including reFresh, POZ, HIVplus, and Gloss. His fashion illustrations have also been featured in Nylon, Elle, and in ad campaigns for Tommy Hilfiger and Sushi Clothing.

In 2008, Mackenroth appeared as an extra in the Sex and the City movie as "Hot Guy #17."

=== Swimming ===
Mackenroth was a competitive swimmer in elementary and high school and continued competing after college at the Masters level. He earned three All-American titles, and in the summer of 2006, he set a national record for the breaststroke leg of the 4 x 50 meter relay at the Masters World Championships in Stanford, California.

Mackenroth competed without a team in the Gay Games in 1990 in Vancouver, British Columbia, and won a bronze medal in the 50-meter breaststroke. He has won at least one gold medal in every one of the international competitions since.

He competed in the 2009 Outgames, in Copenhagen, Denmark, and the 2010 Gay Games in Cologne, Germany, where he earned seven medals.

== Project Runway ==
=== Early win ===
Mackenroth appeared in Season 4 of Project Runway. He won the third challenge in the competition, which was to create an outfit for guest judge Tiki Barber. Barber wore the winning design during an appearance on The Today Show.

=== Withdrawal from competition ===
At the fifth challenge, Mackenroth decided to withdraw after a contagious staph infection. After leaving the show, Mackenroth spent five days in the hospital recovering from the infection (MRSA) where he received an IV antibiotic twice daily.

=== "Living Positive by Design" ===
In 2008, Mackenroth partnered with Merck & Co., Inc. to launch a national HIV and AIDS education campaign called Living Positive By Design. Living Positive By Design events have been held in Miami/Fort Lauderdale, Florida at the 2008 United States Conference on AIDS (USCA), Atlanta, Georgia and in New York City at the Gay Men's Health Crisis (GMHC) Fashion Forward 2008 fundraiser.

=== HIV ===
Mackenroth was the first spokesperson for the anti-stigma campaign HIV Equal. The hope being that people will finally stop using the term HIV in a derogatory manner and stop discriminating against people with HIV. He has also served as the media strategist at Housing Works - a non-profit in New York, which fights the dual crisis of homelessness and HIV/AIDS where he created the Prep Heroes Campaign prepheroes.org. He was a spokesman for the Merck Pharmaceuticals HIV Education Campaign, "Living Positive by Design" for four years.

In January 2016, he was named Wet Platinum Man of the Year for 2015.

Most recently he created the "HIV Shower Selfie Challenge" media campaign which went viral and achieved over 26 million impressions in one week using the hashtag #weareallclean. The campaign was translated into eight languages and covered in over one hundred media outlets.
