= Dexter Simmons =

American fashion designer (born 1983)

- Born: August 27, 1983 (age 42); Oakland, California
- Citizenship: American
- Label: Dexter Simmons
- Website: http://www.dextersimmons.com

Dexter Simmons (born August 27, 1983) is an American fashion designer and reality TV competitor living in Oakland, California. They have appeared in Project Runway and Rihanna's Styled to Rock, a fashion design TV competition show aired on Bravo and Lifetime.

== Early life and career ==
Dexter Simmons is an American fashion designer raised in Oakland, California. They were on the first season of Styled to Rock in 2013, for which Rihanna was the executive producer. Other mentors included Pharrell Williams, Erin Wasson, and Mel Ottenberg. They appeared on the fifteenth season of Project Runway in 2015. Their clothing line was presented at the Style Fashion Week L.A. and San Diego Fashion Week in 2013. Their 2017 collection was featured in New York at Style Fashion Week New York. They have consistently been a featured designer in Dark Beauty Magazine throughout 2016. They appeared on San Diego Living with celebrity designer Andre Soriano in 2013.
