= Ashley Nell Tipton =

American fashion designer (born 1991)

Ashley Nell Tipton (born 1991) is an American plus-size clothing designer. She is best known for being the winner of season 14 of Project Runway.

== Early life ==
Tipton grew up in Encanto, San Diego. She learned how to sew at the age of 7 from her grandmother. She attended University City High School, and later graduated from Fashion Careers College in 2012.

Tipton was invited to showcase at the 2012 Full Figure Fashion Week in New York. She subsequently quit her retail jobs at Torrid and The Gap.

== Career ==
Tipton launched her first clothing line in 2013. She was working out of her garage when she applied to be on Project Runway. She was cast to be on season 14, which aired in 2015. She was the first designer in the franchise to cater towards plus-sized women, and won the grand-prize of the show.

Tipton's win was contentious. Tim Gunn, despite being a vocal proponent of plus-sized women's wear, panned Tipton's winning collection as "hideous". In an op-ed for The Washington Post, he stated that Tipton's victory "reeked of tokenism."

Following her run on Project Runway, Tipton partnered with JCPenney in 2016 to produce a plus-size clothing line. By 2017, she launched her own brand and started a jewelry line.

In 2025, Tipton was brought on as an instructor at the San Diego College of Continuing Education.

== Personal life ==
Tipton is Mexican-American. She underwent gastric bypass surgery in 2017, with some fans feeling that she betrayed the fat acceptance movement in doing so.
