= Kimberly Goldson =

American fashion designer

- Born: Brooklyn, New York
- Education: Fashion Institute of Technology
- Occupation: Fashion designer
- Website: www.kimberlygoldson.com

Kimberly Goldson is an American fashion designer and former finalist on Project Runway. She is also the founder of her namesake fashion line, Kimberly Goldson, exhibiting at shows such as New York Fashion Week.

== Early life and education ==
Goldson was born and raised in Brooklyn, New York. She was inspired by fashion at an early age and attended Fashion Institute of Technology where she studied fashion merchandising.

== Career ==
Goldson started her career as a fashion designer by creating custom garments for private clients.

Goldson has been a contestant on the Project Runway reality television show, including Project Runway All Stars. She tried out for Season 6 of the show but was told she needed more experience. She returned three years later and was a finalist in Season 9. In Season 6 of Project Runway All Stars, she was eliminated in episode 7.

Goldson was one of the creators of LeBron James' women's shoe known as "The Strongest" campaign. It was his 16th Nike shoe release and designed exclusively by women for women. Nike used three African American women designers, Goldson, Fe Noel and Undra Duncan, who were handpicked by multicultural designer platform, Harlem’s Fashion Row for the project.

Goldson is the founder of her own fashion brand, "Kimberly Goldson". She has exhibited at shows such as Mercedes-Benz Fashion Week and Harlem's Fashion Row during New York Fashion Week.
