= Bradon McDonald =

American fashion designer and dancer

Bradon McDonald (born May 14, 1975 in Watertown, New York) is an American fashion designer and a modern dancer from "Mark Morris Dance Group".

== Early life and education ==
Bradon McDonald is a graduate of the Juilliard School (1997) and a recipient of the Princess Grace Award and a National ARTS Foundation award. He performed with the Limón Dance Company for three years. As a dancer with the Mark Morris Dance Group from 2000 to 2010, McDonald danced many of the roles that Mark Morris originally made for himself.

== Design career ==
McDonald began designing while dancing, then enrolled in the Fashion Institute of Design & Merchandising (FIDM) in Los Angeles in 2010, immediately after leaving MMDG. He participated in Project Runway (season 12); he made it to the finale, where he placed runner-up to the top 3. In the fourth episode of the competition, which he won, he proposed to his partner.
