= Zac Posen =

American fashion designer (born 1980)

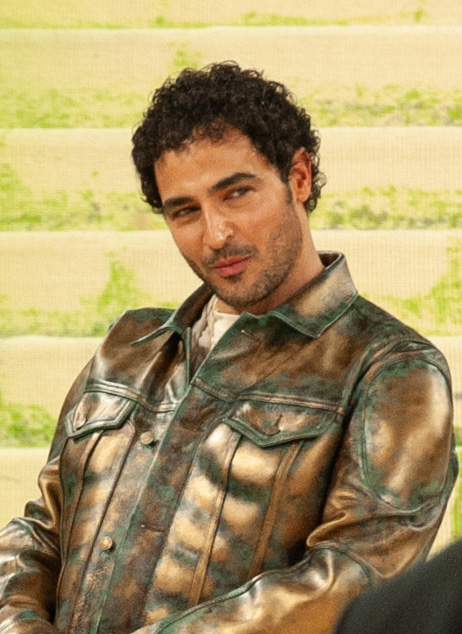
- Posen at the 2026 Met Gala
- Born: Zachary E. Posen; October 24, 1980 (age 45); New York City, U.S.
- Education: Parsons School of Design; Central Saint Martins
- Labels: Zac Posen; Brooks Brothers (2014–2020)
- Awards: CFDA: Swarovski's Perry Ellis Award for Womenswear (2004)

Zachary E. Posen (/zæk ˈpoʊzən/; born October 24, 1980) is an American fashion designer.

== Early life ==
Zachary E. Posen was born and raised in a Jewish family in New York City, residing in the SoHo neighborhood of lower Manhattan. He is the son of Susan (née Orzack), a corporate lawyer, and Stephen Arnold Posen, an artist. He has family roots in Shklow, Belarus, and Żychlin, Poland. His interest in fashion design started early, and as a child he would steal yarmulkes from his grandparents' synagogue to make ball dresses for dolls.

He attended Saint Ann's School, a private school in Brooklyn and in his sophomore year interned with fashion designer Nicole Miller. As a teen, he also won a Scholastic Art and Writing Award. At age 16 he enrolled in the pre-college program at Parsons The New School for Design. He graduated from Saint Ann's in 1999. For three years, Posen was mentored by curator Richard Martin at The Costume Institute of The Metropolitan Museum of Art. At age 18, he was accepted into the womenswear degree program at London's Central Saint Martins College of Art and Design at the University of the Arts London. In 2001, Posen constructed a gown entirely made from thin leather strips and dressmaker hooks and eyes that was displayed by the Victoria and Albert Museum and featured in their "Curvaceous" exhibition.

== Career ==
=== Early beginnings ===
In 2000, Posen received a prominent career opportunity after a dress he made for Naomi Campbell changed hands several times among several fashion insiders, including actress Paz de la Huerta. He is famously well-connected and has called Stella Schnabel his muse. Through Interview magazine Editor-in-Chief Ingrid Sischy, Posen met his future publicist and event producer Ed Filipowski of KCD, who offered to represent him for free.

=== Zac Posen, 2001–2019 ===
Upon returning to New York in 2001, Posen set up an atelier in his parents' living room, while they gave him a US$15 allowance. In October of the same year, he was chosen to present a capsule collection as part of GenArt's Fresh Faces in Fashion New York 2001. He received a grant for $20,000. After his first runway show in 2001, Posen was courted by fashion titans Yves Carcelle, president of LVMH Fashion Group; Sidney Toledano, CEO and director of Christian Dior S.A.; and Domenico De Sole, president and CEO of Gucci Group NV. Following the success of this presentation, Posen established his design studio in Laight Street Tribeca.

Posen has become a favorite of Natalie Portman, Rihanna, Amanda Seyfried, Kate Winslet, Claire Danes, Cameron Diaz, Jennifer Lopez, Mischa Barton, Beyoncé Knowles and others.

In 2004, fashion brand Sean John made an investment deal with Posen. Ashley Olsen interned with Posen in 2005 while she was a student at New York University.

In April 2008, Posen's capsule collection created in collaboration with Target, Zac Posen for Target, was released in 75 stores in Australia. A preview of the collection was shown during March's L'Oreal Melbourne Fashion Festival.

At the 2012 Academy Awards, Glenn Close wore a Posen gown on the red carpet, as did both Reese Witherspoon and Naomi Watts at the 2013 Golden Globe Awards. Other notables who have worn Posen creations on red carpets include Uma Thurman at the 2013 Met Ball); Sofia Vergara at the 2014 Golden Globes; Anna Chlumsky at the 2014 Emmy Awards; and Rita Ora at the 2014 AMA Awards.

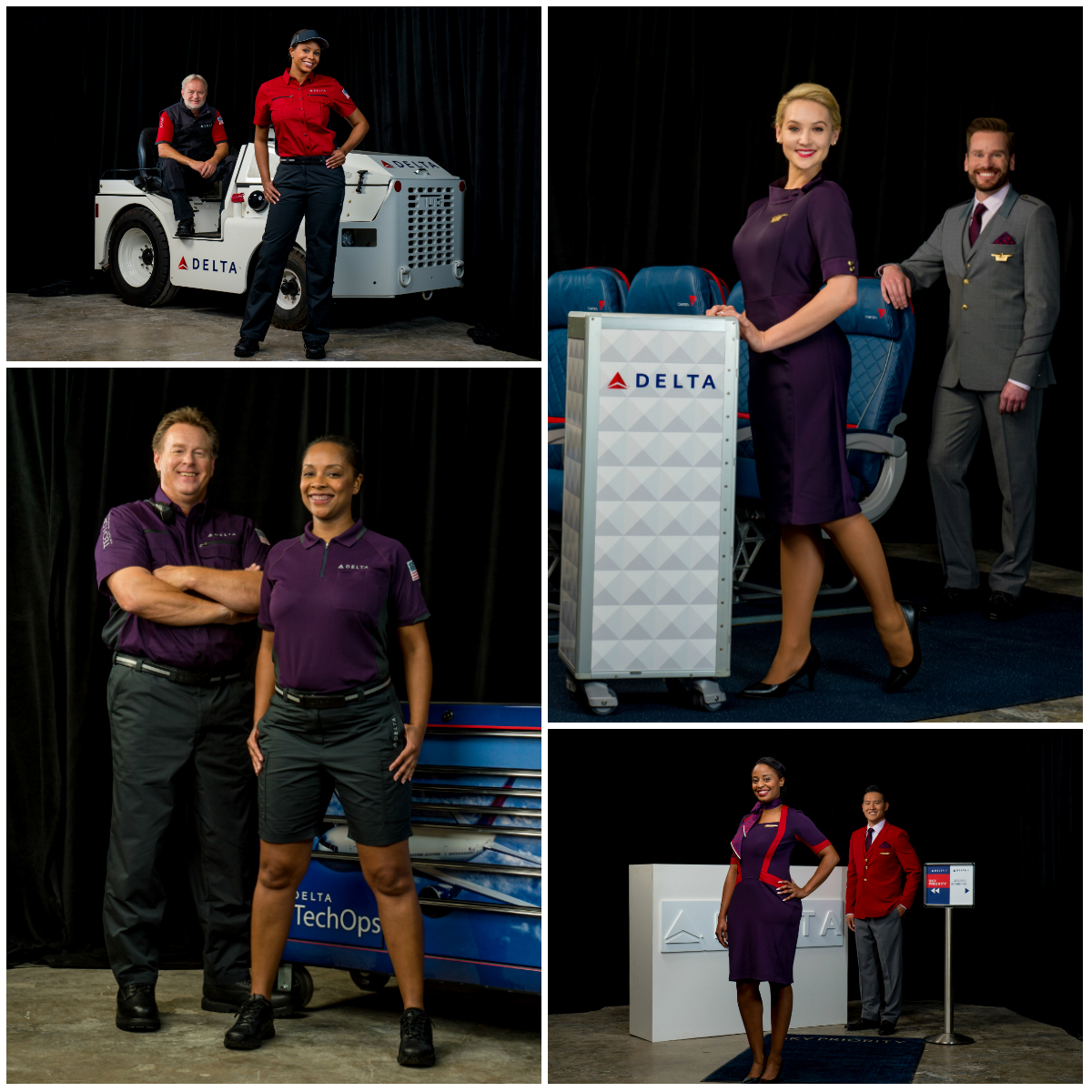
In October 2016, Delta Air Lines unveiled new uniforms for their employees, which were designed by Posen.

In February 2014, Posen partnered with another major retailer, David's Bridal, to create Truly Zac Posen, a line of affordable bridal gowns. The line was Posen's first official bridal collection.

In 2014, he introduced a more casual Pre-Fall 2015 Trunk Show collection.

In 2018, Posen was selected to redesign the uniforms for Delta Air Lines 60,000 employees. But just two years later, the airline jettisoned Posen's Purple Passport line after numerous flight attendants claimed the fabric was causing skin rashes and other allergic reactions.

In 2018, Posen designed the blush silk gown Princess Eugenie of York wore for her evening wedding reception.

On November 1, 2019, House of Z and Z Spoke, the fashion brand owners of Posen's company, announced an immediate closure of the label. The closure occurred soon after it was announced on August 6, 2019, that Barneys New York, a major client of Posen's company, had filed for bankruptcy. Shortly after, Centric Brands reportedly acquired the Zac Posen trademark at auction. In May 2020, Centric Brands filed for Chapter 11 bankruptcy protection due to the effects of the COVID-19 pandemic.

=== Brooks Brothers, 2014–2020 ===
In 2014, Posen was named Creative Director for Brooks Brothers, tapped to modernize their signature women's clothing and accessories line. He renewed his contract with Brooks Brothers in 2017.

=== Gap, 2024–present ===
In February 2024, Posen was hired as the creative director of Gap and chief creative officer of Old Navy as part of a strategy to revitalize the brands. Posen is the first executive-level creative lead for Gap inc since the 2011 departure of Patrick Robinson.

== Other activities ==
On December 18, 2012, Posen was announced as an official judge on Project Runway starting with season 11, staying on until after season 16. On September 7, 2018, it was announced that Posen would not be returning to Project Runway for a 17th season on Bravo.

In October 2017, Posen's 288-page cookbook was published by Rodale. It is described as having "100 recipes every bit as decadent and inspiring as his designs."

In 2021, Posen released a collection of genderless wedding rings.

== Recognition ==
Posen's awards include the Council of Fashion Designers of America's 2004 Swarovski's Perry Ellis Award for Womenswear.

== Personal life ==
Posen is openly gay. In 2023, he became engaged to Harrison Ball, a principal dancer at the New York City Ballet.

== See also ==
- LGBT culture in New York City
- List of LGBT people from New York City
- NYC Pride March
