= Laura Bennett =

American architect and fashion designer

- Born: August 2, 1963 (age 63)
- Education: University of Houston; Columbia University
- Occupation: Fashion designer
- Television: Project Runway Season 3 (3rd)
- Spouse: Peter L. Shelton (m. 1995; died 2012)

Laura Eugenia Bennett (born August 2, 1963), also named Laura Bennett Shelton, is an American architect and fashion designer. She was one of the four finalists for the third season of a competitive reality television series Project Runway, which originally aired on Bravo network.

== Early life and education ==
Bennett was raised in Metairie, Louisiana; there, she graduated from Ecole Classique High School. She then attended a few semesters of Tulane University, traveled around Europe, and moved with her parents to Houston, Texas. She then earned her bachelor's degree from the University of Houston and a degree from a graduate program of Columbia University—both degrees in architecture.

Bennett had sewn her own clothes since her early life and aspired to switch her career from architecture to fashion. However, she had not gone to a fashion school but grown interested in fashion when she watched Project Runway.

Bennett's grandmother Gene Bennett was a Louisiana painter.

== Project Runway season 3 (2006) ==
=== Pre-season ===
Bennett, a 42-year-old New York City architect and mother of five, first competed in the third season of Project Runway, despite her lack of formal training in fashion. When the series debuted in 2004, she envisioned herself appearing in the first season (2004–05) of the series. Her audition for the third season occurred at a Macy's store. Three days before the season premiere, the Fort Worth Star-Telegram previewed Bennett as "whimsically arrogant". When the season premiered, she was the oldest female contestant of the whole cast.

=== Early period of the season ===
Bennett's physical appearance was described by Jen Chung of Gothamist as resemblance to actress Kate Walsh (Grey's Anatomy) and by Kara G. Morrison of The Detroit News as that to actress Marcia Cross. Morrison further wrote that Bennett "dresses like Carolina Herrera." Amy DiLuna of the New York Daily News noted Bennett also wearing fur while brushing her teeth and never shown wearing casual wear. As Morrison noted, Bennett would sew "cocktail dresses" rather than "jeans or T-shirts".

One of the series's judges Michael Kors praised Bennett's "classy fur-trimmed and bejeweled coat"—wrote Kara A. Medalis of The Stamford Advocate—made of "a white furry throw rug and a cheap glass chandelier"—wrote Sue Hutchinson of The Mercury News—designed for the season's first challenge. She also became an early favorite of DiLuna, who named her a "contender to the crown"; (Note: Amy DiLuna named also Robert Best and Malan Breton "contender[s] to the crown". She named Keith Michael also a "contender to the crown" and the "1st Winner" before his disqualification later in the third season.) and of Medalis.

In the fourth episode, the winning team of the episode's challenge consisted of Bennett, Mychael Knight, and the team captain Angela Kesslar. In effort to help the team win, Bennett and Knight collaborated by restraining "Keslar's artsy-craftsy tendencies and even find[ing] ways to make her Rococo-style rosettes look tasteful." USA Today named Bennett and Knight's collaboration one of "best decisions" of the reality television week ending August 7, 2006. By then, columnist Dave Walker of The Times-Picayune named Bennett "one of its most colorful, and competent, ever" of the first three seasons of the series.

=== Later period of the season ===
Bennett became one of the final four after the "black-and-white cocktail dress challenge" in the tenth episode. (Note: Kayne Gillaspie and the two reinstated contestants Vincent Libretti and Angela Keslar were eliminated in the tenth episode of the third season.) Rather than eliminate a contestant as previously done in prior seasons, all remaining four, including Bennett, then became finalists after the final pre-Fashion Week challenge of the season. She, like each of other finalists, received an $8,000 budget for her own collection.

For the Fashion Week, Bennett's collection contained "luxurious evening wear heavy on lace and sleek silhouettes," "a long-sleeved black lace dress" containing a "black feather trim from the waist to the short hemline", and "a shiny gray gown [with] a yellow velvet belt," wrote the Associated Press. As noted by the Fashion Wire Daily, the collection included also "[y]outhful details like ostrich feathers and jewel toned accents", contrary to her tasteful "overly mature and conservative designs" she had done throughout the season. Before the Fashion Week, Kim Crow of The Plain Dealer previewed Bennett's collection as "the strongest, most commercially viable" per "[w]ord on the street". (Note: Kim Crow previewed Uli Herzner's Fashion Week collection as also "the strongest, most commercially viable" per "[w]ord on the street".) When the Fashion Week arrived, Kara G. Morrison of The Detroit News noted Bennett's collection using "mostly nude and black hues".

In the penultimate episode of the season, Part One of the Finale, Bennett accused another finalist Jeffrey Sebelia of receiving help from external sources in order to sew his collection. She cited Sebelia's mother, who befriended and then spread the rumor to Bennett's mother, who then spread this to her daughter. In the season finale, Part Two of the Finale, the producers did not find proof to support her claim, so they cleared Sebelia from any wrongdoing. (Note: However, Jeffrey Sebelia self-proved to have exceeded the budget allowed, so he forewent the wigs off the collection before the finale runway show.) Tara Merrin of The Calgary Sun named the accusation scene one of "best scandal" moments on reality television of 2006.

At the Fashion Week, the judges found Bennett's collection "exquisitely crafted [...] but too limited." She became the second runner-up to crowned winner Sebelia. (Note: At the end of the third season, Uli Herzner became the first runner-up; Mychael Knight, third runner-up.)

=== Reception as a finalist ===
At time of original airing in 2006, before the final four became officially finalists, Jill Radsken of the Boston Herald named Bennett and Uli Herzner "both letdowns", noting Bennett appearing "exhausted, and her collection reflected low energy." Michelle Greppi of the TelevisionWeek magazine thought that Bennett or Uli Herzner should have won instead of Sebelia. Greppi further predicted that Herzner's and Bennett's collections "would sell out at high-end department stores throughout the country". (Note: Michelle Greppi called Jeffrey Sebelia's win a "bummerest [sic]" moment of the week ending October 23, 2006, and predicted that his collection "would appeal to only one out of 10 women.") Kara G. Morrison of The Detroit News praised Bennett's collection as "dazzling" and "elegant and youthful". The Orlando Sentinel columnist Liz Langley noted Bennett "nearly" maintaining "her poise" throughout the season, despite her pregnancy or pressure, and appearing "like a countess but work[ing] like an ant". Ramin Setoodeh of Newsweek in February 2008 found Bennett "robbed of the Runway crown".

== Post-Project Runway activities ==
Bennett's design, based on a Peanuts character Pig-Pen, was modeled for the very first "MetLife Snoopy in Fashion" runway show in the New York Fashion Week of September 2007. Throughout the following month, October 2007, the dress was auctioned off via eBay for charity alongside other Peanuts-inspired clothes done by other designers, including Isaac Mizrahi, Betsey Johnson, and Kristin Chenoweth. The starting bid for each dress was US$9.99. Sales of the dresses, including Bennett's, were donated to the Dress for Success organization.

From February 6, 2008, Bennett appeared in six QVC programs selling womenswear, including an under-$150 satin trench coat, a $60 skirt, a $65 blouse, and a $70 pants. She also served as a guest judge in an episode of the fifth season of Project Runway. She also was an MSNBC fashion commentator; wrote a book Didn't I Feed You Yesterday? in 2009 about motherhood, which was published by Ballantine Books on April 6, 2010, the following year; and wrote a blog for The Daily Beast. She wrote her second book Handmade Chic about fashion design, which was released in 2012.

== Personal life ==
Bennett has a daughter from her previous marriage and four sons with the late architect Peter L. Shelton, whom she married in 1995 or 1996 when Shelton was aged fifty at the time and whose New York City design firm she worked part-time for. She also had crafted jewelry by mid-2000s. She had remained married to Shelton until his cancer-related death in his Manhattan home on August 26, 2012.

The daughter attended a Houston university. When the third season of Project Runway was filmed, Bennett's pregnancy with her and Shelton's fifth son, i.e. her overall sixth child, reached its third month. The sixth child was born in Manhattan on December 1, 2006, and named Finn.

Bennett's son Pierson Shelton modeled one of her designs for a fashion show held by the Child magazine on February 2–9, 2007.

== Bibliography ==
- Didn't I Feed You Yesterday? A Mother's Guide to Sanity in Stilettos, 2010, New York City: Ballantine Books, ISBN 978-0-34551-637-4, LCCN 2009-51632
- Handmade Chic: Fashionable Projects That Look High-End, Not Homespun, 2012, New York City: Rodale Books, ISBN 978-1-60961-300-6, LCCN 2011-30332
