= Uli Herzner =

German fashion designer

- Born: 23 April 1971 (age 55)
- Occupation: fashion designer
- Television: Project Runway season 3 (2nd); Project Runway All Stars season 2 (2nd)
- Website: uliherzner.com

Ulrike "Uli" Herzner is a contestant of reality television series Project Runway.

== Project Runway season 3 (2006) ==
Herzner, a 35-year-old physical therapist and stylist at the time from Miami Beach, Florida, first competed in the third season of the series. She originated from East Germany, whose "communist-era fashion" had been insipid. Rather she used "colorful fabrics in bold prints" for her fashion works, especially throughout the season.

Herzner won the season's third challenge, designed outfits for a selected dog and a person carrying it. Jen Chung of Gothamist praised other contender Alison Kelly's high-rated outfits more and wrote that Alison "was robbed!" In the fourth challenge, she was part of a bottom-rated three-person team, led by Bonnie Dominguez, who was eliminated after the challenge.

Jen Chung of Gothamist praised Herzner's dress made for the mother of Kayne Gillaspie in the seventh challenge and wrote that Uli "was robbed", i.e. more deserving than Vincent Libretti, who "won [the challenge] for his boring black dress for Uli's mom." The USA Today picked the following as the "best decision[s]" of the weeks: judges' criticism in the eighth episode toward Uli's repetitive uses of "the same printed sundress over and over"; Uli's choice of "a pearl-gray charmeuse fabric" in the subsequent ninth episode in response to the judges' feedback, despite not winning the challenge.

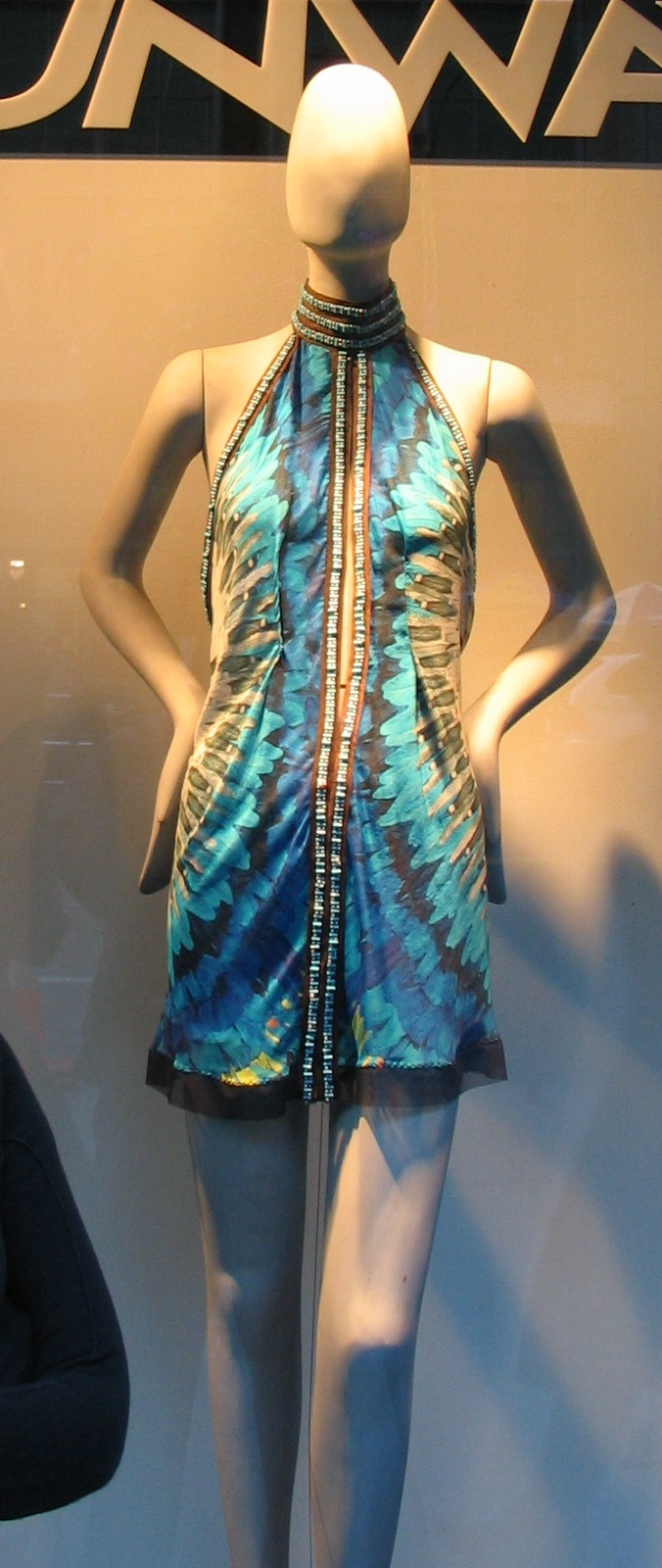
Uli's winning halter mini

Before officially becoming a finalist, Jill Radsken of Boston Herald named Herzner and Laura Bennett "both letdowns", noting Herzner's "monotonous animal-print dresses". On the week when she became one of four finalists, Herzner, despite being a "weak link", won the final regular challenge for her "adorable halter mini", wrote Michele Parente of The San Diego Union-Tribune.

In contrast to her prior works shown throughout the season, Herzner designed her own Fashion Week "muted" collection using "brown, beige and silver metallic fabrics with few prints." She eventually finished the first runner-up to eventual winner Jeffrey Sebelia, whose range of collection the judges found "more impressive." In November 2006, Liz Langley of The Orlando Sentinel in her column found Herzner "totally robbed" from the season win and the judges' decision "arbitrary". As Langley further noted, "[T]he best designs often didn't win", and runners-up like Clay Aiken "often supersede" competitive reality television winners. Rebecca Tamel of Examiner.com called Herzner one of "[t]oken one-note[s]" alongside Rami Kashou of season four and even one of Tamel's "favorites personality-wise", Jordana of season six.

== Project Runway All-Star Challenge (2009) ==
Herzner was one of eight Project Runway returnees re-competing on the two-hour Project Runway All-Star Challenge special, which aired on August 20, 2009, on Lifetime network, the same day when the sixth season of Project Runway premiered. She was given a $1,200-budget and designed first three pieces for the red carpet collection intended for the red carpet premiere of a then-upcoming 2009 film Nine starring Nicole Kidman, Penelope Cruz, Marion Cotillard, and Kate Hudson. Then, to complete it, the fourth one made from materials of a restaurant that the returnees dined in. Herzner was one of four lowest-scored returnees of the special, resulting in her elimination before the other four highest-scored returnees ("the final four"). (Note: The first runner-up Daniel Vosovic from the second season also competed in the All-Star Challenge special. Vosovic was crowned the winner, earning him $100,000. The other two from the third season—winner Jeffrey Sebelia and third runner-up Mychael Knight also re-competed and were among the four lowest-scored, resulting in their eliminations before the top four.)

Kelly Lynne praised Herzner's improvement from her original season and Herzner's "structured mini dress with interesting ruffled pleats along the bodice" and "restaurant dress" out of her thirteen-piece All-Star collection, which the judges criticized as "too toned down" and whose "color palette" the judges also panned. (Note: Kelly Lynne (now Tinsley) also worked for The Ann Arbor News.) Out of 2,029 users taking survey, Herzner received 18% votes of the "Who Should Have Won the Project Runway All-Stars?" poll. (Note: The first runner-up Korto Momolu of the fifth season received 56% of the votes.) Ji Hyun Lee of Examiner.com called Herzner's collection—pink dresses "and nudes with ruffled trims" resembling designs of Alexander McQueen—"[t]he stand out".

== Project Runway All Stars season 2 (2012–13) ==
Herzner re-competed for the second season (2012–13) of Project Runway All Stars. She became a finalist and then finished third, i.e. second runner-up, with her collection "Mystical Winter", consisting of "whites, off-whites, and greys."

== Other post-Project Runway activities ==
Herzner designed her clothing works sold exclusively via HSN program Scoop Style in mid-May 2007. By late September 2007, she had not operated a traditional physical store but still had designed and sold her own clothes via her eponymous official website. She later hosted her eponymous program on Plum TV, It's Very Uli.
