= Laura Shelton =

Laura Shelton may refer to:

- Laura Shelton (actress), also wife of filmmaker Carl Monson
- Laura Bennett Shelton, fashion designer, architect, and contestant of Project Runway season three
