= Project Runway season 3 =

Project Runway
- Season 3
- Region 1 DVD cover
- No. of tasks: 13
- No. of contestants: 15
- Winner: Jeffrey Sebelia
- No. of episodes: 15

Release
- Original network: Bravo
- Original release: July 12 – October 18, 2006

Season chronology
- ← Previous; Season 2 Next → Season 4

The third season of Project Runway, Bravo's reality competition for fashion designers premiered on July 12, 2006. This broke tradition from the previous two seasons, which premiered in December, with the finales taking place at Olympus Fashion Week in February.

Season 3 brought in a new set of sponsors, notably Macy's replacing Banana Republic. NBC re-aired the first two episodes of Project Runway 3 five days after their original Bravo airings. The third season also introduced live viewer poll questions. During the second half-hour of the first airing of each episode, Bravo posed a question to viewers pertaining to the current episode. Fans had the option to respond via text message or the BravoTV.com website.

The winner, Jeffrey Sebelia, received a spread in Elle magazine, a mentorship with INC (Inter-National Concepts) Design, a year of representation by Designers Management Agency, a 2007 Saturn Sky, and $100,000 to start a clothing line (furnished by TRESemmé haircare).

In 2012, Kayne Gillaspie and Uli Herzner later competed in the second season of the All Stars edition with Kayne placing 9th, and Uli placing 3rd. In 2013, Mychael Knight and Jeffrey Sebelia competed in the third season of the All Stars edition, with Mychael placing 8th and Jeffrey placing 7th. In 2023, Kayne Gillaspie competed on Project Runway season 20 placing 10th out of 14.

== Contestants ==
Heidi Klum and contestants of the third season

Contestant	Age	Hometown	Finish	Outcome
Stacey Estrella	40	San Francisco, CA	Episode 1	15th place
Malan Breton	32	Long Island City, NY	Episode 2	14th place
Katherine Gerdes	23	Minneapolis, MN	Episode 3	13th place
Keith Michael	34	New York, NY	Episode 4	Disqualified
Bonnie Dominguez	31	San Diego, CA	Episode 4	11th place
Bradley Baumkirchner	32	Los Angeles	Episode 5	10th place
Alison Kelly	25	Brooklyn, NY	Episode 6	9th place
Robert Best	36	West Hollywood, CA	Episode 7	8th place
Angela Keslar	33	Amesville, OH	Episode 10	6th place
Vincent Libretti	49	Santa Monica, CA	Episode 10	6th place
Kayne Gillaspie	27	Norman, OK	Episode 10	5th place
Mychael Knight †	28	Atlanta, GA	Episode 14	4th place
Laura Bennett	42	New York, NY	Episode 14	3rd place
Uli Herzner	35	Miami Beach, FL	Episode 14	Runner-up
Jeffrey Sebelia	36	Los Angeles	Episode 14	Winner

- (ages listed are the designers' ages at the time the show was taped in the spring of 2006.)

=== Models ===
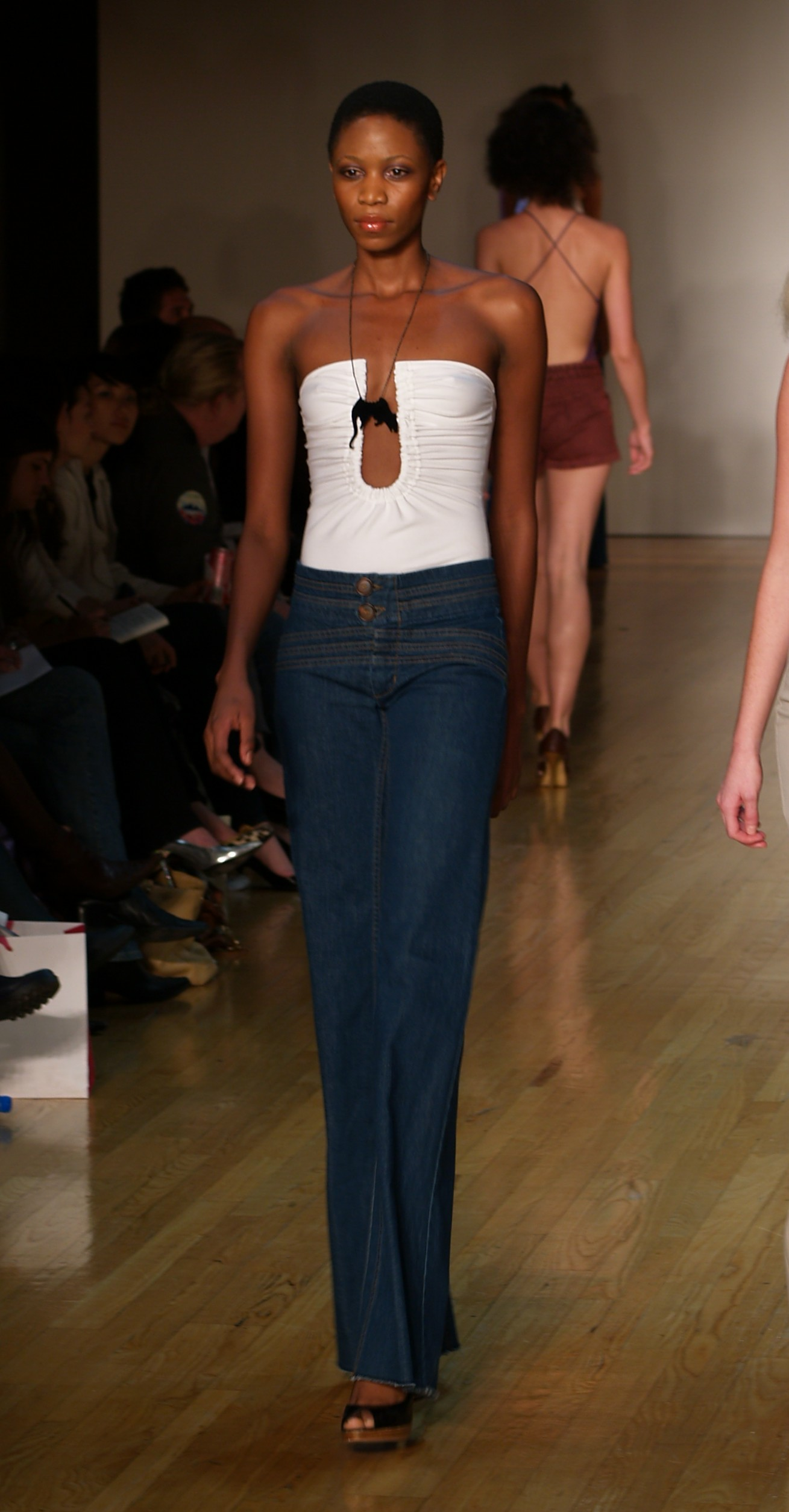
Camilla Barungi modeling for Grey Ant, September 2006

The 15 models competing for an Elle spread in the third season were:

Model	Outcome
Candace Pritchard	15th place
Moon Yung	14th place
Toni Heath	13th place
Katia Biassou	12th place
Katie Champion	11th place
Danielle Schriffen	10th place
Alexandra Donhoeffner	9th place
Jia Santos	8th place
Javi Hairston	7th place
Amanda Fields	6th place
Lindsay Bien Aime	5th place
Clarissa Anderson	4th place
Camilla Barungi	3rd place
Nazri Segaro	Runner-up
Marilinda Rivera	Winner

== Challenges ==
Designer Elimination Chart
Designers	1	2	3	4^{1}	5	6	7	8	9	10^{2}	11^{3}	14	Eliminated Episode
Jeffrey	LOW	IN	IN	HIGH	IN	HIGH	LOW	WIN	WIN	LOW	LOW	WINNER	14 - Finale, Part 2
Uli	IN	HIGH	WIN	LOW	IN	IN	HIGH	LOW	HIGH	LOW	WIN	RUNNER-UP	14 - Finale, Part 2
Laura	HIGH	IN	IN	HIGH	IN	HIGH	LOW	HIGH	LOW	WIN	LOW	3RD PLACE	14 - Finale, Part 2
Mychael	IN	IN	IN	HIGH	WIN	WIN	HIGH	HIGH	LOW	HIGH	LOW	4TH PLACE	14 - Finale, Part 2
Kayne	IN	WIN	IN	LOW	HIGH	LOW	LOW	LOW	LOW	OUT			10 - Black and White
Vincent	LOW	LOW	IN	LOW	LOW	LOW	WIN	LOW	OUT	OUT			9 - Couture du Jour / 10 - Black and White
Angela	IN	LOW	LOW	WIN	HIGH	IN	LOW	OUT		OUT			8 - High Flying Fashion / 10 - Black and White
Robert	HIGH	HIGH	IN	LOW	LOW	IN	OUT						7 - Everyday Woman
Alison	IN	IN	HIGH	HIGH	IN	OUT							6 - Waste Not, Want Not
Bradley	IN	IN	HIGH	LOW	OUT								5 - Iconic Statement
Bonnie	IN	HIGH	IN	OUT									4 - Reap What You Sew
Keith	WIN	IN	LOW	DQ^{1}									4 - Reap What You Sew
Katherine	IN	LOW	OUT										3 - Designer's Best Friend
Malan	IN	OUT											2 - Fit for a Queen
Stacey	OUT												1 - Wall to Wall Fashion

The designer won Project Runway Season 3.
The designer won the challenge.
The designer came in second for that challenge, but did not win.
The designer had one of the highest scores for that challenge, but did not win.
The designer had one of the lowest scores for that challenge, but was not eliminated.
The designer was in the bottom two, but was not eliminated.
The designer lost and was out of the competition.
The designer was disqualified from the competition.
The designer returned to competition and was eliminated for a second time.

- ^Note 1: Keith was disqualified due to having fashion pattern books and leaving production for several hours to gain access with the Internet.
- ^Note 2: Designers previously eliminated who won a challenge were brought back to compete in this challenge.
- ^Note 3: No contestants were eliminated, and all went on to compete at Fashion Week.

=== Model competition ===
Model Elimination Chart
Model	1	2	3	4	5	6	7	8	9	10	11	Finale
Marilinda	SE	BD	BD	BD	JS	JS	JS	JS	JS	JS	JS	WINNER
Nazri	KM	KM	KM	UH	MK	MK	MK	MK	MK	MK	UH	OUT
Camilla	BB	AN	AN	KM	LB	LB	LB	LB	LB	LB	LB	OUT
Clarissa	AN	BB	BB	AN	AN	AN	AN	AN	-	AN	MK	OUT
Lindsay	VL	UH	UH	BB	UH	UH	UH	UH	UH	UH	OUT	
Amanda	AL	KG	KG	KY	KY	KY	KY	KY	KY	KY	OUT	
Javi	JS	JS	JS	JS	OUT					VL	OUT	
Jia	KY	VL	VL	VL	VL	VL	VL	VL	VL	WD		
Alexandra	MK	MK	MK	AL	AL	AL	-	OUT				
Danielle	RB	RB	RB	RB	RB	RB	RB	OUT				
Katie	LB	LB	LB	LB	BB	OUT						
Katia	UH	KY	KY	MK	OUT							
Toni	BD	AL	AL	OUT								
Moon	MB	MB	OUT									
Candace	KG	OUT										

The model won Project Runway Season 3.
The model wore the winning design that challenge.
The model wore the losing design that challenge.
The model was eliminated.
The model was eliminated, but was brought back.
The model withdrew from the competition.

Designer legend

- Alison Kelly: AL
- Angela Keslar: AN
- Bonnie Dominguez: BD
- Bradley Baumkirchner: BB
- Jeffrey Sebelia: JS
- Katherine Gerdes: KG
- Kayne Gillaspie: KY
- Keith Michael: KM
- Laura Bennett: LB
- Malan Breton: MB
- Michael Knight: MK
- Robert Best: RB
- Stacey Estrella: SE
- Uli Herzner: UH
- Vincent Libretti: VL

Model selection process:

- Episode 1: Models were randomly assigned to designers.
- Episodes 2 and 4: Designers chose their models, with the winner of the previous challenge choosing first and the other designers choosing in random order.
- Episode 3 and 6: The winner of the previous challenge was allowed to change his model. All other designers kept their previous model.
- Episode 5: Models were chosen in random order and picked their designers. Two models were eliminated in this episode to match the elimination of one designer and the disqualification of another in the previous episode.
- Episode 7: Models are the designers' mothers and sisters; designers could not choose their own family member.
- Episode 8: Designers chose their models, with the winner of the previous challenge choosing first and the other designers choosing in random order. Two models were eliminated because no models were used in the previous episode.
- Episode 9: New models were randomly assigned in Paris.
- Episode 10: Vincent and Angela were brought back, as were their models. Vincent's model Jia was involved in a bicycle accident and was not able to walk down the runway. Javi, a previously eliminated model, took her place. Jia was out for the rest of the competition while she recovered. All other designers used their models chosen in Episode 8.
- Episode 11: Designers chose their models from the remaining seven, with the winner of the previous challenge choosing first and the other designers choosing in random order. Because three designers were eliminated in the previous challenge, three models were eliminated for this challenge.
- Finale: Two previously eliminated models, Amanda and Alexandra, were used in two of the final designers' collections. Amanda was used in Uli's final collection, and Alexandra was used in Michael's final collection.

== Episodes ==
=== Episode 0: Road to Runway Season 3 ===
Tim Gunn and a panel of fashion professionals, which include previous Project Runway designers, interview thousands of possible contestants for the third season of Project Runway. Previous winners and contestants are profiled since the airing of previous seasons.

- One hour casting special before the Season 3 premiere.
- First aired July 20, 2006

Simone LeBlanc; Steven Rosengard and Jillian Lewis (from Season 4); Daniel Feld (from Season 5); and Gordana Gehlhausen (from Season 6) were semi-finalists for Season 3.

In the beginning of this episode, Gehlhausen can be seen briefly during the Los Angeles casting call, saying "literally if you give me a sheep, I'll give you a sweater".

Season 7 winner Seth Aaron Henderson, even though not a semi-finalist for the 3rd season, can be seen while Tim critiques his designs as "student work".

=== Episode 1: Wall to Wall Fashion ===
The designers arrive in New York and are asked to create an outfit in just two days using only materials found in their apartments. All items found in the apartment must fit into a large bag and the designer who touches the object first gets it. This challenge requires the designers to create garments that innovate and best reflect who they are as a fashion designer. All of the designers are randomly assigned models. The winner has immunity for the next challenge and cannot be eliminated.

- Judges: Heidi Klum, Nina Garcia, Michael Kors
- Guest Judge: fashion designer Kate Spade.
- WINNER: Keith
- OUT: Stacey
- First aired July 12, 2006

=== Episode 2: Fit for a Queen ===
The remaining designers are asked to create a formal evening gown for guest judge and 2006 Miss USA Tara Conner in just two days and $300. The winning dress will be worn in competition by Tara in the Miss Universe 2006 pageant. This challenge requires the designers to be placed in teams of two with Tara Conner choosing seven team leaders. All of the designers are allowed to swap models. The winner has immunity for the next challenge and cannot be eliminated.

Team Leader	Other Team Member
Uli	Bonnie
Jeffrey	Alison
Kayne	Robert
Laura	Michael
Vincent	Angela
Malan	Katherine
Keith	Bradley

- Judges: Heidi Klum, Nina Garcia
- Guest Judge: Vera Wang (sitting in for Michael Kors), Tara Conner, Miss USA 2006
- WINNER: Kayne (teamed with Robert Best)
- OUT: Malan (teamed with Katherine Gerdes)
- First aired July 19, 2006

=== Episode 3: Designer's Best Friend ===
The remaining designers are asked to create an outfit and story for a dog and its owner in just two days and US$150. The winner has immunity for the next challenge and cannot be eliminated.

- Judges: Heidi Klum, Nina Garcia
- Guest Judge: Vera Wang (sitting in for Michael Kors), Ivanka Trump, VP Real Estate Development at Trump Organization.
- WINNER: Uli
- OUT: Katherine
- First aired July 26, 2006

=== Episode 4: Reap What You Sew ===
The remaining designers are asked to create a three-piece outfit for Macy's in-house INC brand in just two days and US$100. All designers are allowed to swap models. Four designers are chosen by guest judge Mehmet Tangoren as team leaders, must work in teams of three, and can choose any model in their team. The winning design will be manufactured, produced, and sold at Macy's largest stores nationwide. The winner does not have immunity for this challenge.

Team Leader	Team Members
Angela	Laura, Michael
Keith	Jeffrey, Alison
Robert	Kayne, Vincent
Bonnie	Uli, Bradley

- Judges: Heidi Klum, Nina Garcia
- Guest Judge: Vera Wang (sitting in for Michael Kors), Mehmet Tangoren, VP of Contemporary Sportswear at Macy's.
- WINNER: Angela (teamed with Laura Bennett and Michael Knight)
- OUT: Bonnie (teamed with Bradley Baumkirchner and Uli Herzner)
- DISQUALIFIED: Keith
- First aired August 2, 2006

==== Designer disqualification ====
Keith Michael Rizza was found to have guides that could potentially be used as outside resources in a closed competition. These guides included fashion "how-to" books including basic pattern making textbooks as well as fashion history books. Keith claimed that although he did have the books in his possession, he never actually used them. Additionally, Keith left production unattended for several hours during promotional filming after a quarrel with the other designers. Keith left to go to his boyfriend's apartment to send an e-mail to Bravo's producer. However, this is also a means for disqualification because he used the internet. Any contact outside the competition is prohibited unless monitored by Bravo production. Any outside documents or materials related to fashion or fashion design are prohibited during competition. Once these claims were brought to the producers' attention, it was decided Keith knowingly broke the rules stated in a signed contract and was asked to leave the show. Keith Michael is the first Project Runway contestant to be disqualified from the series. After his disqualification, Jeffrey Sebelia and Alison Kelly were the only team who lost their leader in this challenge.

=== Episode 5: Iconic Statement ===
The remaining designers are asked to modernize a look for a "fashion icon" in just two days and US$150. The winner of this challenge will feature their look and model in a print advertisement for TRESemmé in Elle magazine. This challenge allowed remaining models to be randomly selected to choose a designer they wanted to work with. Models then chose a portrait that indicated the icon they wanted the designer to modernize. The fashion icons were: Cher, Farrah Fawcett, Pam Grier, Audrey Hepburn, Katharine Hepburn, Madonna, Marilyn Monroe, Jackie Onassis, Diana Ross, and Twiggy. The winner does not have immunity for this challenge.

Designer	Fashion Icon
Bradley	Cher
Alison	Farrah Fawcett
Michael	Pam Grier
Angela	Audrey Hepburn
Laura	Katharine Hepburn
Jeffrey	Madonna
Kayne	Marilyn Monroe
Robert	Jackie Onassis
Uli	Diana Ross
Vincent	Twiggy

- Judges: Heidi Klum, Nina Garcia, Michael Kors
- Guest Judge: fashion designer Diane von Fürstenberg.
- WINNER: Michael (icon: Pam Grier)
- OUT: Bradley (icon: Cher)
- First aired August 9, 2006

=== Episode 6: Waste Not, Want Not ===
The remaining designers are asked to create an outfit in just one day using only materials found at the Waste Management Recycle America Center in Port Newark, New Jersey and US$25 for materials found at an art supplies store. This challenge requires the designers to create garments that innovate and are judged accordingly. The winner has immunity for this challenge.

- Judges: Heidi Klum, Nina Garcia, Michael Kors
- Guest Judge: celebrity fashion stylist Rachel Zoe
- WINNER: Michael
- OUT: Alison
- First aired August 16, 2006
- Michael is the third person to win two challenges in a row behind Daniel V. from season 2, and Kara from season 1.

=== Episode 7: Everyday Woman ===
The remaining designers are asked to create an outfit for an "everyday woman" with just one day and US$150. The remaining designers' mothers and sisters are used as the clients and models for this challenge. Each designer cannot pick their own mother or sister. The winner does not have immunity for this challenge. Most of the episode revolved around Jeffrey and his client, Angela's mother, and the problems that ensued between the two. Jeffrey thought that she was trying to sabotage him, and he also opted to go in a different direction than she asked for after criticizing her taste.

- Judges: Heidi Klum, Nina Garcia, Michael Kors
- Guest Judge: Joan Kors, Michael Kors' mother.
- WINNER: Vincent
- OUT: Robert
- First aired August 23, 2006

=== Episode 8: High Flying Fashion ===
The remaining designers are asked to create and model an "international jet-set" outfit for themselves in just one day and US$75. This challenge requires the designers to create garments that travel well and are tested for wearability as the designers are flown to Paris. There were two runway presentations; one in Paris for Catherine Malandrino judging wearability, and the New York panel. The winner has immunity for this challenge. Angela is the only contestant in all season who was not eliminated by Heidi, but by a guest judge.

- Judges: Heidi Klum, Nina Garcia, Michael Kors
- Guest Judge: Francisco Costa, creative director for Calvin Klein women's collection; and Catherine Malandrino, fashion designer.
- WINNER: Jeffrey
- OUT: Angela
- First aired August 30, 2006

=== Episode 9: Couture du Jour ===
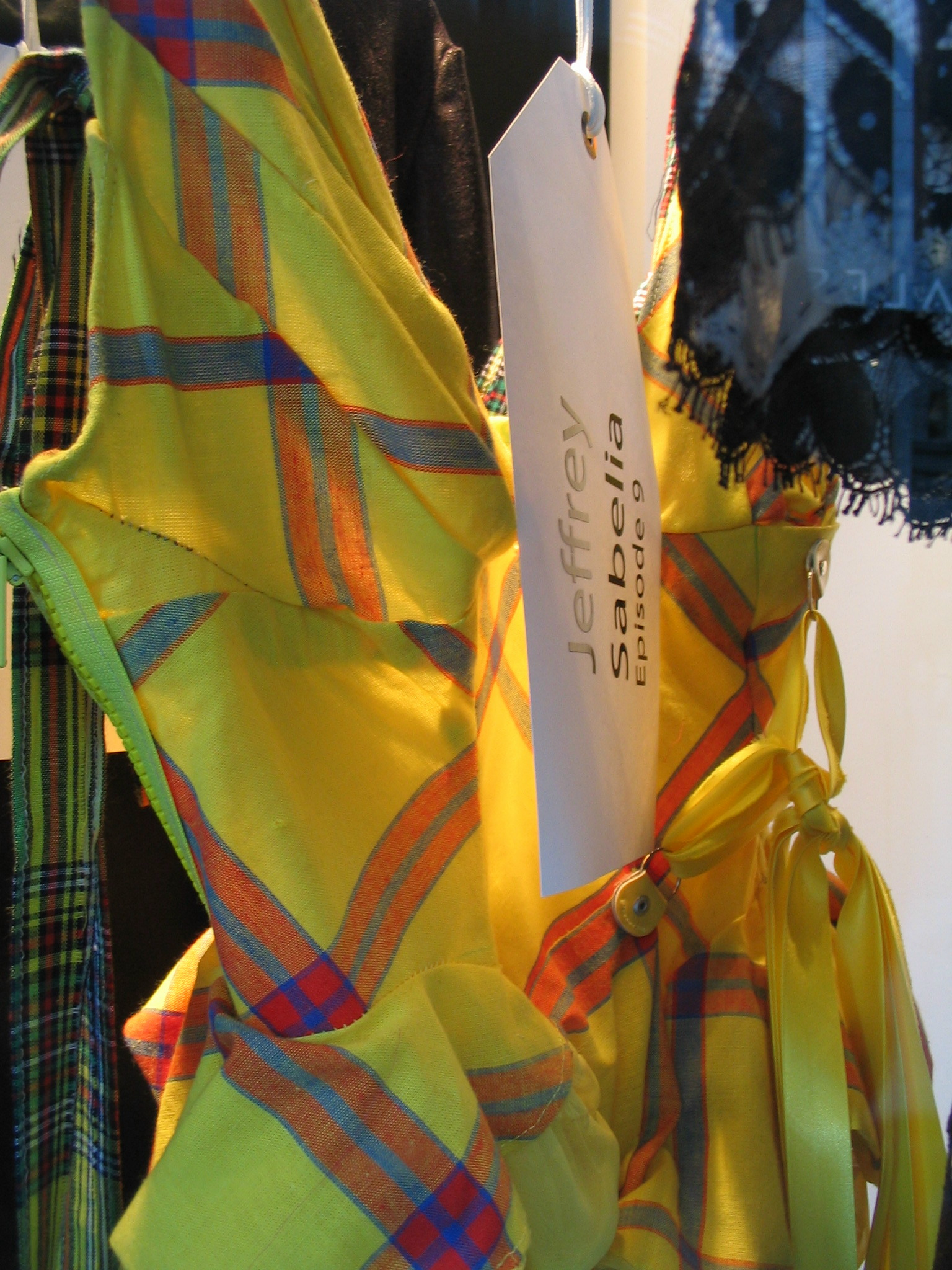
Jeffrey's winning dress

The remaining designers are asked to create an evening gown in just two days and €300 (US$375) employing Haute couture techniques. Designers workroom is held at Parsons Paris. There were two runway presentations: one for guest judge Catherine Malandrino with Parisian models, and the New York panel. The winner does not have immunity for this challenge.

- Judges: Heidi Klum, Nina Garcia, Michael Kors
- Guest Judge: fashion designers Catherine Malandrino and Richard Tyler.
- WINNER: Jeffrey
- OUT: Vincent
- First aired September 6, 2006

=== Episode 10: Black and White ===
The designers are asked to create a cocktail dress using only black and white fabrics with only one day and US$100. An additional challenge requires designers to incorporate all of the fabric purchased into the outfit. Previously eliminated designers who have won at least one previous challenge are allowed back into the competition and are able to stay only if they win this challenge. Previously eliminated designers Angela Keslar and Vincent Libretti are invited back to compete. There was some controversy, especially towards Angela, who had won when teamed with two designers who were still in. Keith won the first challenge, so if not for being disqualified, he could have been eliminated and still played this challenge. Three designers are eliminated. Had one of the two previously eliminated contestants won the challenge, they would have stayed, and two designers who had not previously been eliminated would have left, along with the other who had left. However, while neither Angela nor Vincent had the worst garment, neither won. The winner does not have immunity for this challenge.

- Judges: Heidi Klum, Nina Garcia, Michael Kors
- Guest Judge: fashion designer Zac Posen.
- WINNER: Laura
- OUT: Angela, Vincent and Kayne
- First aired September 13, 2006

=== Episode 11: What the ELLE? ===
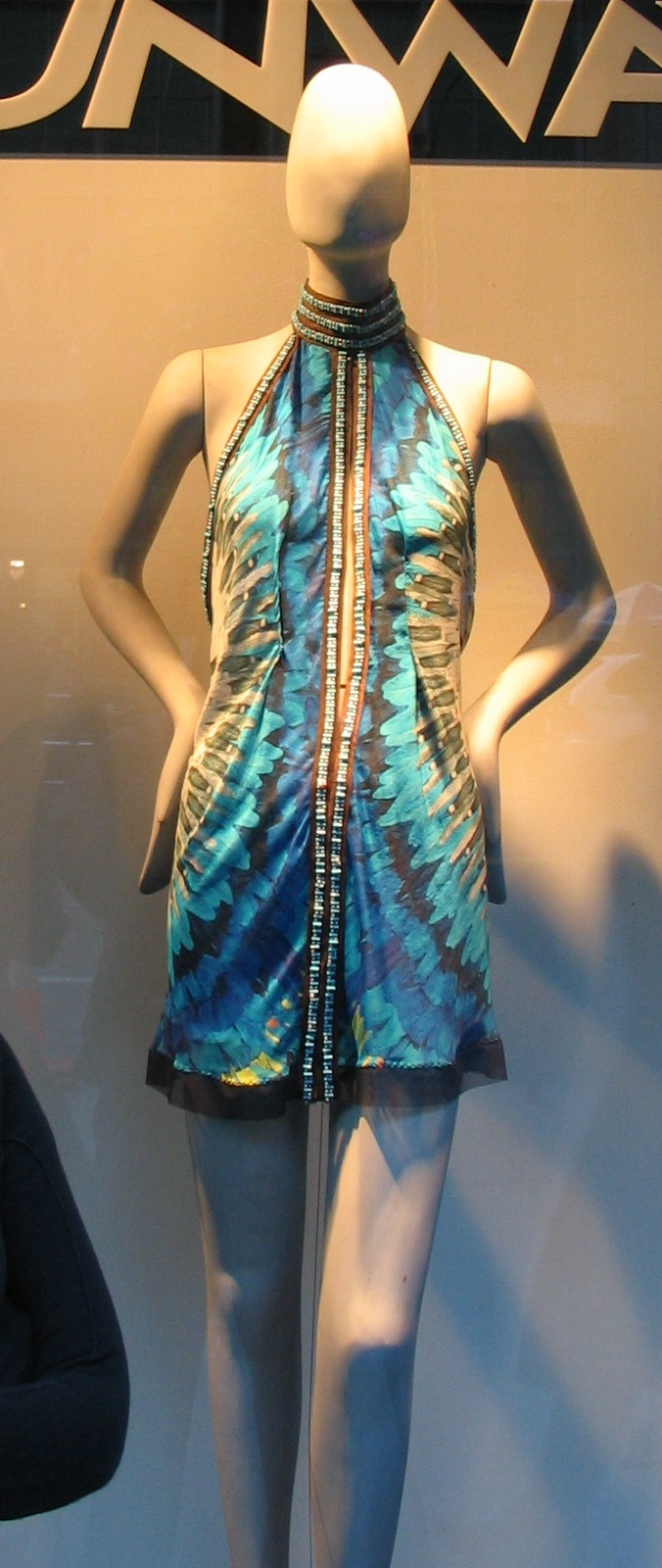
Uli's winning dress

The remaining designers are asked to create an outfit that expresses "their specific point of view as a designer" in just two days and US$250. The winner of this challenge has his or her look and model featured in US Elle magazine's "First Look" page photographed by Gilles Bensimon. All of the designers are allowed to swap models. The designers must create a photo-shoot with their models and find three words that best expresses who they are as designers. The designers are given a one-sheet for their three words and photo to be judged. The chosen designers will show a 12 piece collection during Olympus Spring Fashion Week. This is the final challenge and there is no immunity for this challenge.

- Judges: Heidi Klum; Nina Garcia; Michael Kors
- Guest Judge: Teri Agins, lead fashion writer for The Wall Street Journal.
- WINNER: Uli
- OUT: None: All four designers advanced to Olympus Fashion Week.
- First aired September 27, 2006

=== Episode 12: Reunion ===
- All of the Season 3 designers gathered for a reunion hosted by Tim Gunn and Heidi Klum on the eve of New York Fashion Week, at which the final four designers will display their collections. When confronted about his elimination, Keith insisted not only that the books in question were planted in his room after he had relinquished them to the producers, but that he was absent from the production with permission, thus suggesting he was sabotaged, a charge Tim Gunn dismissed as unlikely. Finalist Michael Knight won $10,000 in the "Bravotv.com Fan Favorite" contest.
- Judges: N/A
- WINNER/OUT: N/A
- First aired October 4, 2006

=== Episode 13: Finale – Part 1 ===
The remaining designers are asked to create a 12-piece fashion collection featured at the Bryant Park tents for Spring 2006 Olympus New York Fashion Week with only two months and $8,000. Tim Gunn travels to visit each of the remaining designers' respective studios to critique each designer's progress. The designers then return to New York with a week remaining to finish their collections in a workroom provided by show sponsor Macy's.

- Judges: N/A
- WINNER/OUT: N/A
- First aired October 11, 2006

=== Episode 14: Finale – Part 2 ===
The remaining designers finish their collections and all of the designers show and are judged in the Bryant Park tents for Spring New York Olympus Fashion Week with no decoy collection. Collections were judged based on execution, innovation, and originality. The winning designer received an editorial spread in Elle magazine, a mentorship with Macy's in-house INC (International Concepts) Design studio, a year of representation by Designers Management Agency (DMA), a 2007 Saturn Sky, and $100,000 stipend to start a clothing line. The winning model is featured and photographed in a fashion spread for US Elle magazine.

- Judges: Heidi Klum, Nina Garcia, Michael Kors
- Guest Judge: Fern Mallis, founder of New York Fashion Week.
- WINNER of Project Runway season 3: Jeffrey Sebelia.
- OUT: Mychael (third runner-up), Laura (second runner-up), Uli (first runner-up)
- Winner of PR3 model competition: Marilinda Rivera.
- First aired October 18, 2006

== Reception ==
At time of original airing in 2006, Michelle Greppi of the TelevisionWeek magazine thought that Uli Herzner or Laura Bennett should have won instead of Jeffrey Sebelia, whose win Greppi wrote as "bummerest [sic]". Greppi further predicted that Herzner's and Bennett's collections "would sell out at high-end department stores throughout the country," while Sebelia's "would appeal to only one out of 10 women." She further wrote that Sebelia should have been eliminated rather than become a finalist for especially for "the botched bowling-shirt of a dress" made "cruelly" for the mother of contestant Angela Keslar "during the 'average woman' challenge."

In 2011, Vicky Hyman of The Star-Ledger noted "four very different but equally appealing aesthetics—the sophisticated glam of Laura Bennett, the beachy vibe of Uli Herzner, the urban chic of Michael Knight, and the rocker cool of Jeffrey Sebelia," the winner whom Hyman "despised" throughout the season. Hyman did not contest Sebelia's win but declared her "soft spot for Uli's flowy prints."
