= Project Runway season 6 =

Project Runway
- Season 6
- Region 1 DVD cover
- No. of tasks: 13
- No. of contestants: 16
- Winner: Irina Shabayeva
- No. of episodes: 14

Release
- Original network: Lifetime
- Original release: August 20 – November 19, 2009

Season chronology
- ← Previous; Season 5 Next → Season 7

The sixth season of Project Runway premiered on Lifetime on August 20, 2009, the first season to be aired on that network. The production of this season started in September 2008 and finished the pre-finale filming on October 17, 2008. It is the only season of Project Runway to be filmed at the Fashion Institute of Design and Merchandising in Los Angeles.

Returning as judges are supermodel Heidi Klum, fashion designer Michael Kors, and Marie Claire fashion director Nina Garcia. Tim Gunn returned as a mentor to the aspiring designers. This is the second season which consisted of all female finalists.

The winner of this season of Project Runway, Irina Shabayeva, received an editorial feature in an issue of Marie Claire magazine, a cash prize of $100,000 to start her own line, and an all-expenses-paid trip for two to Paris. Furthermore, the winning model of this season, Kalyn Hemphill, received a $25,000 cash prize from L'Oreal and took part in the winning designer's fashion spread in Marie Claire.

The premiere was preceded by a two-hour special episode of Project Runway: "All-Star Challenge", featuring eight past contestants (Daniel Vosovic, Santino Rice, Jeffrey Sebelia, Uli Herzner, Mychael Knight, Chris March, Sweet P, and Korto Momolu) competing in one challenge with a cash prize of $100,000. Vosovic won the challenge, while Momolu came in second place, Sweet P in third, and March in fourth.

In 2010, eight of the contestants in this season would appear in the video game adaptation of the series, which was released shortly after the season ended.

In 2012, Gordana Gehlhausen competed on Project Runway: All Stars where she finished 11th of 13.

Also in 2012, Althea Harper competed on Project Runway All Stars (season 2) placing 8th of 13.

In 2013, Irina Shabayeva competed in Project Runway All Stars (season 3), placing 6th of 11.

In 2019, Irina Shabayeva returned for a third time to compete on Project Runway All Stars (season 7) against worldwide Project Runway winners. Irina placed 3rd.

== Contestants ==
Contestants of the sixth season

Contestant	Age	Hometown	Finish	Outcome
Ari Fish	25	Kansas City, Missouri	Episode 1	16th place
Malvin Vien	23	Brooklyn, New York	Episode 2	15th place
Mitchell Hall	25	Savannah, Georgia	Episode 3	14th place
Qristyl Frazier	41	Brooklyn, New York	Episode 4	13th place
Johnny Sakalis	29	West Hollywood, California	Episode 5	12th place
Ra'mon Lawrence Coleman	30	Minneapolis, Minnesota	Episode 6	11th place
Louise Black	31	Dallas, Texas	Episode 7	10th place
Rodney Epperson	49	New York, New York	Episode 8	9th place
Shirin Askari	23	Richardson, Texas	Episode 9	8th place
Nicolas Putvinski	26	New York, New York	Episode 10	7th place
Logan Neitzel	25	Seattle, Washington	Episode 11	6th place
Christopher Straub	29	Shakopee, Minnesota	Episode 12	4th place
Gordana Gehlhausen	44	Charleston, South Carolina	Episode 12	4th place
Carol Hannah Whitfield	23	Charleston, South Carolina	Episode 13	3rd place
Althea Harper	23	Dayton, Ohio	Episode 13	Runner-up
Irina Shabayeva	26	New York, New York	Episode 13	Winner

== Models ==
Name	Age	Hometown	Outcome
Yosuzi Sylvester	21	Los Angeles, California	16th place
Erika Macke	21	Las Vegas, Nevada	15th place
Erica Milde	23	Chicago, Illinois	14th place
Valerie Roy	27	New York, New York	13th place
Emarie Wiltz	29	New York City	12th place
Fatma Dabo	25	Los Angeles, California	11th place
Vanessa Fitzgerald	20	New York City	10th place
Tara Egan	21	Chicago, Illinois	9th place
Ebony Jointer	19	Hacienda Heights, California	8th place
Celine Chua	28	New York City	7th place
Kojii Helnwein	28	Los Angeles, California	6th place
Katie Sticksel	22	Los Angeles, California	5th place
Matar Cohen	24	New York City	4th place
Lisa Blades	24	Los Angeles, California	3rd place
Tanisha Harper	27	Los Angeles, California	Runner-up
Kalyn Hemphill	19	New York City	Winner

== Challenges ==
Designer Elimination Table
Designers	1	2	3	4	5	6	7	8	9^{2}	10	11	12	14	Eliminated Episode
Irina	IN	IN	HIGH	IN	WIN	IN	WIN	HIGH	IN	WIN	HIGH	ADV^{4}	WINNER	14 - Finale, Part 2
Althea	IN	HIGH	IN	WIN	HIGH	IN	IN	IN	HIGH	IN	WIN	ADV^{4}	RUNNER-UP	14 - Finale, Part 2
Carol Hannah	IN	IN	IN	HIGH	IN	IN	HIGH	IN	WIN	HIGH	HIGH	ADV^{4}	3RD PLACE	14 - Finale, Part 2
Gordana	IN	IN	LOW	IN	LOW	LOW	HIGH	WIN	IN	HIGH	LOW	OUT		12 - The Art of Fashion
Christopher	WIN	IN	IN	IN	HIGH	HIGH	LOW	LOW	LOW	LOW	LOW	OUT		12 - The Art of Fashion
Logan	IN	IN	IN	LOW	IN	IN	IN	LOW	LOW	LOW	OUT^{3}			11 - The Best of the Best
Nicolas	IN	IN	LOW	IN	LOW	WIN	IN^{1}	IN	HIGH	OUT				10 - Around the World in Two Days
Shirin	IN	WIN	IN	IN	IN	IN	HIGH	HIGH	OUT					9 - Sequins, Feathers and Fur, Oh My!
Epperson	IN	IN	LOW	HIGH	IN	HIGH	LOW	OUT						8 - A Fashionable New Beginning
Louise	IN	HIGH	IN	IN	IN	LOW	OUT							7 - The Sky Is the Limit
Ra'mon	HIGH	LOW	WIN	IN	IN	OUT								6 - Lights, Camera, Sew!
Johnny	HIGH	IN	HIGH	LOW	OUT									5 - Fashion Headliners
Qristyl	LOW	IN	LOW	OUT										4 - What a Woman Wants
Mitchell	LOW	LOW	OUT											3 - Rumble on the Runway
Malvin	IN	OUT												2 - We Expect Fashion
Ari	OUT													1 - Welcome to Los Angeles!

- ^Note 1: Heidi Klum cited Nicolas as "very lucky" repeatedly, stating had he not had immunity from the last challenge, he could have also been out.
- ^Note 2: Tim Gunn announced that this would be the last challenge awarding immunity to the winner. Immunity will no longer be granted from episode 9 and onward until the competition ends.
- ^Note 3: Logan made it farther than anyone else in the history of the competition without ever having a "HIGH" score.
- ^Note 4: This is the first and only season where none of the finalists ever receives a "LOW" score

The designer won Project Runway Season 6.
The designer was advanced to Fashion Week.
The designer won the challenge
The designer came in second but did not win the challenge.
The designer had one of the highest scores for that challenge, but did not win.
The designer had one of the lowest scores for that challenge, but was not eliminated.
The designer was in the bottom two, but was not eliminated.
The designer lost and was out of the competition.

=== Models of the Runway ===
Model Elimination Table^{5}
Model	1	2	3	4	5	6	7^{7}	8^{8}	9	10 ^{9}	11	12	14	Episode
Kalyn	QF	MH	IS	IS	IS	IS	NP	NP	NP	IS	IS	IS	WINNER (IS)	14 - That's a Wrap! 13 - Bryant Park Bound
Tanisha	AH	AH	AH	AH	AH	AH	RE	IS	AH	CW	AH	AH	AH	14 - That's a Wrap! 13 - Bryant Park Bound
Lisa	LB	LB	LB	CW	CW	CW	LN	CW	CW	AH	CW	CW	CW	14 - That's a Wrap! 13 - Bryant Park Bound
Matar	NP	SA	QF	RE	RE	RE	GG	GG	GG	CS	GG	GG	OUT	12 - NY Here We Come!
Katie	CS	CS	CS	CS	CS	CS	IS	CS	CS	GG	CS	CS	OUT	12 - NY Here We Come!
Kojii	CW	CW	LN	LN	LN	LN	LB	RE	LN	NP	LN	OUT		11 - It's a Sticky Situation
Celine	IS	IS	NP	NP	NP	NP	CS	LN	IS	LN	OUT			10 - Burlesque Babies
Ebony	SA	NP	SA	SA	SA	SA	CW	SA	SA	OUT				9 - Hair Today, Gone Tomorrow
Tara	GG	GG	GG	GG	GG	GG	AH	AH	OUT					8 - A Fresh Start
Vanessa	RC	RC	RC	RC	RC	RC	SA	OUT						7 - You're My Pumpkin Pie
Fatma	LN	LN	MH	LB	LB	LB	OUT							6 - Hot Mess
Emarie	JS	JS	JS	JS	JS	OUT								5 - Chic Clique
Valerie	MV	MV	CW^{6}	QF	OUT									4 - It's My Party and I'll Wear What I Want To
Erica	RE	RE	RE	OUT										3 - Frenemies
Erika	AF	QF	WD^{6}											2 - They Love Me, They Love Me Not
Yosuzi	MH	OUT												1 - Off the Runway

- ^Note 5: The aftershow "Models of the Runway" fully reveals the eliminated model of a future challenge.
- ^Note 6: Valerie was originally eliminated in Episode 2; however, she was brought back after Erika, Carol Hannah's model, voluntarily withdrew.
- ^Note 7: All the designers were required to switch models for this episode.
- ^Note 8: In place of the models, a group of divorcées modeled designs based on their old wedding dresses. Colored boxes in this column refer to the models assigned to the winning and losing designers.
- ^Note 9: The designers were once again required to switch models for this episode.

The model won Project Runway Season 6.
The model wore the winning design that challenge.
The model wore the losing design that challenge.
The model was eliminated.
The model was brought back into the competition.
The model withdrew from the competition.

Designer legend

- Althea Harper: AH
- Ari Fish: AF
- Carol Hannah Whitfield: CW
- Christopher Straub: CS
- Rodney Epperson: RE
- Gordana Gehlhausen: GG
- Irina Shabayeva: IS
- Johnny Sakalis: JS
- Logan Neitzel: LN
- Louise Black: LB
- Malvin Vien: MV
- Mitchell Hall: MH
- Nicolas Putvinski: NP
- Qristyl Frazier: QF
- Ra'mon Lawrence Coleman: RC
- Shirin Askari: SA

== Rate The Runway Results ==
Designer Elimination Table
Designer	1	2	3	4	5	6	7	8	9	10	11	12	13
Irina	IN	IN	HIGH	IN	WIN	IN	WIN	HIGH	IN	WIN	HIGH	WIN	WINNER
Althea	IN	HIGH	IN	WIN	HIGH	IN	IN	IN	HIGH	IN	WIN	LOW	OUT
Carol Hannah	IN	IN	IN	HIGH	IN	IN	HIGH	IN	WIN	HIGH	HIGH	HIGH	OUT
Gordana	IN	IN	LOW	IN	LOW	LOW	HIGH	WIN	IN	HIGH	LOW	OUT	
Christopher	WIN	IN	IN	IN	HIGH	HIGH	LOW	LOW	LOW	LOW	LOW	OUT	
Logan	IN	IN	IN	LOW	IN	IN	IN	LOW	LOW	LOW	OUT		
Nicolas	IN	IN	LOW	IN	LOW	WIN	LOW	IN	HIGH	OUT			
Shirin	IN	WIN	IN	IN	IN	IN	HIGH	HIGH	OUT				
Epperson	IN	IN	LOW	HIGH	IN	HIGH	LOW	OUT					
Louise	IN	HIGH	IN	IN	IN	LOW	OUT						
Ra'mon	HIGH	LOW	WIN	IN	IN	OUT							
Johnny	HIGH	IN	HIGH	LOW	OUT								
Qristyl	LOW	IN	LOW	OUT									
Mitchell	LOW	LOW	OUT										
Malvin	IN	OUT											
Ari	OUT												

== Episodes ==
=== Episode 1: Welcome to Los Angeles! ===
Original Airdate: August 20, 2009

The designers were asked to create a dress made for a red carpet event, focusing on innovation on their creation and making a statement on who they are as a designer. They were preassigned models for their challenge, given 30 minutes to sketch their design, a 30-minute shopping spree at Mood with a budget of $200, and two days to complete their design.

- Judges: Heidi Klum, Nina Garcia, Michael Kors
- Guest Judge: Lindsay Lohan
  - WINNER: Christopher
  - ELIMINATED: Ari

=== Episode 2: We Expect Fashion ===
Original Airdate: August 27, 2009

Designers were to create a pregnancy look for supermodel Rebecca Romijn, who was carrying twins. She was looking for something that was fashionable and easy to move in, but also something appropriate for a pregnant woman to wear out in public. Designers were given 30 minutes to sketch, a 30-minute shopping spree at Mood with a budget of $100, and two days to complete the look. The prize for the winning designer was immunity for the next challenge.

- Judges: Heidi Klum, Nina Garcia
- Guest Judges: Monique Lhuillier (sitting in for Michael Kors), Rebecca Romijn
  - WINNER: Shirin
  - ELIMINATED: Malvin

=== Episode 3: Rumble on the Runway ===
Original Airdate: September 3, 2009

The designers were taken to the beach, where they were told to create a fashionable, surfer-inspired outfit, and were placed in teams of two. Tim drew the names of team leaders via a random lotto; those team leaders then selected their partners in the order they were chosen, as follows:

Team	Team Members
1	Shirin and Carol Hannah
2	Logan and Christopher
3	Nicolas and Gordana
4	Mitchell and Ra'mon
5	Althea and Louise
6	Qristyl and Epperson
7	Johnny and Irina

Later on in the challenge, it was revealed that they would also be creating an avant-garde look inspired by their ready-to-wear, surfer-inspired outfit. They had $50 for the first look and $200 for the second. Most of the episode focused on Qristyl and Epperson, who had trouble getting along, and Mitchell and Ra'mon; Mitchell had trouble keeping on task, which caused Ra'mon to have to create both looks mostly on his own. At judging, Qristyl and Mitchell were in the bottom two, Qristyl for not being able to lead her team and Mitchell for not doing anything.

Note: This episode marks the first time a designer (and team leader) of a winning look was eliminated.

- Judges: Heidi Klum, Nina Garcia
- Guest Judges: Max Azria (sitting in for Michael Kors), Rachel Bilson
  - WINNER: Ra'mon
  - ELIMINATED: Mitchell

=== Episode 4: What a Woman Wants ===
Original Airdate: September 10, 2009

The designers were challenged to create an eye-catching outfit to please their surprise client: their models. This outfit is intended for model industry events. Designers were given a budget of $100 to shop at Mood, and a day to complete the look. The winning designer would have immunity for the next challenge.

- Judges: Heidi Klum
- Guest Judges: Marc Bouwer (sitting in for Michael Kors), Zoe Glassner (sitting in for Nina Garcia), Jennifer Rade
  - WINNER: Althea
  - ELIMINATED: Qristyl

=== Episode 5: Fashion Headliners ===
Original Airdate: September 17, 2009

Designers were taken to the Los Angeles Times, and were challenged to create an outfit made out of newspaper. They had three minutes to grab the newspaper they desired to use for design and then completed the look in a day. Designers were provided with paints and could use muslin, which could not be shown on the runway, for infrastructure. The winner would have immunity for the next challenge.

- Judges: Heidi Klum
- Guest Judges: Tommy Hilfiger (sitting in for Michael Kors), Zoe Glassner (sitting in for Nina Garcia), Eva Longoria
  - WINNER: Irina
  - ELIMINATED: Johnny

=== Episode 6: Lights, Camera, Sew! ===
Original Airdate: September 24, 2009

Designers were challenged to create a movie character and design a look inspired by different movie genres for this character. Due to Irina's win in the last challenge (and the odd number of remaining contestants), Tim allowed her to choose whichever genre she desired. After that, two people were allotted per genre. Tim chose their names out of a bag at random.

The designers and their genres were as follows:

Genre	Designers
Action/Adventure	Carol Hannah, Logan
Film Noir	Althea, Irina, Louise
Period Piece	Christopher, Gordana
Sci-Fi	Nicolas, Ra'mon
Western	Epperson, Shirin

They were given $150 and a day to complete their designs. The winner received immunity for the next challenge. The judges praised Nicolas, Epperson, and Christopher for their creativity and the ideas behind their muses. Meanwhile, Gordana and Louise were criticized for a lack of creativity, while Ra'mon's dress showed a lack of craftsmanship. It was this, along with his fabric selection, that got him eliminated.

- Judges: Heidi Klum
- Guest Judges: John Varvatos (sitting in for Michael Kors), Zoe Glassner (sitting in for Nina Garcia), Arianne Phillips
  - WINNER: Nicolas
  - ELIMINATED: Ra'mon

=== Episode 7: The Sky Is the Limit ===
Original Airdate: October 1, 2009

Designers were challenged to create two garments for Macy's; both had to be blue and fit in with Macy's exclusive I⋅N⋅C International Concepts line of clothing. Designers had to pitch ideas to Macy's executive Martine Reardon, who chose five designers' ideas for completion. The designers then had to work in pairs; team leaders were the designers with the favored sketches, who then chose their partners in the following order when Tim selected their name from a bag at random. The leaders and their partners, respectively, were:

Team	Team Members
1	Althea and Logan
2	Christopher and Epperson
3	Louise and Nicolas
4	Irina and Gordana
5	Carol Hannah and Shirin

The winner of this challenge would not receive immunity, but would instead make a holiday dress to be sold in select Macy's stores nationwide and on Macy's.com. There was a suggested possibility for one or more people to go home. Had two people gone home, Christopher would have been the other

- Judges: Heidi Klum, Michael Kors
- Guest Judges: Zanna Roberts (sitting in for Nina Garcia), Martine Reardon
  - WINNER: Irina (teamed with Gordana Gehlhausen)
  - ELIMINATED: Louise (teamed with Nicolas Putvinski)

=== Episode 8: A Fashionable New Beginning ===
Original Airdate: October 8, 2009

Designers were challenged to reconstruct a divorcée's wedding gown and turn it into a new dress. Each designer was allocated a divorcée, who fed their respective designers ideas on how to translate their gowns. They were given $25 to spend at Mood and were allowed to buy a maximum of two yards of fabric. The challenge ended at midnight. The winner of the challenge received the last immunity for the remainder of the season's challenges.

- Judges: Heidi Klum, Michael Kors
- Guest Judges: Zanna Roberts (sitting in for Nina Garcia), Tamara Mellon
  - WINNER: Gordana
  - ELIMINATED: Epperson

=== Episode 9: Sequins, Feathers and Fur, Oh My! ===
Original Airdate: October 15, 2009

The designers were required to make a dazzling and show-stopping stage look for guest judge Christina Aguilera. This outfit was intended to catch the attention of the audience in the back of the theater, as well as appear chic on camera close-ups. They were given a budget of $300 and two days to complete their designs. The winner would no longer be granted immunity from this point forth.

- Judges: Heidi Klum, Nina Garcia
- Guest Judges: Bob Mackie (sitting in for Michael Kors), Christina Aguilera
  - WINNER: Carol Hannah
  - ELIMINATED: Shirin

=== Episode 10: Around the World in Two Days ===
Original Airdate: October 22, 2009

For this challenge, the designers embarked on a trip to the Michael Kors boutique, where Kors briefed them about drawing inspiration from seven select locales around the world. Designers chose in the following order, beginning with Carol Hannah as a benefit from her previous win:

Location	Designer
Palm Beach, Florida	Carol Hannah
Greece	Nicolas
Saint-Tropez	Althea
New York City	Gordana
Aspen, Colorado	Irina
Santa Fe, New Mexico	Christopher
Hollywood, California	Logan

They were given $150 to shop at Mood and one day to complete their looks.

- Judges: Heidi Klum, Nina Garcia, Michael Kors
- Guest Judge: Milla Jovovich
  - WINNER: Irina
  - ELIMINATED: Nicolas

=== Episode 11: The Best of the Best ===
Original Airdate: October 29, 2009

Before being presented with their challenge, the designers were required to be facing away from the runway. When Heidi emerged, they were surprised to see looks of theirs from previous challenges. They were asked to create a companion piece from their winning look. (Irina, who has three wins as of this episode, was given her most recent look; Logan, who has never won or been in the top before, was presented with his first look by default.) The designers were given $100 to shop at Mood and one day to complete their outfits. In the workroom, Althea noticed Logan was creating a similar collar to that of her top three design from Episode 9. On the runway, Irina insinuated that Althea's coat was inspired by Irina's previous winning look, but the judges ignored this complaint and awarded Althea the win.

- Judges: Heidi Klum, Nina Garcia
- Guest Judges: Nick Verreos (sitting in for Michael Kors), Kerry Washington
  - WINNER: Althea
  - ELIMINATED: Logan

=== Episode 12: The Art of Fashion ===
Original Airdate: November 5, 2009

For their final runway challenge before New York Fashion Week, the designers embarked to Los Angeles's famed Getty Center (a portion of the J. Paul Getty Museum), where they were greeted by Tim and the mayor of Los Angeles, Antonio Villaraigosa. After the mayor greeted them, Tim explained that their challenge would be to draw inspiration from any location in and around the Getty Center. After 30 minutes of browsing (with their models in tow as muses) and 30 minutes of sketching, they were given $300 to shop at Mood for the final time. On the runway, no concise top or bottom was indicated. Rather, the judges had compliments and criticisms for all. Heidi then asked each designer to explain why they felt they were worthy of making it to Bryant Park and which two designers they would take with them. There was no one winner for this challenge; instead, each designer was either advanced to the final round or eliminated. However, the magazine featuring the winner featured Carol Hannah.

- Judges: Heidi Klum, Nina Garcia
- Guest Judges: Cynthia Rowley (sitting in for Michael Kors), Cindy Crawford
  - ADVANCED: Althea, Carol Hannah, and Irina
  - ELIMINATED: Christopher and Gordana

=== Episode 13: Finale - Part 1 ===
Original Airdate: November 12, 2009

For part 1 of the finale, Heidi Klum and Tim Gunn sent the remaining contestants (Irina, Carol Hannah and Althea) home with $9000 and ten weeks to create a 12-piece collection. The narrative shifts to a few weeks later when Tim Gunn arrives at the contestants' homes to critique their collections. In addition to providing an outside opinion, he also joins each contestant for a meal with their friends and family. Ten days before New York Fashion Week, Tim calls Irina to inform her that the images that she is using for her collection are copyrighted and cannot be used. The week before Bryant Park, Althea and Irina arrive in New York; Tim arrives later to inform them that Carol Hannah has fallen ill with a stomach virus, although she feels better and joins them in the workroom the next day. The three, over the course of the next week, pick models and finish their collections before Heidi and Tim arrive with a surprise: they must create, complete and integrate one more piece into their collection. Previous contestants Gordana, Logan and Christopher arrive to help them. The show ends with Carol Hannah falling ill once again.

Team	Team Members
1	Althea and Logan
2	Irina and Gordana
3	Carol Hannah and Christopher

=== Episode 14: Finale - Part 2 ===
Original Airdate: November 19, 2009

- Judges: Heidi Klum, Nina Garcia, Michael Kors
- Guest Judge: Suzy Menkes
  - WINNER: Irina
  - ELIMINATED: Carol Hannah and Althea
