= Mychael Knight =

American fashion designer (1978–2017)

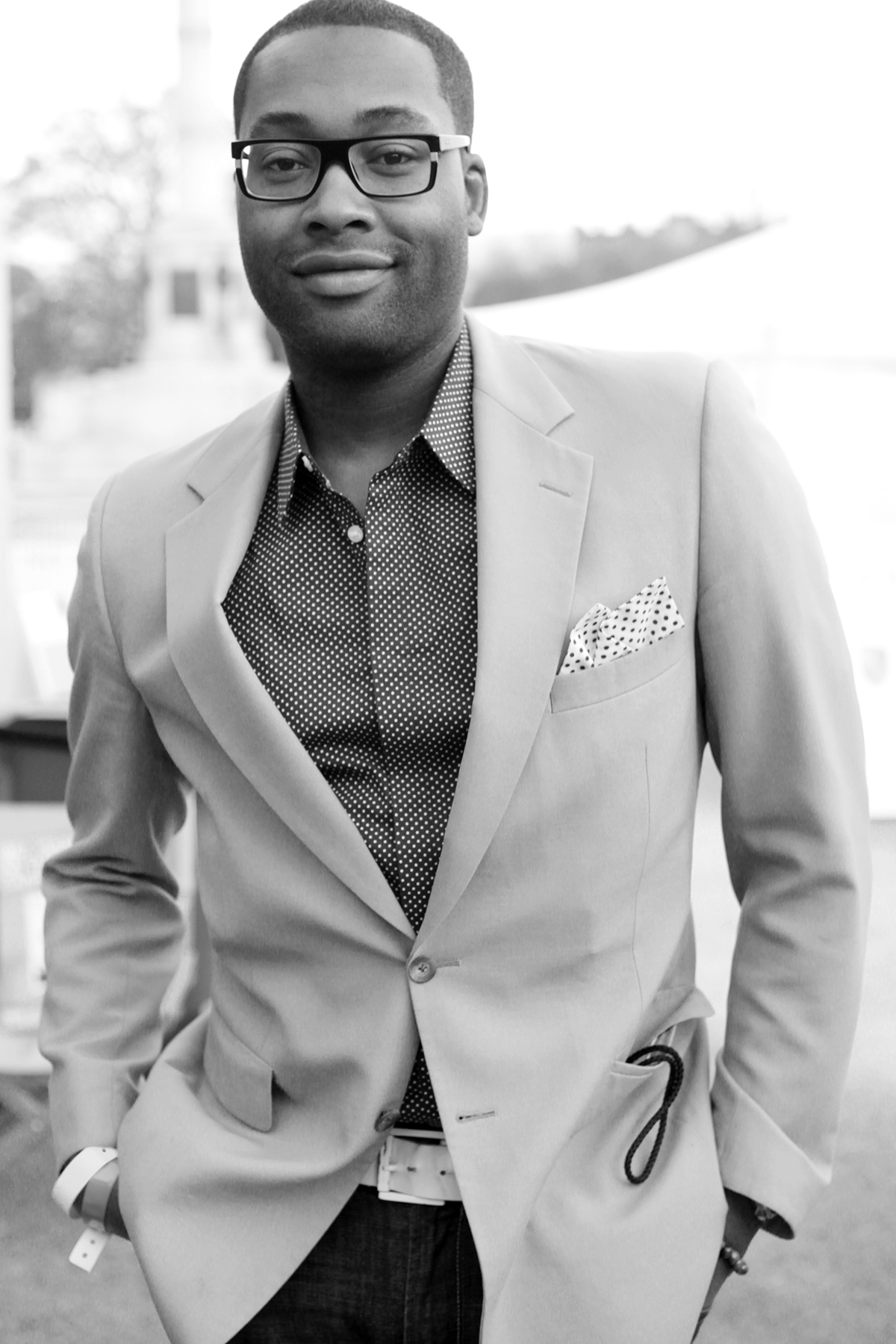
- Knight at the Charleston Fashion Week
- Born: April 11, 1978; Nuremberg, Germany
- Died: October 17, 2017 (aged 39); Atlanta, Georgia
- Education: Apparel Design and Merchandising (BS)
- Occupation: Fashion designer
- Television: Project Runway Season 3 (4th)

Michael Anthony Knight Jr. (April 11, 1978 – October 17, 2017) was an American fashion designer.

== Biography ==
=== Early life ===
Michael Anthony Knight Jr. was born on April 11, 1978, in Nuremberg, Germany to Pamela and Michael Anthony Knight Sr.

Although Knight spent his childhood in Montgomery, Alabama, in 1996 he received his high school diploma from Washingtonville Senior High School in Washingtonville, New York. Later that same year, Knight began his freshman year of college at Georgia Southern University in Statesboro, Georgia. In 2001, this university awarded Knight a Bachelor of Science degree in Apparel Design and Merchandising.

After completing his undergraduate studies, Knight broke into the fashion industry in Atlanta, Georgia by working as an intern at Wilbourn Exclusives in 2001 and then by becoming a fashion stylist in the music industry in 2002.

=== Project Runway and later career ===
In 2005, Knight auditioned for the second season of the Bravo network reality television series, Project Runway, but he was not accepted as a season two contestant. In 2006, Knight reauditioned for Project Runway, and this time he was accepted as a contestant for season three. Knight went on to win season three's Fan Favorite award and to place fourth in the overall competition.

In 2007, Knight introduced his label, Mychael Knight, on BET's Rip the Runway and he designed a line of custom tees for the Starbucks Corporation.

In 2008, Knight launched Kitty & Dick, his female and male lingerie label, and his unisex fragrance, MajK.

On August 20, 2009, the Project Runway: All Star Challenge aired on Lifetime Television. Knight joined Daniel Vosovic and Santino Rice of season two, Jeffrey Sebelia and Uli Herzner of season three, Chris March and Sweet P of season four, and Korto Momolu of season five in a special, "one-shot" competition where the winner, Vosovic, received $100,000.

On March 17, 2010, Knight debuted his Fall/Winter 2010 line at Charleston Fashion Week in Charleston, South Carolina.

In 2013, Knight became a contestant on season 3 of Project Runway: All Stars.

Knight died on October 17, 2017, at the age of 39. His cause of death has not been made public.

Preceded by Creation	Fan Favorite; Mychael Knight	Succeeded by Christian Siriano
