= Keith Michael =

American fashion designer

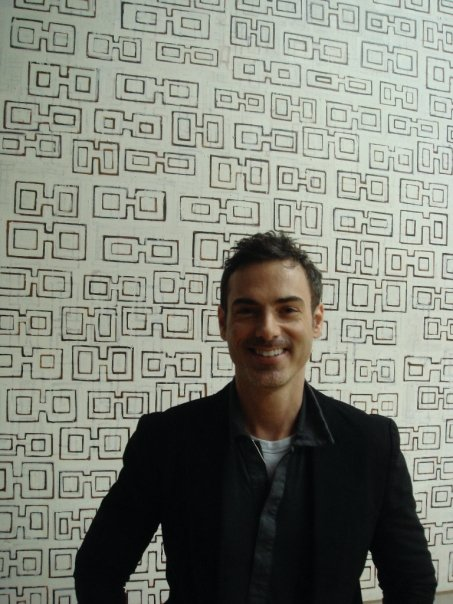
- Born: January 14, 1972 (age 54)
- Education: Pratt University/FIT
- Occupation: fashion designer
- Television: Project Runway Season 3 (Disqualified)

Keith Michael (born Keith Michael Rizza on January 14, 1972) is an American fashion designer based in New York City. Michael participated in the third season of American reality show Project Runway.

== Education and career ==
A native of Brooklyn, New York, Keith Michael attended the Pratt Institute as an illustration major, then turned his attention toward photography. He took a job as a receptionist at a photography studio, and was soon promoted to stylist, assistant photographer, and finally, photographer. His photography has been published in W, ELLE, GQ and BlackBook magazines. He has his own line of men's and women's clothing which has been described as "natural, organic and lovingly hand finished." (Andrea Cusick of Nylon magazine). He has also been honored with a nomination for "Best Newcomer of the Year" by Sportswear International. Michael's distinctive tightly tailored clothes are sold in high end boutiques in Los Angeles and New York City.

== Project Runway ==
Despite having a design focus on men's wear, Michael auditioned for Project Runway, a women's wear design reality television show competition on the Bravo Network. Michael came out as a front-runner from the beginning by winning the first challenge and receiving immunity for the second. Michael was also told on air by show host, Heidi Klum, that he might have won the third challenge, but did not because he did not fully complete the task (the third challenge was to make an outfit for a woman and her dog; Michael refused to make a dog outfit). Michael was made the leader of his team in the fourth challenge based on his sketches for the challenge.

=== Disqualification ===
According to Tim Gunn, the contracts which are signed by the designers upon qualifying for Project Runway clearly state that pattern-making books, fashion how-to books, fashion magazines, or other such materials are not allowed anywhere on the production. Designers are also not allowed to leave the production without being accompanied by a member of the production staff, to ensure that they do not gain even temporary access to such materials, outside assistance or suggestions, or materials for their challenge garments not acquired according to the challenge parameters.

During the episode "Reap What You Sew", it was revealed that designer Kayne Gillaspie discovered pattern-making books in Keith's room at their Atlas apartment. Upon consultation with other designers in the apartment, he brought the books to the attention of the producers. When other designers found out about the pattern book discovery, there was a confrontation between the designers over the presence of the books, and Michael left the production for several hours, during which time he accessed the Internet and e-mailed one of the producers.

Kayne Gillaspie: Actually, a couple of the people that had been kicked off in the first three episodes, Malan [Breton], Katherine [Gerdes] and Stacey [Estrella], during the two-day photo shoot – they were the ones who were pissed and actually confronted Keith first. They're the ones who blew it up. I never said a word to Keith. Of course, afterwards, I had to say, "Yeah, I did see it. I did tell a producer." But I wasn't being malicious.

Robert Best: That's a really good point. I remember specifically, Katherine, she was really sweet, but she confronted Keith and they had a huge shouting match at the photo shoot. It was really unpleasant, and that's when he was like, "I was being attacked, I felt scared. Blah blah blah," and he bailed. He left the photo shoot.

— Kayne Gillaspie and Robert Best

Upon consideration of the presence of the pattern making books and Michael's disappearance, he was dismissed from the show mid-challenge.

=== Michael's side ===
Michael's version of the events is that:

1. there was no disclaimer in the contract stating that pattern-making books were illegal in the context of the competition.
2. the books were taken from him, and later returned to his room by an unknown person.

When the books were discovered by the other designers, there was apparently an off-screen altercation between the designers prior to the producers making any kind of decision on the issue. Michael stated that he informed a production assistant that he was leaving pursuant to the confrontation and was allowed to leave unescorted. He then went to his boyfriend's apartment and used the Internet to e-mail a few people. He stated in his exit interview that he never used the pattern books "to give myself an unfair advantage". This statement was coupled with a scene of Michael persuading the staff at MOOD to give his team a substantial discount (reducing a $98 cost to $80) on fabrics so that they could purchase other materials for the challenge.
