= Rami Kashou =

Palestinian fashion designer (born 1976)

- Born: May 11, 1976 (age 50); Jerusalem, Israel
- Occupation: Fashion designer
- Known for: Project Runway
- Website: ramikashou.com

Rami Kashou (born May 11, 1976 in Jerusalem) is a fashion designer, a runner-up in season 4 of the reality show Project Runway (2007), and a contestant on Project Runway: All Stars (2012) and Project Runway season 20 (2023). He describes his aesthetic as timeless, romantic, and inspired by freedom.

In the early 2000s, Kashou featured his work in Mercedes-Benz Fashion Week, America’s Next Top Model ad campaign, and Home Shopping Network, and he received the GenArt Alumni sponsorship and was commissioned by Queen Rania of Jordan to design clothing for her appearances. Kashou returned to the West Bank in 2016 to showcase his designs, gather inspiration from the Arab world, and mentor local designers in a sustainable fashion challenge sponsored by the Qattan Foundation.

== Biography ==
Kashou was born May 11, 1976, in Jerusalem, and raised in the nearby city of Ramallah. As a 5 year old, he showed an interest in helping his grandmother pick out dresses. While as a child he initially hid his fashion sketches, his parents supported his passion of design. His father, a businessman, encouraged him to build his own career, and his mother shared his designs with her friends and brought him to the local seamstress. Kashou describes his inspiration as: "The dreams to become a designer came from the lack of childhood space, growing up among jeeps, soldiers, intimidation, violence and occupation. I think the subconscious choice of creativity and design kind of happened as a way of coping with a difficult reality which I lived and endured."

In 1996, shortly after graduating high school, Kashou moved to the United States and settled in California. In 1997, he enrolled in design courses at Brooks College but eventually dropped out. In his early 20s, he worked in retail and sold consignment, including several tops picked by Aaliyah's stylist and worn by the singer. After a work trip to Europe, Kashou bought two sewing machines and began studying patterning from the local vintage stores.

== Career ==
Kashou incorporates music into his creative process, leaning towards dramatic and emotional songs and pieces that incorporate his heritage. He has spoken of the challenges fast fashion creates both towards individual designers and the devaluation and disposability of clothing. Designers who inspire him include Iris Van Herpen, Valentino, and Madame Gres.

Throughout the 2000s and early 2010s, Kashou displayed his work in fashion weeks, ad campaigns, and TV shopping networks. In the early 2000s, Kashou showcased his fashion design work in numerous seasons at Mercedes-Benz Fashion Week. He also received the GenArt Alumni sponsorship and featured his collection in the tents of Bryant Park in Spring 2003. In March 2005, Kashou was commissioned to design costumes for the America’s Next Top Model ad campaign, displayed on billboards nationwide. Kashou made guest appearances multiple times on the Home Shopping Network, featuring exclusive designs for the show "Curations" that sold out on-air. Queen Rania of Jordan commissioned Kashou to create exclusive designs for her public appearances.

Kashou's designs have appeared in the pages of The New York Times Magazine and Women’s Wear Daily, as well as Vogue, Interview, Elle, InStyle, Lucky, People, and Us Weekly. He has designed for a number of celebrities, including: Jessica Alba, Fergie, Tyra Banks, Amy Smart, Erykah Badu, Lucy Liu, Tracee Ellis Ross, Lindsay Lohan, Paris Hilton, Penelope Cruz, and Shiva Rose, as well as Dita Von Teese, Heidi Klum, and Kim Kardashian. He has also designed for Keri Hilson and Rihanna.

In 2016, Kashou returned to Palestine to develop and market his brand to the Arab world and study the local market. Some of his projects have involved cross-stitched hand embroidery by Palestinian women. In his hometown, he mentored a group of designers for a month long challenge to create "a series of green and environmentally friendly designs from recycled materials," finishing in a fashion show with a cash prize for one designer provided by the Qattan Foundation, "an organization serving education and culture in Palestine and the Arab world."

== Project Runway ==
In 2007, Kashou appeared on the fourth season of Project Runway and finished in 2nd place. In 2012, Kashou participated in the first season of Project Runway: All Stars and finished in 8th place. The same year, he collaborated with stationery company Papyrus to design paper dresses exhibited in the chain's stores. Once again appearing on Project Runway during its 20th season (2023), Kashou cited inspiration from the concept of freedom of movement in contrast to his life living under military occupation.
