= Camilla Barungi =

Ugandan fashion and runway model

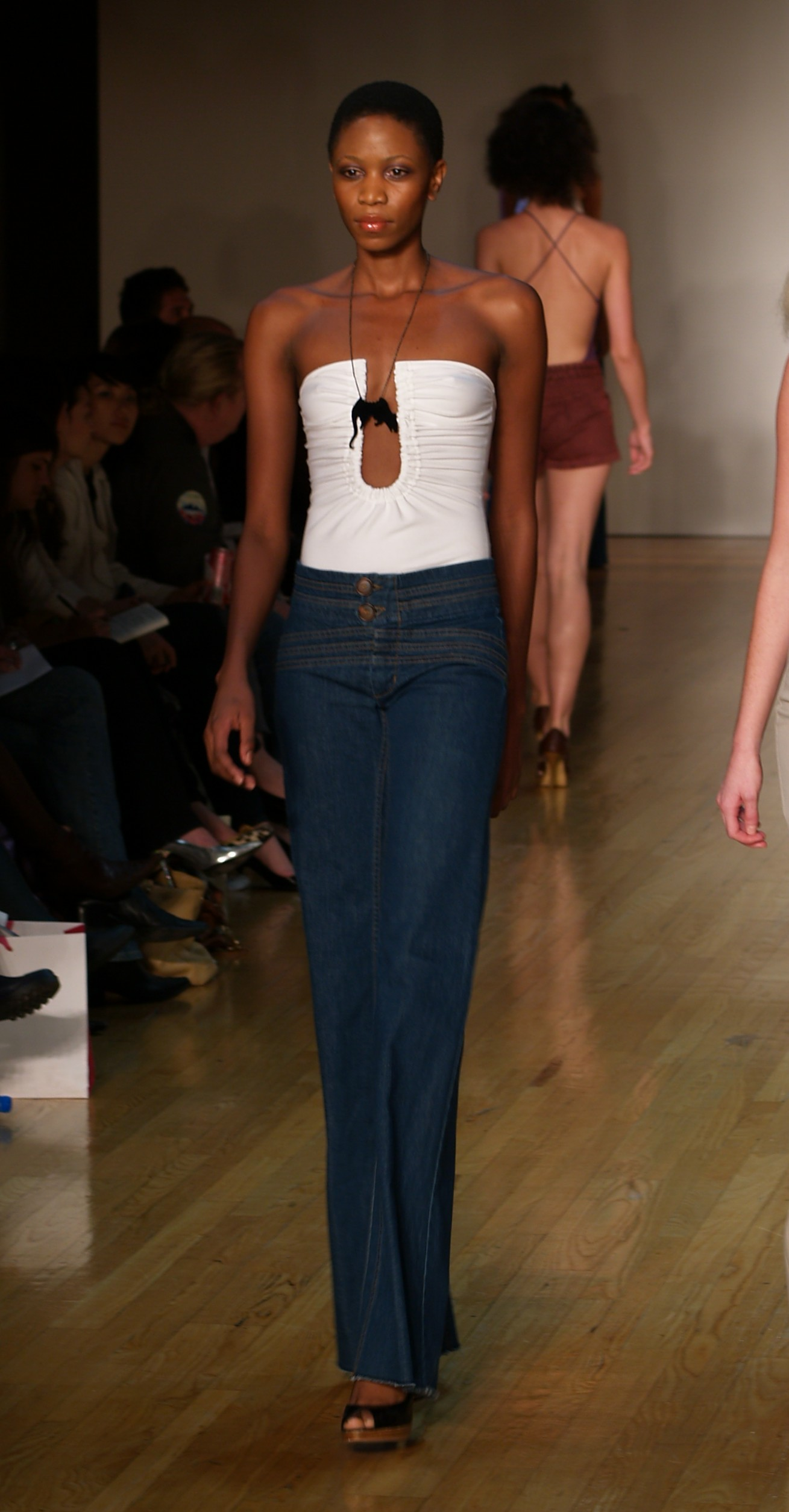
Camilla Barungi

Camilla Barungi is a Ugandan fashion/runway model who was born in 1981. She is also a New York-based fashion model.

== Career ==
Barungi was discovered by a fashion agent while studying at San Jose State University.

On 27 August 2015, she addressed the United Nations on including Sustainable Fashion in their implementation of the SDGs as part of the proposal for the 2030 Agenda for Sustainable Development. In 2019, she spoke at a similar event organized at the United Nations by the permanent mission of Sweden to the UN.

=== Innovations ===
Barungi launched her first entrepreneurial venture in 2008 working with women's co-ops in East Africa producing sustainable ingredients to supply the global beauty industry.
