= Kayne Gillaspie =

American fashion designer

Johnathan Kayne Gillaspie
- Born: March 14, 1979 (age 46)
- Education: Fashion Institute of Technology (FIT)
- Occupation: Fashion Designer
- Television: Project Runway Season 3 (5th)

Johnathan Kayne Gillaspie (born March 14, 1979) is an American fashion designer, specializing in eveningwear gowns. His brand Johnathan Kayne is distributed to specialty retail stores internationally. Kayne gained attention as a contestant on the third season of the Bravo reality series Project Runway and as a contestant on the second season of the Lifetime series Project Runway All Stars.

== Education and career ==
Gillaspie earned a full scholarship to Volunteer State Community College, where he studied pre-veterinarian medicine. While working at a veterinary clinic for four and a half years, he took a second job as a sketch artist at a local pageant and eveningwear boutique in Nashville, Tennessee. Two of his five sisters competed in scholarship pageants to help put themselves through college and Gillaspie helped them with their preparation for the pageants, especially when it came to wardrobe. He quickly became enamored of fashion, changed his major and transferred to the Fashion Institute of Technology (FIT) in New York City. In 2002, he won the Critics Choice Award at FIT for eveningwear and graduated magna cum laude. He moved back to Nashville after graduation and opened Kayne's Clothing Boutique, where he created custom ballroom dance costumes, evening wear, and wardrobe for the country music industry.

In 2003, the openly gay Gillaspie and his former partner bought Southern Charm/Alter Ego, an established formal wear and pageant store in Norman, Oklahoma. He and the store were both featured on an episode of the MTV reality series Tiara Girls. After much hard work and endless nights behind the sewing machine, Gillaspie built an impressive name for himself in the pageant world. In December, 2005, he dressed the entire top five teen contestants in the Miss Oklahoma Teen USA pageant and the winner and first runner up in the Miss Oklahoma U.S.A. pageant.

In 2007, Gillaspie was chosen as one of 15 contestants to compete on a Project Runway Season 3 on Bravo TV. He is no longer associated with Southern Charm/Alter Ego. Gillaspie now works out of his studio in Norman and travels extensively showcasing his private collection, his exclusive line with WOW prom and pageant, and his shoe line through Benjamin Walk.

For the 2008 Miss America Pageant, in Las Vegas, Gillaspie had several designs featured on contestants, including the talent costume for first runner-up, Miss Indiana Nicole Rash.

On April 28 and 29, 2008, Gillaspie was a guest star at the Broadway Cares Easter Bonnet Competition. The competition is held in New York City at the Minskoff Theatre, home of The Lion King (musical).

Gillaspie has been featured in numerous magazines, and is on the cover of the May 2008 edition of Distinctly Oklahoma Magazine with a feature story inside. On April 30, 2008, he was interviewed on KWTV News 9 talking about his career, article in the magazine, and also announced being involved with an upcoming television show on E! Television Network.

On October 24, 2008, Gillaspie launched his newest line, called Kayne9, dog couture. The line is made in Oklahoma and was available for purchase from the Johnathan Kayne Studio located in Norman, Oklahoma.

== Project Runway ==
While appearing on Project Runway, Gillaspie won the "Fit for a Queen" challenge that required designers to create an evening gown for Miss USA Tara Conner to wear in the Miss Universe pageant. Tara went on to be placed fourth runner up in the Miss Universe pageant wearing her custom-made dress. He was the tenth competitor to be eliminated (eleventh overall to leave the show) during season three, making him the last contestant to be eliminated before New York Fashion Week. He lost the "Black and White" challenge, in which designers had to make cocktail dresses using only the aforementioned colors. Gillaspie was not the only competitor to go home during that challenge; previously eliminated contestants Angela Keslar and Vincent Libretti were brought back for the challenge as a reward for previous wins, yet were sent home again.
