= Jeffrey Sebelia =

American fashion designer

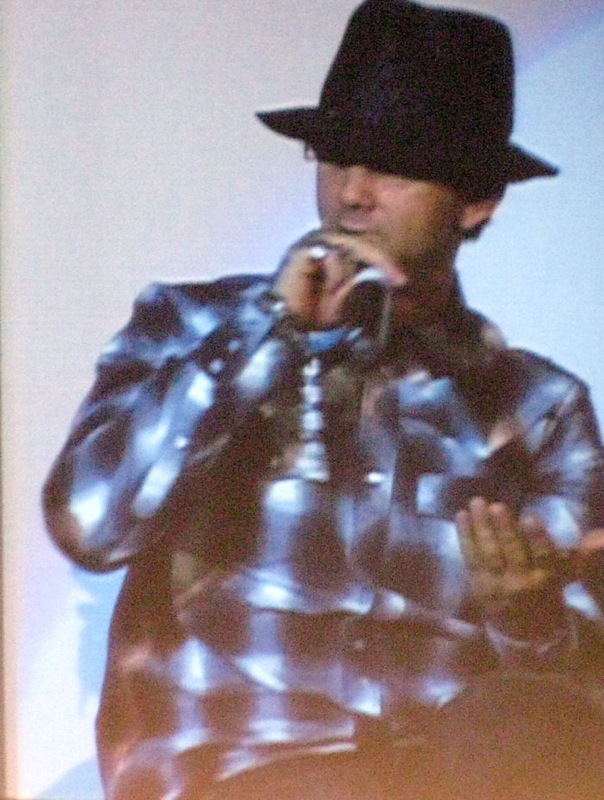
- Sebelia in August 2007
- Education: Los Angeles Trade-Technical College
- Occupations: fashion designer, musician
- Television: Project Runway Season 3 (Winner)

Jeffrey Sebelia is an American fashion designer, musician and founder of the clothing label Cosa Nostra, which he headed from a loft on Broadway in downtown Los Angeles. He is best known as the winner of the third season of American reality show Project Runway.

== Early career ==
In the early 1990s Sebelia was a member of the band Lifter, which was signed by Interscope Records. They had a minor radio hit with the song "402," but they disbanded. Lifter's song "Swing" was featured in Jeffrey's runway show at Olympus Fashion Week.

After a successful drug rehabilitation at the age of 31, Sebelia enrolled in sewing classes at Los Angeles Trade-Technical College. It was there that he immediately fell in love with design, and shortly after he started the clothing line Cosa Nostra. Among the label's celebrity clients were Dave Navarro, Gwen Stefani, Jennifer Lopez, Red Hot Chili Peppers, Marilyn Manson, Elton John, Madonna, and Tommy Lee. The Cosa Nostra label was available in about twenty stores worldwide.

== Project Runway ==
In the spring of 2006, Sebelia auditioned for the Bravo series Project Runway after seeing the success his friend, former contestant Santino Rice, had enjoyed. Jeffrey was selected to compete, was one of the final four contestants to display their collections at Fashion Week, and was chosen the winner. He had been portrayed as the third season's "villain," notorious for his explicit language and making fellow contestant Angela Keslar's mother cry when he worked with her as a client for a challenge.

Sebelia's final winning collection was filled with bright colors, flowing dresses, and smart separates, his collection was strikingly different from the trademark grunge, punk, and rock 'n' roll-style outfits he had created throughout the season. His winnings included $100,000 to develop his own clothing line, a 2007 Saturn Sky, a year's representation by Designer's Management Agency, and a 15-page spread - featuring Marilinda Rivera, the model with whom he was paired during most of the Project Runway challenges - in ELLE magazine.

== Post-Project Runway Career ==
Sebelia put his 100,000 prize into his brand Cosa Nostra. In 2007, he was hired to design a live-action film featuring the Bratz cartoon characters. He lost the gig after calling the characters "slutty" in an interview. In 2009, Cosa Nostra failed. Sebelia then put out an eponymous collection, but that too appears to have ended.

In 2010 Sebelia was named head designer of a brand called Fluxus. He left that job to launch edgy kids line La Miniatura with friend, Melissa Bochco.

In 2013, Sebelia became a contestant on Project Runway: All Stars (season 3), where he ranked 7th out of 11 contestants.

== Personal life ==
Sebelia's father was violent, and divorced his mother when Jeffrey was eight years old. Later, Jeffrey, who felt responsible for the divorce, began using cocaine and marijuana. By the time he was 16, he was a heroin addict living in a friend's garage. The following 15 years were filled with numerous, yet failed, attempts to get sober at a number of West Coast drug treatment centers. He has never been far from the spotlight and has been friends with Dave Navarro since they were teens. Chester Bennington of Linkin Park, who was also an avid client, loved the Cosa Nostra line and knew Sebelia for years.

Before the show, Sebelia had lived with his girlfriend, Melanie Vesey, and their young son, Harrison. However, after completing Project Runway Sebelia separated from his girlfriend. It was Harrison, Sebelia's son, who inspired his trademark neck tattoo which took more than eight hours to complete. The tattoo reads "Harrison Detroit l’amor de la mia vita." It is his son's name, along with the phrase "the love of my life," in Italian. But the tattoo contains a mistake; the correct diction is "l'amore della mia vita".
