= Project Runway season 5 =

Project Runway
- Season 5
- Region 1 DVD cover
- No. of tasks: 13
- No. of contestants: 16
- Winner: Leanne Marshall
- No. of episodes: 14

Release
- Original network: Bravo
- Original release: July 16 – October 15, 2008

Season chronology
- ← Previous; Season 4 Next → Season 6

The fifth season of Project Runway began filming the first week of June 2008 and premiered on July 16, 2008 at 9:00 p.m. It was the final season of Project Runway that aired on Bravo. Subsequent seasons were shown on Lifetime.

Returning as judges were supermodel Heidi Klum, fashion designer Michael Kors, and Elle editor-at-large Nina Garcia. Tim Gunn returned as a mentor to the designers.

The final four designers all produced collections for Bryant Park Fashion Week. The winner of this season of Project Runway, Leanne Marshall, received an editorial feature in an issue of Elle magazine, a cash prize of $100,000 from TRESemmé hair care to start her own line, the opportunity to sell a fashion line on Bluefly.com, and a new 2009 Saturn Vue automobile.

Jerell Scott and Kenley Collins later appeared in Project Runway All Stars in 2012, with Jerell coming 5th, and Kenley 4th. Stephen "Suede" Baum, in the same year, competed in the second season of the All Stars edition placing 11th out of 13. Korto Momolu competed in the third season of All Stars, placing 2nd of 11. Stella Zotis appeared in the fifth season of All Stars, placing 11th of 13.

In 2023, Korto Momolu competed in Project Runway season 20, placing 6th of 14.

== Contestants ==
| Contestant | Age | Hometown | Finish | Outcome |
|---|---|---|---|---|
| Jerry Tam | 32 | Butte, MT | Episode 1 | 16th place |
| Wesley Nault | 23 | Blackstone, MA | Episode 2 | 15th place |
| Emily Brandle | 27 | Sacramento, CA | Episode 3 | 14th place |
| Jennifer Diederich | 27 | East Syracuse, NY | Episode 4 | 13th place |
| Kelli Martin | 27 | Columbus, OH | Episode 5 | 12th place |
| Daniel Feld | 25 | Great Barrington, MA | Episode 6 | 11th place |
| Keith Bryce | 26 | Salt Lake City, UT | Episode 7 | 10th place |
| Stella Zotis | 42 | Astoria, NY | Episode 8 | 9th place |
| Blayne Walsh | 23 | Yakima, WA | Episode 9 | 7th place |
| Terri Stevens | 39 | Chicago, IL | Episode 9 | 7th place |
| Joe Faris | 41 | Troy, MI | Episode 10 | 6th place |
| Stephen "Suede" Baum | 37 | Seven Hills, OH | Episode 11 | 5th place |
| Jerell Scott | 28 | Houston, TX | Episode 13 | 4th place |
| Kenley Collins | 25 | New York, NY | Episode 14 | 3rd place |
| Korto Momolu | 33 | Monrovia, Liberia | Episode 14 | Runner-up |
| Leanne Marshall | 27 | Portland, OR | Episode 14 | Winner |

=== Models ===
The 16 models in season 5 are (in order of elimination):

| Contestant | Age | Hometown | Outcome |
|---|---|---|---|
| Janine Bell | 24 | Maryland | 16th place |
| Runa Lucienne | 19 | Ohio | 15th place |
| Leslie Manzano | 19 | New Hartford, New York | 14th place |
| Alex Arace | 24 | New Jersey | 13th place |
| Shannone Holt | 21 | Brooklyn, New York | 12th place |
| Elena Abete | 19 | Austin, Texas | 11th place |
| Alyssa Aparicio | 18 | Bronx, New York | 10th place |
| Kendall Hightower | 19 | Houston, Texas | 9th place |
| Polina Frantsena | N/A | Boston, Massachusetts | 8th place |
| Karalyn West | 21 | Columbus, Ohio | 7th place |
| Germaine Volorioz | 27 | New Jersey | 6th place |
| Xaviera Tytler | 22 | Phoenix, Arizona | 5th place |
| Nicole Zaager | 20 | New York, New York | 4th place |
| Topacio Pena | 22 | Dominican Republic | 3rd place |
| Katarina Munez | 20 | New Jersey | Runner-up |
| Tia Shipman | 21 | Maryland | Winner |

== Challenges ==
Designer elimination chart
| Designers | 1 | 2^{1} | 3 | 4 | 5^{2} | 6 | 7 | 8^{3} | 9^{4} | 10 | 11 | 12^{5} | 13 | 14 | Eliminated Episode |
|---|---|---|---|---|---|---|---|---|---|---|---|---|---|---|---|
| Leanne | IN | LOW | HIGH | IN | LOW | IN | WIN | WIN | HIGH | LOW | LOW | HIGH | ADV | WINNER | 14 – Finale, Part 2 |
| Korto | HIGH | LOW | IN | WIN | IN | HIGH | HIGH | HIGH | HIGH | HIGH | WIN | LOW | ADV | RUNNER-UP | 14 – Finale, Part 2 |
| Kenley | IN | HIGH | WIN | IN | HIGH | IN | IN | HIGH | LOW | HIGH | LOW | LOW | ADV | 3RD PLACE | 14 – Finale, Part 2 |
| Jerell | IN | IN | IN | LOW | HIGH | LOW | HIGH | IN | WIN | WIN | HIGH | WIN | OUT | | 13 – Finale, Part 1 |
| Suede | IN | WIN | IN | IN | IN | IN | IN | LOW | LOW | LOW | OUT | | | | 11 – Rock N' Runway |
| Joe | IN | IN | IN | HIGH | IN | WIN | IN | LOW | HIGH | OUT | | | | | 10 – Transformation |
| Terri | IN | IN | HIGH | HIGH | IN | HIGH | IN | IN | OUT | | | | | | 9 – What's Your Sign? |
| Blayne | LOW | IN | IN | IN | LOW | IN | LOW | IN | OUT | | | | | | 9 – What's Your Sign? |
| Stella | LOW | HIGH | IN | IN | HIGH | IN | LOW | OUT | | | | | | | 8 – Double 0 Fashion |
| Keith | IN | IN | LOW | IN | WIN | LOW | OUT | | | | | | | | 7 – Fashion That Drives You |
| Daniel | HIGH | IN | IN | LOW | LOW | OUT | | | | | | | | | 6 – Good Queen Fun |
| Kelli | WIN | IN | IN | IN | OUT | | | | | | | | | | 5 – Welcome to the Jungle |
| Jennifer | IN | IN | LOW | OUT | | | | | | | | | | | 4 – Rings of Glory |
| Emily | IN | IN | OUT | | | | | | | | | | | | 3 – Bright Lights/Big City |
| Wesley | IN | OUT | | | | | | | | | | | | | 2 – The Grass Is Always Greener |
| Jerry | OUT | | | | | | | | | | | | | | 1 – Let's Start from the Beginning |

- ^Note 1: Instead of winning immunity for this challenge, Suede's design was manufactured and sold on Bluefly.com.
- ^Note 2: Instead of winning immunity for this challenge, Keith's design will be worn by Brooke Shields on the second season of Lipstick Jungle.
- ^Note 3: Instead of winning immunity for this challenge, Leanne's design was manufactured and sold to American Express cardholders.
- ^Note 4: From this challenge onward, immunity was no longer given to the winners of each challenge. This episode also featured a double elimination.
- ^Note 5: All 4 of the remaining designers will create collections for New York Fashion Week, but only 3 designers will actually be showing their collections at Fashion Week.

The designer won Project Runway season 5.
The designer won that challenge.
Teal background and ADV means the designer advanced to Fashion Week.
The designer came in second but did not win the challenge.
The designer had one of the highest scores for that challenge, but did not win.
The designer had one of the lowest scores for that challenge, but was not eliminated.
The designer was in the bottom two, but was not eliminated.
The designer lost and was out of the competition.

Model elimination chart
| Contestants | 1 | 2 | 3 | 4 | 5 | 6 | 7 | 8 | 9 | 10 | 11^{3} | 12 | 13^{4} | 14 |
|---|---|---|---|---|---|---|---|---|---|---|---|---|---|---|
| Tia | SU | SU | SU | SU | SU | SU | SU | SU | SU | SU | LM | LM | LM | WINNER (LM) |
| Katarina | KT | KT | KT | KT | KT | KT | KT | KT | KT | KT | KT | KT | KT | KT |
| Topacio | JD | JF | JF | JF | JF | JF | JF | JF | JF | JF | KC | KC | KC | KC |
| Nicole | JT | JS | JS | JS | JS | JS | JS | JS | JS | JS | JS | JS | JS | OUT |
| Xaviera | TS | TS | TS | TS | TS | TS | TS | TS | TS | – | SU | OUT | | |
| Germaine | KL | KL | KL | KL | KL | – | KC^{2} | KC | KC | KC | OUT | | | |
| Karalyn | LM | LM | LM | LM | LM | LM | LM | LM | LM | LM | OUT | | | |
| Polina | BW | BW | BW | BW | BW | BW | BW | BW | BW | – | OUT | | | |
| Kendall | SZ | SZ | SZ | SZ | SZ | SZ | SZ | SZ | OUT | | | | | |
| Alyssa | WN | WN | KB^{1} | KB | KB | KB | KB | OUT | | | | | | |
| Elena | DF | DF | DF | DF | DF | DF | OUT | | | | | | | |
| Shannone | KC | KC | KC | KC | KC | KC | WD^{2} | | | | | | | |
| Alex | JS | JD | JD | JD | OUT | | | | | | | | | |
| Leslie | EB | EB | EB | OUT | | | | | | | | | | |
| Runa | KB | KB | WD^{1} | | | | | | | | | | | |
| Bell | JF | OUT | | | | | | | | | | | | |

- ^Note 1: Alyssa was originally eliminated, but was brought back after Runa withdrew from the competition.
- ^Note 2: Germaine was originally eliminated, but was brought back after Shannone withdrew from the competition.
- ^Note 3: Due to the number of designers eliminated in the previous two episodes, the remaining designers were allowed to re-pick their models for this challenge.
- ^Note 4: Karalyn, Shannone, Polina and Alex were used in this challenge to show off the designers' bridesmaid dresses. However, they will not be in contention for the finale win.

Light green background means the model won Project Runway.
Blue background means the model wore the winning design that challenge.
Red background means the model wore the losing design that challenge.
Grey background means the model was eliminated.
The model was brought back into the competition.
The model withdrew from the competition.

Designer legend

- Blayne Walsh: BW
- Daniel Feld: DF
- Emily Brandle: EB
- Jennifer Diederich: JD
- Jerell Scott: JS
- Jerry Tam: JT
- Joe Faris: JF
- Keith Bryce: KB
- Kelli Martin: KL
- Kenley Collins: KC
- Korto Momolu: KT
- Leanne Marshall: LM
- Stella Zotis: SZ
- Suede: SU
- Terri Stevens: TS
- Wesley Nault: WN

== Episodes ==
=== Episode 1: Let's Start from the Beginning ===
Repeating the first challenge on season 1 of Project Runway, the designers were asked to create a look using only materials purchased from a Gristedes grocery store. The designers were given 30 minutes and $75 to shop for items, and then one day to complete the outfit. Most designers were criticized by mentor Tim Gunn for utilizing fabric-substitutes such as tablecloths in their looks, which wasn't what the challenge was about. The winner received immunity for the next challenge. The guest judge, Austin Scarlett, competed on Season 1 of Project Runway and won this same challenge with a dress made of corn husks.

- Judges: Heidi Klum, Nina Garcia, Michael Kors
- Guest Judge: Austin Scarlett
- WINNER: Kelli
- OUT: Jerry
- First Aired: July 16, 2008

=== Episode 2: Grass Is Always Greener ===
The designers were asked to create a cocktail dress with their models as their clients. They were asked to use environmentally friendly or conscious fabrics from Mood, with their models doing the fabric selections without their consultations. They were given $75 and one day to finish their garments. The winner did not receive immunity, but did get to sell their garment on Bluefly.

- Judges: Heidi Klum, Nina Garcia, Michael Kors
- Guest Judge: Natalie Portman
- WINNER: Suede
- OUT: Wesley
- First Aired: July 23, 2008

=== Episode 3: Bright Lights/Big City ===
The designers were tasked to create a look of their choice inspired by the vibrant nightlife of New York City. Tim Gunn drove the designers around the city via a sightseeing tour bus, then provided them with digital cameras to take photographs of their inspiration. Four groups of designers were dropped off at different stops and had an hour to take their photos. They were given $100 and one day to complete their design. The winner received immunity for the next challenge.

The four groups and their assigned stopovers are as follows:

- **Suede**, **Daniel**, **Leanne**, and **Jennifer** at Columbus Circle.
- **Blayne**, **Keith**, **Stella**, and **Kenley** at Times Square.
- **Korto**, **Joe**, and **Kelli** at the New York Public Library.
- **Terri**, **Jerell**, and **Emily** at Greenwich Village.

- Judges: Heidi Klum, Nina Garcia, Michael Kors
- Guest Judge: Sandra Bernhard
- WINNER: Kenley
- OUT: Emily
- First Aired: July 30, 2008

=== Episode 4: Rings of Glory ===
The designers were brought to the Armory Track and Field Training Center by their mentor, Tim Gunn, and were introduced to U.S. Olympian and speed skater Apolo Anton Ohno. Their next challenge was to design a womenswear look for the 2008 Summer Olympics Opening Ceremonies. They were given 30 minutes to sketch and draw inspiration from the National Track and Field Museum, after which they were given $150 and one day to complete their designs. The winner received immunity for the next challenge.

- Judges: Heidi Klum, Nina Garcia, Michael Kors
- Guest Judge: Apolo Anton Ohno
- WINNER: Korto
- OUT: Jennifer
- First Aired: August 6, 2008

=== Episode 5: Welcome to the Jungle ===
Working in teams of two, designers were asked to make an outfit that could transition from day to night for Brooke Shields's character Wendy Healy on the television show Lipstick Jungle. The winning design was to be worn by Brooke Shields on Season 2 of Lipstick Jungle. Each team was given a budget of $150 and one day to complete their designs. After sketching individually for 30 minutes and pitching their ideas to Shields, six designers were picked by Brooke as team leaders (team leaders shown in bold below). The team leaders were picked in a random order and selected a teammate.

- **Blayne** and Leanne
- **Keith** and Kenley
- **Terri** and Suede
- **Korto** and Joe
- **Kelli** and Daniel
- **Jerell** and Stella

The winner did not receive immunity for the next challenge.

- Judges: Heidi Klum, Nina Garcia, Michael Kors
- Guest Judge: Brooke Shields
- WINNER: Keith (teamed with Kenley Collins)
- OUT: Kelli (teamed with Daniel Feld)
- First Aired: August 13, 2008

=== Episode 6: Good Queen Fun ===
The designers were asked to make an outfit for a drag queen. Chris March of season 4 made a guest appearance to deliver the challenge. The designers were picked at random to select which drag queen to work with. They were given $200 to shop for supplies and two days to complete their designs. The winner received immunity for the next challenge. The designers' models were not used in this challenge.

Designers and Drag Queens:

- Blayne with Miss Understood
- Daniel with Annida Greenkard
- Jerrell with LeMay
- Joe with Varla Jean Merman
- Keith with Sherry Vine
- Kenley with Farrah Moans*
- Korto with Sweetie
- Leanne with Sharon Needles*
- Stella with Luisa Verde
- Suede with Hedda Lettuce
- Terri with Acid Betty

- Judges: Heidi Klum, Nina Garcia, Michael Kors
- Guest Judge: RuPaul
- special guest Chris March
- WINNER: Joe
- OUT: Daniel
- First Aired: August 20, 2008

Note: Sharon Needles and Farrah Moans have no connection to the Queens who appeared on seasons 4 and 9 (respectively) of RuPaul's Drag Race. Acid Betty, on the other hand, participated on the eighth season of the show.

=== Episode 7: Fashion That Drives You ===
The designers were required to make an outfit made entirely out of the spare parts and raw materials from a Saturn hybrid car. They were told to walk to 142 West 31st Street in Manhattan. After taking an elevator to the roof of the building, they were instructed to collect as much of the recycled car parts from within the parked Saturn vehicles. They had four minutes to collect the materials and one day to complete their outfits. The winner received immunity for the next challenge.

- Judges: Heidi Klum, Michael Kors
- Guest judges: Laura Bennett (sitting in for Nina Garcia), Rachel Zoe
- WINNER: Leanne
- OUT: Keith
- First Aired: August 27, 2008

=== Episode 8: Double 0 Fashion ===
The designers were taken to the Meatpacking District and brought to the offices and design showroom of living fashion legend and current CFDA president, designer Diane von Fürstenberg. Their challenge was to create a look for her Fall 2008 collection inspired by the movie A Foreign Affair, starring screen legend Marlene Dietrich. They were given free rein and 15 minutes inside Diane von Fürstenberg's fabric sample room to select fabrics for their designs. The winning garment was produced in limited quantities and exclusively sold to American Express cardholders, with proceeds going to the CFDA Foundation. The winner did not receive immunity for the next challenge.

- Judges: Heidi Klum, Michael Kors
- Guest judge: Fern Mallis (sitting in for Nina Garcia), Diane von Fürstenberg
- WINNER: Leanne
- OUT: Stella
- First Aired: September 3, 2008

Note: The theme of this episode is the movie "A Foreign Affair." DVF states it is a Marlene Dietrich movie from the 1930s, taking place in Berlin & Shanghai. Dietrich plays a spy. DVF is in error. She combined TWO Dietrich movies - "Shanghai Express" and 'A Foreign Affair". The first takes place in 1930s China on a train, trying to get to Shanghai. Dietrich places the famous Shanghai Lil. The second takes place in Berlin, 1948, and Dietrich plays a nightclub singer who may or may not have been a Nazi collaborator.

=== Episode 9: What's Your Sign? ===
The designers teamed up in pairs with eliminated designers to create an avant-garde garment around one of the two astrological signs of their group. They had one day and 8 hours to complete the look. The night before the runway, they were brought to the American Museum of Natural History in New York. There the designers were greeted with surprise guest appearances of former Project Runway designers and winners Kara Janx, Alison Kelly, Jay McCarroll, Robert Plotkin, Christian Siriano, Daniel Vosovic, & Carmen Webber, who all voted on a winning look. This episode featured a surprise double elimination & the winner no longer had the advantage of immunity going forward.

Teams:

- **Blayne** and Stella (Libra)
- **Jerell** and Jennifer (Sagittarius)
- **Joe** and Daniel (Aries)
- **Kenley** and Wesley (Aquarius)
- **Korto** and Kelli (Aquarius)
- **Leanne** and Emily (Scorpio)
- **Suede** and Jerry (Libra)
- **Terri** and Keith (Leo)

- Judges: Heidi Klum, Nina Garcia, Michael Kors
- Guest judge: Francisco Costa
- WINNER: Jerell (teamed with Jennifer Diederich)
- OUT: Blayne (teamed with Stella Zotis) and Terri (teamed with Keith Bryce)
- First Aired: September 10, 2008

=== Episode 10: Transformation ===
The designers were assigned recent college graduates and were given the task of giving them a fashion makeover to help them enter the workforce. Each designer was to gear their look to their client's specific profession, whilst keeping their style and pleasing both the clients and their mothers. The clients wore the outfits down the runway; the models were not used in this challenge.

- Judges: Heidi Klum, Nina Garcia, Michael Kors
- Guest judge: Cynthia Rowley
- WINNER: Jerell
- OUT: Joe
- First Aired: September 17, 2008

=== Episode 11: Rock N' Runway ===
The designers were given the task of designing for each other. The looks were to be inspired by different genres of music. The designers wore their outfits down the runway; the models were not used for this challenge.

Teams (Designers names are in bold; genre applies to teammate):

- **Jerell** designed for Kenley (Pop music)
- **Kenley** designed for Leanne (Hip hop music)
- **Leanne** designed for Korto (Country music)
- **Korto** designed for Suede (Punk rock)
- **Suede** designed for Jerell (Rock and roll)

- Judges: Heidi Klum, Nina Garcia, Michael Kors
- Guest judge: LL Cool J
- WINNER: Korto
- OUT: Suede
- First Aired: September 24, 2008

=== Episode 12: Nature Calls ===
Drawing inspiration from nature, the remaining designers headed to the New York Botanical Garden to design an evening gown.

- Judges: Heidi Klum, Nina Garcia, Michael Kors
- Guest Judge: Georgina Chapman
- WINNER: Jerell
- OUT: None: (However, all four are on the elimination block when the final three are determined in the next episode).
- First Aired: October 1, 2008

=== Episode 13: Finale, Part 1 ===
The designers were given the task, prior to leaving to create their collections, of creating a wedding dress for their collections. In addition to the wedding dress, they were judged on an 11th look, a bridesmaid dress to go with it. This is the first time that all of the finalists were of the same gender (female).

- Judges: Heidi Klum, Nina Garcia, Michael Kors
- FINALISTS: Kenley, Korto, and Leanne
- OUT: Jerell
- First Aired: October 8, 2008

=== Episode 14: Finale, Part 2 ===
Prior to the runway show, the finalists, who each had twelve outfits ready for the runway, were informed that they would only be able to show ten, forcing last minute editing of their collections. The guest judge was originally scheduled to be Jennifer Lopez, but she was unable to participate due to a foot injury and was replaced by Tim Gunn. Following the presentation of all three collections, the judges stated that Leanne Marshall had created the best collection and named her the winner of Season 5 of Project Runway.

- Judges: Heidi Klum, Nina Garcia, Michael Kors
- Guest judge: Tim Gunn
- First Aired: October 15, 2008
- WINNER of Project Runway Season 5: Leanne Marshall
- OUT: Korto Momolu (1st Runner-Up), Kenley Collins (2nd Runner-Up)

== Reception ==
Elizabeth Hammon of The Decatur Daily up to mid-August 2008 found the overall first third of the season boring and recycled from previous seasons, noting that the season had not "taken off yet" and that "good stuff is yet to come." She also named Harvard-educated actress Natalie Portman "the worst guest" of all time to that point for being "clearly clueless" about fashion. She also found the challenge about dresses made for Portman the "less-interesting version of Daniel Vosovic's orchid-inspired garment" from the second season.

| Preceded by Season 4 | Project Runway; Season 5 | Succeeded by Season 6 |
| Preceded by Christian Siriano | Project Runway winner Leanne Marshall | Succeeded by Irina Shabayeva |
| Preceded by Christian Siriano | Fan Favorite; Korto Momolu | Succeeded by Christopher Straub |
