= Kara Saun =

American fashion and costume designer

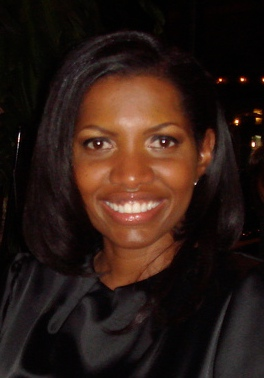
- Saun in 2008
- Born: (1967)
- Occupations: Fashion and costume designer

Kara Saun is an American fashion and costume designer best known for first competing in the first season of the American reality television series Project Runway.

== Early life and education ==
Kara Saun grew up in South Carolina, where she participated in Girl Scouts. She gained interest in fashion design while attending a junior high school in Sumter, South Carolina. She graduated from Rutgers University, near where her sister and her parents' relatives lived at the time. Saun's parents grew up in the Cape May area of New Jersey and then moved to Sumter. Her father served for the United States Army, and her sister served for the United States Navy.

== Pre-Project Runway activities ==
After Rutgers, Saun started her fashion career working for a lingerie manufacturer. She then started her career as a costume designer with Malcolm in the Middle. She also designed clothes for other television shows, like Malcolm & Eddie, Eve, and the first iteration (1999–2001) of The Queen Latifah Show, and designed Queen Latifah's red carpet dress for the 72nd Academy Awards (2000). She designed clothes for also her loyal customers, like Eddie Griffin. She also designed costumes for both 2003 films Baadasssss! and Gang of Roses, the latter a Western-themed film "with a hip hop edge".

== Project Runway season 1 (2004–05) ==
=== Before the finale ===
Saun, a 37-year-old fashion designer of Los Angeles without formal training in a design school, first competed in the very first season of Project Runway. For the second challenge of the first season, whose dresses must represent the "envy" theme, Saun designed a green dress inspired by "her background as an 'Air Force brat' ". She selected the green color to connect "war with envy" and won the challenge.

For the eighth challenge in which a USPS postal uniform should be redesigned, Saun made a "winter uniform with a turtleneck sweater, a lined vest and drawstring pants" and then won the challenge. Her work up to January 2005 had received praise from the series's mentor Tim Gunn via the series's official website. Amy DiLuna of New York Daily News the following month also praised her work seen in the series. Until the Fashion Week, she had been praised for her consistency and won four out of nine total challenges this season.

=== During the finale ===
For the Fashion Week, Saun designed her collection representing femininity and utilitarianism and inspired by The Aviator, a 2004 biographical film about Howard Hughes. Included in the collection were " 'aviatrix' leather pants and a fuchsia cracked patent-leather flight jacket" as well as other "intricately cut leather pieces, fur shrugs and jackets, and a series of glamorous gowns". (The title of her collection alternated between "Fantasy Fly-Girl" and "The Aviatrix".)

Controversially, Saun had Dollhouse Shoes design the custom-made shoes without charge for her Fashion Week collection. Under contract, the participating contestants were not allowed to be assisted gratis whatsoever. Thus, the producers instructed the judges to exclude those shoes from judging evaluation if she were to use them, which she did, and her attempt to pay the designers $15 per pair failed to make the producers reconsider. She became the first runner-up to eventually winner Jay McCarroll.

Several clothes of Saun's Fashion Week collection (alongside several others of McCarroll's and of Pepper's) were auctioned off via the series's official website when the auction ended on March 2, 2005. The auction sales were donated to Dress for Success.

=== As a black contestant on television ===
When the series originally aired, Saun was perceived as "the most level-headed and talented of all the contestants" this season and, a black Project Runway contestant herself, unlike other African-American contestants of other competitive reality television shows who at the time were portrayed negatively and perceived to generate "more drama than white contestants", like black contestants in The Apprentice. Jill Radsken of Boston Herald in December 2005 described Saun as "a slightly gentler" version of The Apprentice's Omarosa Manigault Newman as opposed to the portrayal of Zulema Griffin in the second season, which Redsken described as "the fashion stereotype of the bitchy black character" as intended by the producers.

Up to the seventh season, no black contestant had won Project Runway. Besides Saun, a first runner-up herself, two out of four other black non-winning finalists were first runners-up. Furthermore, as LaMont Jones of New Pittsburgh Courier noted, to that point, none of permanent judges were black, and rarely a black guest judge made an appearance.

== Post-Project Runway activities ==
After Project Runway, Saun designed clothes for the fourth season (2005–06) of a sitcom What I Like About You and another reality television series R U the Girl. She also designed thirteen gold metallic leather dresses for contestants to wear as part of promoting the fifth season of America's Next Top Model. She also designed other clothes for pilots of other WB and UPN shows and of an ABC sitcom Notes from the Underbelly. She alongside Wendy Pepper and Austin Scarlett made a cameo appearance in Project Jay, an hourlong documentary about Project Runway winner Jay McCarroll, which aired on Bravo on February 22, 2006.

With financial assistance from a Connecticut angel investor, Saun launched her evening wear collection at Los Angeles Fashion Week in March 2006. To help her build the collection, the investor gave Saun an investment in low hundreds of thousands of dollars. Under contract, the investor would control some equity, while Saun would fully control her creativity and business operations. A few clothing stores by July of the same year sold her clothes of that collection. By November 2007, her "line of gowns and cocktail dresses" were sold in boutiques located in California, New York, Texas, and Connecticut as well as via her own official website, starting from US$1,500 ($2,330 in 2025)

Saun further designed costumes for an MTV series America's Best Dance Crew as of October 2008; for the Collective, a Nashville-based a cappella band who competed in the third season (2011) of The Sing-Off; and for the first three films of the Disney Channel's Descendants franchise: the first film (2015), Descendants 2 (2017), and Descendants 3 (2019).

Saun was one of fourteen returnees re-competing in the all-returnees twentieth season (2023) of the main Project Runway series. By then, as Anne MacKinnon-Welsh of The Washington Post noted, a number of judges of color had increased to this point, and younger black contestants and black judges had seen Saun and Korto Momolu as their role models and primary reasons for pursuing their own fashion careers.
