= Wendy Pepper =

American fashion designer

- Born: Anne Eustis Pepper; August 23, 1964; Dayton, Ohio, U.S.
- Died: November 12, 2017 (aged 53); Washington D.C., U.S.
- Other name: Anne Eustis Pepper Stewart
- Occupation: Fashion designer
- Known for: Project Runway season 1 (3rd place)
- Spouse: Robert Downing (div. 2006)
- Children: 1

Anne Eustis Pepper Stewart (August 23, 1964 – November 12, 2017), known as Wendy Pepper, was a fashion designer best known for finishing third and becoming the second runner-up in the first season (2004–05) of the American reality television series Project Runway. She also made other television appearances, like the second season (2012) of Project Runway All Stars.

== Early life and education ==
Pepper was born in Dayton, Ohio, to her mother Anne Livingston Emmet and father Charles Willing Pepper and then raised in Washington, D. C. She had three brothers and a sister. She graduated from the Potomac School and the Madeira School. Furthermore, she earned her degree in anthropology from the University of Washington and previously resided in Nepal.

== Project Runway season 1 (2004–05) ==
=== The beginning ===
Pepper, a 39-year-old mother and wife, competed in the first season of Project Runway. Due to being the oldest female contestant of the season and a mother, Pepper earned her nickname "The Longshot". When the series was filming in that summer, she turned forty. After making two critically-panned dresses in the season's first two episodes, in the following (third) episode, her holiday cocktail dress—"a navy empire-waist silk tank dress with a two-button capelet"—was the highest-scored in the cocktail dress challenge primarily because it was considerably easier to manufacture than Jay McCarroll's "Art Deco-inspired" one (highly praised by the judges), leading the series's sponsor Banana Republic to produce Pepper's dress.

In late December 2004, all two hundred units of Pepper's winning cocktail dress, priced US$188 ($320 in 2025), were then sold online and, for two days, at select Banana Republic stores as a "limited edition" for the company's winter collection. The dress ran out of stock online within three hours after its availability. Sales of the dress were donated to Dress for Success, a nonprofit organization intended to help low-income women prepare for employment. On February 9, 2005, Pepper auctioned off one of remaining copies of her winning cocktail dress alongside a handbag designed for the dress and a donated third-party jewelry all together for US$1,750 ($2,880 in 2025) to benefit Project HOPE's tsunami relief fundraiser, hosted by the Middleburg Business and Professional Association at the Middleburg Community Center. The local fundraiser overall garnered US$29,000 ($48,000 in 2025).

=== Midway ===
As the season progressed, Pepper's methods to become one of the three finalists, exemplified by her responses to the judges about other contestants in jeopardy, and her overall talent had met the ire of other contestants and viewers, especially those interested in primarily fashion. Surveyed by The Philadelphia Inquirer, thirteen Drexel University students, some of them graduates, unanimously found her "conniving" and manipulative and did not want her to become a finalist. Mediaweek magazine named her an emerging "bona fide villain". Chicago Tribune cited Pepper's motherliness as her disguise and lambasting other contestants' works for her two-facedness.

=== Becoming a finalist ===
When she became one of the season's four remaining contestants, Women's Wear Daily considered Pepper "clearly the weakest of the bunch" and described her then-planned "Thrill of the Hunt" collection for the season's then-upcoming New York Fashion Week as "too many bustier and corset looks." Up to this point, the judges had found her "sensible" works usually "dowdy and matronly". Nonetheless, in the penultimate red carpet dress challenge, the judges, especially Access Hollywood co-host Nancy O'Dell, selected Pepper's dress for O'Dell to wear at the 47th Annual Grammy Awards (February 13, 2005), making Pepper one of the three finalists, much to dismay of contestants and viewers who wanted an eliminated contestant and fan favorite Austin Scarlett to be a finalist. By February 2005, Pepper received at least two hundred emails praising her, and her official website received over three thousand visits. In the reunion episode, she displayed her dyed hair and did not wear glasses.

In the Fashion Week, the runway clothes of Pepper's collection "The Thrill of the Hunt" used colors representing autumn—green, brown, red—and features like "feather trims and corset tops". The judges found Pepper to have "lacked focus and a distinct voice" and been less consistent throughout the season, noted Penelope M. Carrington of Richmond Times-Dispatch. One of judges Michael Kors praised Pepper's tailoring but found her collection to be "out of step for her". She became the second runner-up by being eliminated before the other two finalists—the first runner-up Kara Saun and the season's winner Jay McCarroll.

=== Aftermath ===
Several clothes of Pepper's Fashion Week collection (alongside several others of Saun's and of McCarroll's) were auctioned off via the series's official website by 9 p.m. Eastern on March 2, 2005, when the auction ended. The auction sales were donated to Dress for Success. Pepper told The Washington Post in February 2005 that she planned to remain and establish a business in Middleburg rather than move to New York City or Los Angeles, regardless of the season's results.

=== Reception ===
Clifford Pugh of Toronto Star in October 2006 wrote that the series Project Runway emphasized more "on brash personalities", like Pepper and Santino Rice, and less on talent.

== Post-Project Runway activities ==
After Project Runway, Pepper opened her first fashion store in Middleburg in spring 2005. She also participated in Battle of the Network Reality Stars, which premiered on August 17, 2005, as part of the "light blue" team, which finished last in one challenge. She became one of the "light blue" teammates eliminated. She also won a poker round in Celebrity Poker Showdown that same year, qualifying her for the Championship round. She then lost the Championship round of the tournament to actor Steven Culp.

Pepper reappeared briefly in the second season premiere of Project Runway, which aired in late 2005, among the panel judging auditions. She alongside Kara Saun and Austin Scarlett made a cameo appearance in Project Jay, an hourlong documentary about Project Runway winner Jay McCarroll, which aired on Bravo on February 22, 2006. In 2012, she re-competed in the second season of Project Runway All Stars and became the second returnee eliminated from the season.

== Personal life ==
Pepper had a daughter Finley M. Stewart (born 1999 or 2000) and a husband Robert Downing, a carpenter whom she divorced by no later than January 2006 after Project Runway.

== Death ==
Pepper died at age 53 in Middleburg, Virginia, on November 12, 2017, from complications of pneumonia after several months of having suffered from cancer. Her memorial was held at Christ Church (Georgetown, Washington, D.C.), on December 1, 2017.

== Selected filmography ==
- Project Runway season 1 (2004–05), contestant – third place, second runner-up
- Battle of the Network Reality Stars (2005)
- Celebrity Poker Showdown (2005), poker player – finalist
- Project Runway All Stars season 2 (2012), returnee – eliminated in the second episode
