= Kelli Martin =

American fashion designer

- Education: Fashion Institute of Design & Merchandising
- Occupation: fashion designer
- Television: Project Runway Season 5 (12th place)

Kelli Martin is an American fashion designer. She was a contestant on the fifth season of the Bravo television series Project Runway.

== Education and background ==
Martin, a native of Columbus, Ohio, graduated from Westland High School in 1998 and Fashion Institute of Design & Merchandising in Los Angeles, California in 2001. After finishing a degree in fashion design, Martin completed the Advanced Fashion Design program at FIDM on a scholarship from Bob Mackie in 2004.

== Fashion design career ==
Martin created her Anti-Label fashion line in 1998, and beginning in 2000 she sold a number of her original Anti-Label designs on the online auction site eBay. After leaving Los Angeles in 2006 and moving back to her hometown she opened her own storefront boutique, Black Market.

In an April 2008 interview, Martin said of her aesthetic, "I like really feminine silhouettes and form-fitting throwbacks to, like, the vintage pinup girls, but I like raw edges..."

=== Project Runway ===
Season five of Project Runway began with "Let's Start from the Beginning," which first aired on July 16, 2008. Contestant designers were tasked with creating a sexy, glamorous outfit for a night on the town, but were only allowed to use materials purchased from a Manhattan supermarket called Gristedes. Martin won this challenge, which was judged in part by guest judge Austin Scarlett.

Martin was eliminated after the fifth challenge, "Welcome to the Jungle," when she and her teammate Daniel were assigned the task of designing a look for Brooke Shields to wear on Season 2 of Lipstick Jungle. The judges questioned her taste and made her the fifth person eliminated from the competition. She came back with other eliminated designers in the ninth challenge to assist the remaining contestants in creating an avant garde design inspired by their zodiac signs.
