= Project Runway season 1 =

Project Runway
- Season 1
- Region 1 DVD cover
- No. of tasks: 10
- No. of contestants: 12
- Winner: Jay McCarroll
- No. of episodes: 11

Release
- Original network: Bravo
- Original release: December 1, 2004 – February 23, 2005

Season chronology
- Next → Season 2

The first season of Project Runway, Bravo's reality competition show for fashion designers, premiered on December 1, 2004. The season received critical acclaim including an Emmy nomination for outstanding competitive reality series. Growth in audience popularity was also dramatic from its debut to the season finale, making it a sleeper hit. Project Runway gave Bravo one of its most successful series since Queer Eye for the Straight Guy.

The winning designer of the first season was Pennsylvania-based designer Jay McCarroll. As his prize for winning the competition among 12 designers, McCarroll won a one year contract with designers management agency (a company that represents the business interest of fashion designers), $100,000, a mentorship with Banana Republic to aid in developing his own fashion label, and a feature of his work in the American edition of ELLE magazine. The winning model of the first season, selected by McCarroll, was Julia Beynon. McCarroll later turned down both the $100,000 and the mentorship with Banana Republic, stating that the prizes came with too much contractual baggage.

Austin Scarlett later appeared in Project Runway All Stars in 2012, where he finished runner-up. Wendy Pepper, in the same year, competed in the second season of the All Stars edition placing 12th out of 13. In 2016, Daniel Franco competed in the fifth season of the All Stars edition, placing 12th out of 13. In 2023, Nora Pagel and Kara Saun appeared in the twentieth season with Nora placing 14th and Kara placing 7th out of 14.

== Contestants ==
| Contestant | Age | Hometown | Finish | Outcome |
|---|---|---|---|---|
| Daniel Franco | 28 | Los Angeles, California | Episode 1 | 12th place |
| Mario Cadenas | 23 | Miami, Florida | Episode 2 | 11th place |
| Starr Ilzhoefer | 27 | Charlotte, North Carolina | Episode 3 | 10th place |
| Vanessa Riley | 34 | Houston, Texas | Episode 4 | 9th place |
| Nora Caliguri | 21 | Cheshire, Connecticut | Episode 5 | 8th place |
| Alexandra Vidal | 22 | Miami, Florida | Episode 6 | 7th place |
| Kevin Johnn | 44 | New York, New York | Episode 7 | 6th place |
| Robert Plotkin | 28 | New York, New York | Episode 8 | 5th place |
| Austin Scarlett | 23 | New York, New York | Episode 9 | 4th place |
| Wendy Pepper † | 39 | Middleburg, Virginia | Episode 11 | 3rd place |
| Kara Saun | 37 | Los Angeles, California | Episode 11 | Runner-up |
| Jay McCarroll | 29 | Dallas, Pennsylvania | Episode 11 | Winner |

The 12 models competing for an ELLE spread in the first season were:

| Model | Age | Hometown | Outcome |
|---|---|---|---|
| Mary Henderson | 19 | Texas | 12th place |
| Alison Zebelian | 19 | Michigan | 11th place |
| Josiane Barboza | 21 | Brazil | 10th place |
| Audrey Chihocky | 18 | Virginia | 9th place |
| Joy Pursell | 21 | Texas | 8th place |
| Morgan Quinn | 21 | Iowa | 7th place |
| Erin Denardo | 21 | New Jersey | 6th place |
| Olga Kononova | 18 | Czech Republic | 5th place |
| Martinique Mitchell | 21 | California | 4th place |
| Melissa Haro | 17 | California | 3rd place |
| Jenny Toth | 22 | Ohio | Runner-up |
| Julia Beynon | 20 | California | Winner |

== Challenges ==
Elimination Chart
| Designers | 1 | 2 | 3 | 4^{1} | 5 | 6 | 7 | 8 | 9 | 11 | Eliminated Episode |
|---|---|---|---|---|---|---|---|---|---|---|---|
| Jay | IN | IN | HIGH | IN | HIGH | HIGH | HIGH | HIGH | LOW | WINNER | 10 – Finale |
| Kara | IN | WIN | IN | IN | WIN | IN | WIN | WIN | LOW | RUNNER-UP | 10 – Finale |
| Wendy | LOW | LOW | WIN | LOW | IN | LOW | LOW | LOW | WIN | 3RD PLACE | 10 – Finale |
| Austin | WIN | IN | LOW | LOW | LOW | WIN | LOW | LOW | OUT | | 9 – Design for the Red Carpet |
| Robert | IN | HIGH | LOW | IN | IN | HIGH | HIGH | OUT | | | 8 – Postal Uniform Challenge |
| Kevin | IN | IN | IN | WIN | IN | LOW | OUT | | | | 7 – Design a Collection |
| Alexandra | IN | IN | HIGH | HIGH | IN | OUT | | | | | 6 – Making a Splash |
| Nora | HIGH | LOW | IN | LOW | OUT | | | | | | 5 – "Model" Clients |
| Vanessa | HIGH | IN | IN | OUT | | | | | | | 4 – Collaboration |
| Starr | LOW | LOW | OUT | | | | | | | | 3 – Commercial Appeal |
| Mario | IN | OUT | | | | | | | | | 2 – Vision |
| Daniel | OUT | | | | | | | | | | 1 – Innovation |

Results
The designer won Project Runway Season 1.
The designer won that challenge.
The designer had the second highest score for that challenge.
The designer had one of the highest scores for that challenge, but did not win.
The designer had one of the lowest scores for that challenge, but was not eliminated.
The designer was in the bottom two, but was not eliminated.
The designer lost and was out of the competition.

^Note 1: Although Nora's team was voted the best, the judges thought that Nora's teamwork was very poor, therefore she was placed in the bottom two.

== Rate The Runway ==
Elimination Chart
| Designers | 1 | 2 | 3 | 4 | 5 | 6 | 7 | 8 | 9 | 10 |
|---|---|---|---|---|---|---|---|---|---|---|
| Jay | IN | HIGH | HIGH | IN | IN | LOW | WIN | HIGH | HIGH | WINNER |
| Kara | IN | WIN | IN | IN | HIGH | HIGH | HIGH | WIN | WIN | RUNNER-UP |
| Wendy | IN | IN | WIN | LOW | HIGH | LOW | LOW | LOW | OUT | 3RD PLACE |
| Austin | WIN | HIGH | LOW | LOW | OUT | WIN | HIGH | LOW | LOW | |
| Robert | HIGH | IN | LOW | IN | WIN | HIGH | OUT | OUT | | |
| Kevin | IN | IN | IN | WIN | LOW | OUT | LOW | | | |
| Alexandra | IN | IN | HIGH | HIGH | IN | IN | | | | |
| Nora | HIGH | IN | IN | HIGH | LOW | | | | | |
| Vanessa | IN | LOW | IN | OUT | | | | | | |
| Starr | LOW | LOW | OUT | | | | | | | |
| Mario | LOW | OUT | | | | | | | | |
| Daniel | OUT | | | | | | | | | |

== Models ==
Elimination Chart
| Model | 1 | 2 | 3 | 4 | 5 | 6 | 7 | 8 | 9 | 10 | Finale |
|---|---|---|---|---|---|---|---|---|---|---|---|
| Julia | AV | AV | JM | AS | AS | JM | JM | JM | JM | JM | WINNER |
| Jenny | JM | KJ | NC | KS | KS | KS | KS | KS | KS | KS | KS |
| Melissa | RP | RP | AS | KJ | NC | AS | WP | WP | WP | WP | WP |
| Martinique | KJ | AS | KS | AV | RP | WP | KJ | AS | AS | OUT | |
| Olga | AS | MC | KJ | VR | KJ | RP | RP | RP | OUT | | |
| Erin | MC | WP | AV | JM | AV | AV | AS | OUT | | | |
| Morgan | KS | VR | VR | WP | JM | KJ | OUT | | | | |
| Joy | VR | NC | SI | NC | WP | OUT | | | | | |
| Audrey | SI | SI | WP | RP | OUT | | | | | | |
| Josiane | WP | KS | RP | OUT | | | | | | | |
| Alison | NC | JM | OUT | | | | | | | | |
| Mary | DF | OUT | | | | | | | | | |

The model was the winner of Project Runway Season 1
The model wore the winning designer's outfit
The model wore the losing designer's outfit
The model was eliminated

Notes:

- Designers chose their models prior to each challenge, with the winner of the previous challenge choosing first and the other designers choosing in random order. The model who was not chosen would be eliminated.
- Since models are eliminated at the beginning of the next episode, no model was eliminated in episode 1.
- There are only 10 sections for models instead of 11 because no models were out in the reunion episode.
- During Episode 8, while Jay had selected Julia, she was unable to attend the runway showing. Austin walked in her place.

Designer legend

- Alexandra Vidal: AV
- Austin Scarlett: AS
- Daniel Franco: DF
- Jay McCarroll: JM
- Kara Saun: KS
- Kevin Johnn: KJ
- Mario Cadenas: MC
- Nora Caliguri: NC
- Robert Plotkin: RP
- Starr Ilzhoefer: SI
- Vanessa Riley: VR
- Wendy Pepper: WP

== Episodes ==
=== Episode 1: Innovation ===
Original airdate: December 1, 2004

Designers created a sexy, glamorous outfit for a night on the town made only from materials bought at a Manhattan supermarket. The designers had a budget of $50 and one hour to make their purchases. They had one day to complete the design and the winner had immunity for the next challenge and could not be eliminated.

- Judges: Heidi Klum, Nina Garcia, Michael Kors
- Guest Judge: Patricia Field.

WINNER: Austin
ELIMINATED: Daniel

=== Episode 2: Vision ===
Original airdate: December 8, 2004

Designers used plain white cotton jersey to build a garment that conveys "envy." They had a budget of $50 and one day to complete the design.

- Judges: Heidi Klum, Nina Garcia, Michael Kors
- Guest Judges: Constance White (sitting in for Michael Kors), Paul Berman

WINNER: Kara
ELIMINATED: Mario

=== Episode 3: Commercial Appeal ===
Original airdate: December 15, 2004

Designers created a holiday dress to fit with Banana Republic's current line. They had to pick their fabrics at the studios and had two days to complete their designs.

- Judges: Heidi Klum, Nina Garcia, Michael Kors
- Guest Judge: Deborah Lloyd

WINNER: Wendy
ELIMINATED: Starr

=== Episode 4: Collaboration ===
Original airdate: January 5, 2005

The designers created a new look for rising rock star Sarah Hudson. A team event with three teams, each with a lead designer and two assistants. Each team had $150 and one day to complete the design.

| Team | Team Leader | Team Members (in the order of being chosen) |
|---|---|---|
| 1 | Kevin | Nora, Alexandra |
| 2 | Jay | Kara, Robert |
| 3 | Austin | Wendy, Vanessa |

- Judges: Heidi Klum, Nina Garcia, Michael Kors
- Guest Judge: Sarah Hudson

WINNER: Kevin
ELIMINATED: Vanessa

=== Episode 5: "Model" Clients ===
Original airdate: January 12, 2005

Working with their chosen models, the designers created a wedding dress for that model. The designers had a budget of $300 and two days to complete the design.

- Judges: Heidi Klum, Michael Kors
- Guest Judges: Anne Slowey (sitting in for Nina Garcia), Amsale Aberra

WINNER: Kara
ELIMINATED: Nora

=== Episode 6: Making a Splash ===
Original airdate: January 19, 2005

Designers made swimsuits, then attended an evening party with their swimsuit-clad models. The designers had a budget of $75 and five hours to complete their garments. The winner was the designer who received a mention from New York Post reporter Richard Johnson on "Page Six," the newspaper's gossip column.

- Judges: Heidi Klum
- Guest Judges: Constance White (sitting in for Michael Kors), Anne Slowey (sitting in for Nina Garcia), New York Post reporter Richard Johnson

WINNER: Austin
ELIMINATED: Alexandra

=== Episode 7: Design a Collection ===
Original airdate: January 26, 2005

Designers created a collection for the year 2055 as one team. Kevin was the team leader for this challenge. Each designer had a budget of $50 to spend in a vintage shop and one day to complete the collection.

| Designer | Type of Look |
|---|---|
| Austin | 2055 Cocktail Party Dress |
| Robert | 2055 Streetwear |
| Kevin | 2055 Service Uniform |
| Wendy | 2055 Youth Outfit |
| Jay | 2055 Nightclub Outfit |
| Kara | 2055 Business Suit |

- Judges: Heidi Klum, Nina Garcia, Michael Kors
- Guest Judge: Betsey Johnson

WINNER: Kara
ELIMINATED: Kevin

=== Episode 8: Postal Uniform Challenge ===
Original airdate: February 2, 2005

Designers redesigned the uniform worn by United States Postal Service workers. The designers had a budget of $100 and one day to complete the design. This episode is particularly notable for the fact that Jay's model was unable to attend the runway showing in time. As a result, Austin walked in her place and received positive feedback for doing so by the judges.

- Judges: Heidi Klum, Nina Garcia, Michael Kors
- Guest Judge: United States Postal Service worker Becky Negich.

WINNER: Kara
ELIMINATED: Robert

- Note: Kara is the first designer to win two challenges in a row.

=== Episode 9: Design for the Red Carpet ===
Original airdate: February 9, 2005

Designers created a dress for Access Hollywood reporter Nancy O'Dell to wear to the Grammys. The designers had $300 and two days to complete the design.

- Judges: Heidi Klum, Nina Garcia, Michael Kors
- Guest Judge: Nancy O'Dell

WINNER: Wendy
ELIMINATED: Austin

- Note: Nancy O'Dell wore an altered version of Wendy's design.

=== Episode 10: Reunion ===
Original airdate: February 16, 2005

All of the participating designers gathered for a reunion hosted by Heidi Klum and Tim Gunn on the eve of Olympus New York Fashion Week at which the final three designers displayed their collections.

=== Episode 11: Finale ===
Original airdate: February 23, 2005

The final three designers—Jay, Kara Saun and Wendy—were visited by Tim Gunn at their homes to show the progress of their collections. Each designer created a twelve piece collection for a showing at New York Olympus Fashion Week. Kara Saun had designer shoes created for her collection, however producers determined that was in breach of the contract.

- Judges: Heidi Klum, Nina Garcia, Michael Kors
- Guest Judge: Parker Posey

WINNER: Jay
ELIMINATED: Kara (first runner-up), Wendy (second runner-up)

== Reception ==
Before the Fashion Week, Alessandra Stanley of The New York Times in mid-February 2005 found Jay McCarroll and Kara Saun "more talented and far more pleasant, and they [both] deserved to be finalists." Jill Radsken of Boston Herald also found McCarroll and Saun "worthy of the $100,000 and Banana Republic mentorship" and thought that Pepper should receive "her comeuppance", especially for being "a reality TV producer's dream" and focusing more on "her strategy (step on everyone else) than her designs".

In the Fashion Week, McCarroll and Saun became the judges' only plausible choices, despite flaws in their finale collections, when Pepper was out of the judges' consideration for the win. Most fans of the series thought the same as the judges, noted Penelope M. Carrington of Richmond Times-Dispatch.

In 2011, Vicky Hyman of The Star-Ledger considered crowning McCarroll winner over Saun "[m]ost surprising (but not undeserved)" of the first eight seasons.
