= Daniel Franco (designer) =

American fashion designer

- Born: November 11, 1971 (age 53)
- Education: Otis College of Art and Design; Fashion Institute of Design and Merchandising
- Occupation: fashion designer
- Television: Project Runway Season 1 (12th); Season 2 (12th); All Stars Season 5 (12th)

Daniel Franco (born November 11, 1971, in Los Angeles, California) is an American fashion designer. He achieved notability for appearing in three seasons of Project Runway. He is also famously known for achieving the same place (12th) 3 times.

== Biography ==
His father, Alejandro Franco was born in Lima, Peru. His mother, Maria Franco was born in El Salvador. Daniel Franco is fluent in English and Spanish.

Between 1977-1984 Franco was cast as the principal lead in 16 different television commercial campaigns promoting brands such as McDonald's, Tang & Raisin Bran Cereal. He starred in the PBS program "Villa Alegre", a Spanish version of Sesame Street for 2 seasons between 1977-1979. In 1980, Daniel Franco was cast as a recurring character on CBS soap opera "The Young & The Restless" for 1 season, as an illegitimate child of a regular cast member.

Franco holds both a Bachelor of Fine Arts degree from Otis College of Art and Design and an Associate Arts degree in fashion design from the Fashion Institute of Design and Merchandising in Los Angeles.

In 1995, Franco received critical acclaim when he was voted Best Designer in a nationwide contest for fashion students by The Fashion Group International. He received top honors in both the career and the leisure categories. By 1999 he had broadened his design experience by working in New York City as a fashion forecaster for a company called Here & There Int., assisting Richard Tyler and designing for BCBG twice. He worked for BCBG in 1997 and again in 2007.

Also in 1999, Franco designed his first clothing line, which was sold exclusively through Saks Fifth Avenue. He took a five-year hiatus from the fashion industry to run his family's business, The Albertson Wedding Chapel on Miracle Mile, Los Angeles, CA, when his father had 2 debilitating strokes and took ill. Not only did Franco deal with his father's illness but Franco also lived with Ménière's disease during this time. Shortly after his recovery he returned to the fashion world as a contestant on the first season of Project Runway. His experience on the show inspired him to relaunch the Daniel Franco collection with his first fashion show. His debut was well received by buyers, media and critics alike, which motivated him to return to television for another chance at Project Runway season two. Daniel Franco also created a collection for LA Fashion week in the fall of 2005 as well as New York fashion week in 2007.

Franco auditioned for FOX's American Idol in Season 9, but did not make the age cutoff. He was featured during the Adam Lambert lookalike montage.

== Project Runway ==
Franco appeared on seasons 1 and 2. During Season 1, he was out on the first episode (the challenge for that episode was to create a sexy, glamorous outfit for a night on the town made only from materials bought at a Manhattan supermarket). However, he returned on the second season. He had one of the lowest scores during the first episode (The designers were given six yards of plain white muslin, $20 and one week to create an outfit that best represents who they are as a fashion designer). He had one of the highest scores for the second episode's challenge (create an outfit using the clothes the designers are wearing at the time the challenge is announced), but he was out by the fourth episode (that episode's challenge was to create a lingerie line of 3 looks in groups of 3.) Franco famously stated, "I love you, Heidi," to host Heidi Klum on the Season 2 reunion episode. He was announced as a contestant on the fifth season of Project Runway: All Stars, where he was eliminated in the third episode.
