= Leanne Marshall =

American fashion designer

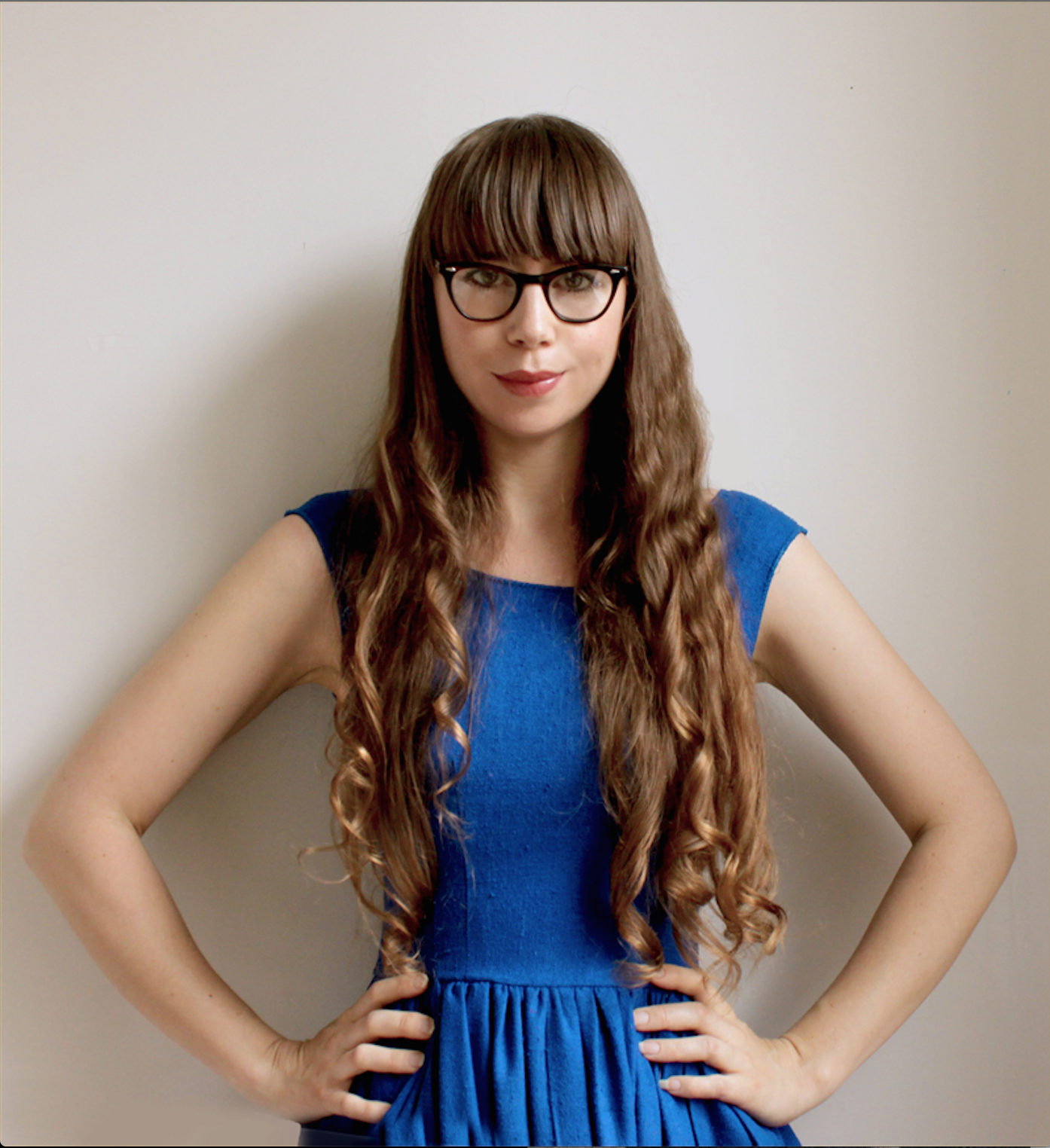
- Leanne Marshall
- Born: October 10, 1980 (age 45); Yuba City, California, U.S.
- Education: Fashion Institute of Design & Merchandising
- Occupation: fashion designer
- Television: Project Runway Season 5 (Winner)

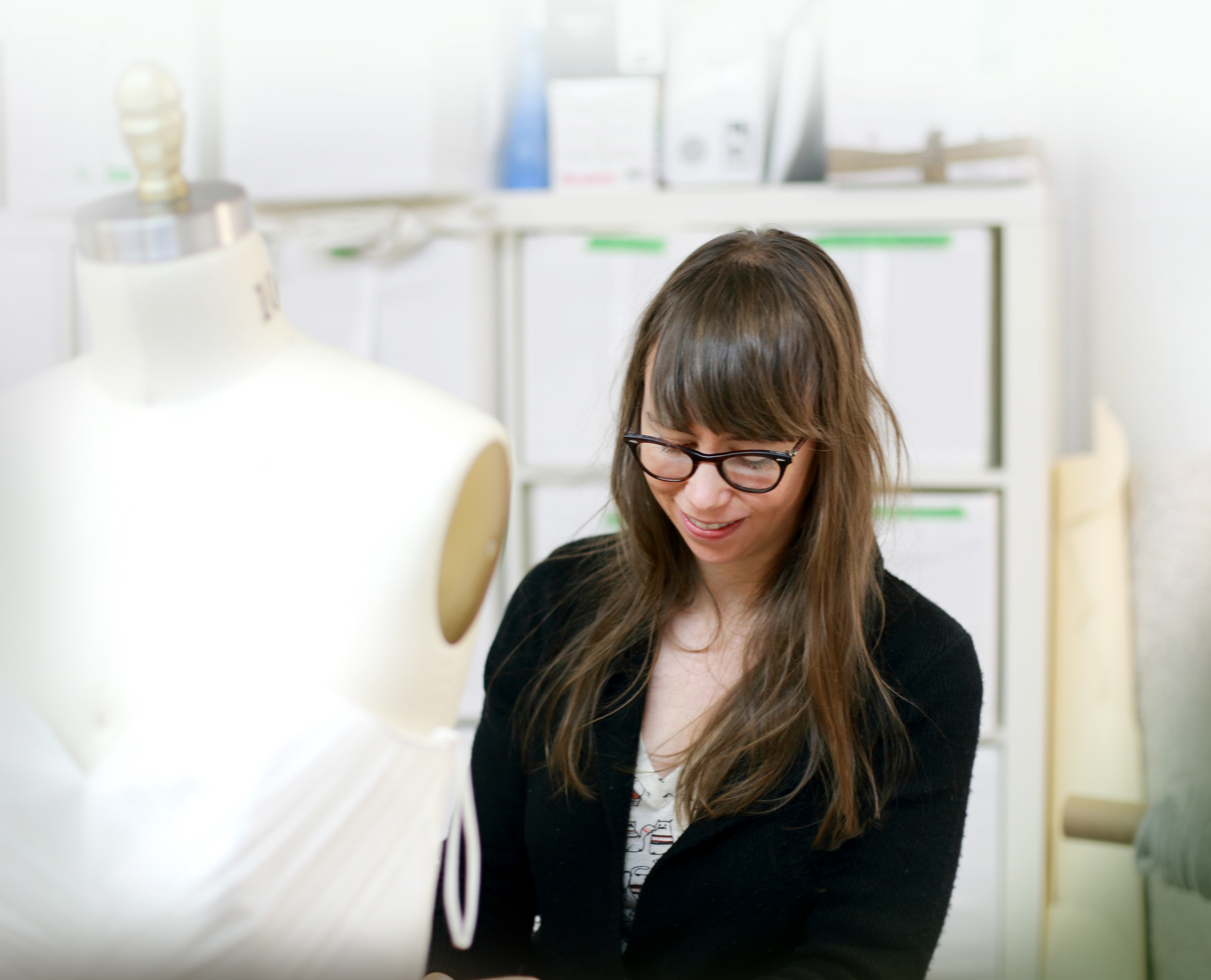
Leanne at work in her studio, 2014

Leanne Marshall (born October 10, 1980, in Yuba City, California) is an American fashion designer in Portland, Oregon. She was the winner of season 5 of Project Runway.

== Project Runway ==
Leanne Marshall and Wesley Nault were the bottom two design contestants in Episode 2 of Project Runway, "The Grass Is Always Greener". In Episode 3, "Bright Lights, Big City", Marshall was among the top three design contestants. She maintained a good stride throughout the rest of the competition, consecutively winning two challenges: "Fashion that Drives You" and "Double 0 Fashion".

Marshall was chosen as one of the final top three design contestants and designed a wave-inspired collection for the final competition. Her collection was judged against collections by Kenley Collins with some of Collins' personally hand-painted fabrics, and by Korto Momolu with hints of African inspiration. Leanne Marshall's feminine waves captured the judges and she became the winner of Season 5.

== Design career ==
Marshall began her runway fashion career in 2006 and 2007 at Portland Fashion Week in Portland, Oregon. After a year and a half of hard work developing the line, Leanne's popularity grew and so did her sales. In mid 2007, she was able to leave her money job behind and make the leap into designing her own label full-time.

In 2008, Leanne was selected as a contestant for Season 5 of Project Runway. She made it all the way to the finale where she showed her wave inspired collection in shades of turquoise, ivory and sand. She was crowned the winner. Marshall created an eco-friendly line for bluefly.com that debuted in July 2009. At that same time, she also designed a maternity dress for Heidi Klum.

Fresh after her Project Runway win, Leanne relocated to New York City where she continued to develop her line.

After years of designing custom bridal gowns, Leanne officially launched her signature bridal line in 2011. The bridal collection was carried in over 18 boutiques internationally and online. In 2014, she released an exclusive selection of dresses with BHLDN. In May 2022, Marshall quit the bridal industry, citing its "outdated traditions and its lack of sustainability."

As of June 2025, her studio offers Ready to Wear, Evening, and Performance pieces produced on a made-to-order basis using deadstock materials and sustainable textiles. Marshall also offers a Custom/Bespoke Design service virtually, or in person in New York City and Paris.

Her design studio and flagship showroom is located in New York City's Fashion District.

Preceded by Christian Siriano	Project Runway winner Leanne Marshall	Succeeded by Irina Shabayeva
