= Jay McCarroll =

American fashion designer

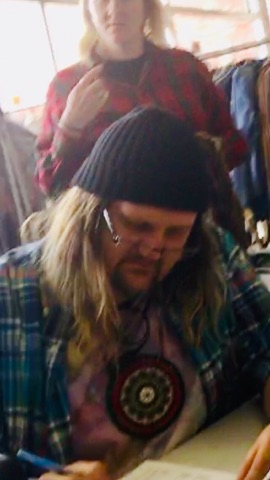
- McCarroll on the set of Mare of Easttown, February 2020
- Born: October 11, 1974 (age 52)
- Education: Philadelphia University; London College of Fashion
- Occupation: fashion designer
- Television: Project Runway season 1 (Winner)

Jay McCarroll (born October 11, 1974) is an American fashion designer best known for winning the debut season of the competitive reality television series Project Runway in 2005. He launched his first collection line "Transport" at a 2006 New York Fashion Week. The launching and making of the collection were notoriously documented in a 2009 documentary film Eleven Minutes.

== Early life and career ==
Jay McCarroll was born the sixth child of his parents William and Nancy McCarroll of Lehman Township, Luzerne County, and has remained the youngest in the family. One of his siblings is a sister. McCarroll was a member of the Lake-Lehman Junior/Senior High School's marching band. He further attended the Philadelphia University from 1994 to 1997 but was three credits short of earning his degree. Then he graduated from the University's School of Textiles in 1997. He also attended the London College of Fashion. He then distributed his designer clothes to Patricia Field's boutiques overseas in Amsterdam, London and Paris as well as Field's now-closed boutiques in Philadelphia.

== Project Runway season 1 (2004–05) ==
=== Before the finale ===
When he was invited via phone to an audition in spring 2004, McCarroll worked in a porn industry for around two years and operated a vintage clothing store in his hometown Lehman, Pennsylvania, 124 miles (200 km) north of Philadelphia. Two days after being cast, he rode a bus to New York City to attend the filming of the series. A gay thirty-year old Pennsylvanian fashion designer himself, his work throughout the season had been a mixture "of sci-fi, technicolor, and street style". The series's official website nicknamed him "The Wild Card".

Up to becoming a finalist, McCarroll had never won any of the season's nine total challenges. Nonetheless, the judges had praised his "consistent creativity" throughout the season and leadership in the fourth challenge. McCarroll had been presented as the "most flamboyant" contestant of the season. In the third challenge, the judges praised his cocktail holiday dress inspired by Art Deco. However, Wendy Pepper's dress was the judges' and sponsor Banana Republic's top choice for being easier to manufacture. In the eighth challenge, when McCarroll's model failed to appear, his competitor Austin Scarlett substituted for her by wearing McCarroll's work on a runway.

=== During the finale ===
For the Fashion Week, McCarroll developed a street style collection "Stereotype", influenced by music, Japanese fashion, and his prior work experience in the porn industry. The collection also used "a pastiche of colors and textures" and "featured versatile, monochromatic looks with a tech[-]y vibe." It also included headphones in various colors and huge amount of quilts (influenced by one of his sisters' quilting hobby).

McCarroll became the series's first winner ever against the first runner-up Kara Saun and the second runner-up Wendy Pepper. Several clothes of his Fashion Week collection (alongside several others of Saun's and of Pepper's) were auctioned off via the series's official website when the auction ended on March 2, 2005. The auction sales were donated to the Dress for Success organization.

=== After the finale ===
After the win, McCarroll discovered that accepting the $100,000 prize was conditional on an ongoing financial interest in his work. New York reported that The Weinstein Company would receive a ten percent stake in his then-nonexistent brand. In a 2023 interview, the series's mentor Tim Gunn, who said that he reviewed the contract with McCarroll, gave a different account: according to Gunn, the contract required fifteen percent of everything McCarroll earned in perpetuity to be paid to Miramax. McCarroll declined the $100,000 prize and the mentorship from Banana Republic, but was featured on the front cover of an Elle magazine issue. New York subsequently reported that The Weinstein Company had dropped the clause.

== Post-Project Runway activities ==
=== Life in New York City (2005–07) ===
After winning Project Runway and then declining the cash prize and the mentorship program, McCarroll moved to New York City in mid-August 2005 in attempt to thrive in a highly competitive fashion industry for two further years. Before then, he received a Spirit of Design Award from Philadelphia University on May 7, 2005.

McCarroll reportedly made a red carpet dress for Runway host Heidi Klum, who requested it weeks after giving birth, to wear at the 57th Annual Primetime Emmy Awards (2005). However, Klum chose instead "a floral, off-the-shoulder Christian Dior frock". In a 2006 interview with The Record, as Klum admitted, McCarroll's red carpet gown was neither "sophisticated" nor "elegant" nor suitable "for the occasion."

McCarroll briefly appeared in the second season (2005–06) of Project Runway as part of an audition judging panel and then as a guest challenge judge. He also appeared in Project Jay, a special documentary exploring his post-Project Runway life, which aired on Bravo on February 22, 2006. Saun, Pepper, and Scarlett made cameo appearances there. The removal of his intervertebral disk amid his back surgery was documented in the program. By the same period, he developed a shirt for Katie Lee, then-wife of Billy Joel, and "a kimono-style dress for a member of [the] Manhattan Transfer", a musical vocal group. The "kimono-style dress" was modeled at a New York Fashion Week event, during the same period.

On September 15 of that same year, McCarroll launched his first collection, Transport, at another New York Fashion Week event. Transport was inspired by Archigram, a 1960s-established group of British architects whose drawings mixed "futuristic space-age elements—lots of hot-air balloons, aerodynamic flying cars, and moving streets[...]—with then-contemporary cityscapes." It was inspired by also the B-52's music. Because of his stance against furs, the Humane Society of the United States contributed to and sponsored the Transport line and runway show. Clifford Pugh of the Toronto Star reported that audiences raved throughout the show over McCarroll's "mod collection of balloon-print turtlenecks, V-neck balloon dresses and patchwork gowns worn by models with beehive hairdos", but Pugh found the collection not "very good".

McCarroll then worked at a McDonald's-sponsored fashion show in November 2006 as a stylist and designed a dress for R&B singer Kelis. The dress was made with around three hundred gift cards, some of them sprinkled with crystals. McDonald's auctioned off the dress as "part of a limited-edition ensemble" on eBay on December 18–31 of the same year. The sale of the whole bundle was donated to the Ronald McDonald House Charities (RMHC) for children needing medical care.

By March 2007, some of McCarroll's designer pieces were distributed to Urban Outfitters stores.

=== Post-New York City life (2007–present) ===
After his father died in summer 2007, McCarroll moved back to Pennsylvania from New York City and began teaching at Philadelphia University, though he maintained a studio in New York City for some time after the move. (Note: McCarroll told the New York magazine, "I haven't been living anywhere for two years. I sleep at other people's houses. I sleep here if I'm drunk." He referred "here" to his then-studio in New York City. The magazine reported him as "homeless". Nevertheless, McCarroll claimed what he said as a "joke" when the magazine issue was released. He told the Philadelphia magazine that he was "homeless" in just New York City but was in progress of returning completely to Pennsylvania and still had a work studio in New York City.)

On February 1, 2008, McCarroll's T-shirts launched online exclusively via the website Camp Beverly Hills, the revived brand best known for selling summer camp clothes to then-teenagers of the 1980s. Later that month, he made a cameo appearance in the fourth season (2007–08) of Project Runway alongside two other winners, Chloe Dao and Jeffrey Sebelia.

In 2008, he launched one of his clothes lines via QVC. He also designed T-shirts to benefit the Alex's Lemonade Stand Foundation for childhood cancer research and donated $5 per T-shirt sold for the cause.

McCarroll participated in the seventh season (2010) of the VH1 reality television series Celebrity Fit Club. He served as one of team captains and lost 40 pounds (18 kg) to win the season. He also appeared frequently in the PBS program Quilting Arts.

McCarroll was appointed Fashion Ambassador of the Hamilton Mall (Jersey Shore) for 2013 and 2014. By July 2014, he was working as a textile designer in Philadelphia. He also worked for the wardrobe department of the 2021 HBO miniseries Mare of Easttown.

== Eleven Minutes documentary (2009) ==
Eleven Minutes
- Directed by: Michael Selditch; Rob Tate
- Produced by: Michael Selditch; Rob Tate
- Starring: Jay McCarroll; Nancy Kane; Kelly Cutrone; Jason Low; Eve Salvail; Omahyra Mota
- Cinematography: Alex Wolfe; Rob Tate; Michael Selditch
- Edited by: Rob Tate
- Music by: John Sands
- Production company: Maximum Vacuum
- Distributed by: Here! Films; Regent Releasing
- Release dates: February 20, 2009 (US, limited)
- Running time: 108 minutes

A 108-minute documentary film Eleven Minutes, produced and directed by filmmakers Michael Selditch and Rob Tate, about primarily how McCarroll's first independent New York Fashion Week show in 2006 had been made was screened for the 17th Annual Philadelphia Film Festival (April 3–15, 2008), a Hot Docs Canadian International Documentary Festival (Toronto) in late April 2008, the Independent Film Festival Boston at the Somerville Theatre in also late April 2008, the Honolulu Rainbow Film Festival in late May 2008, the Cinema Diverse film festival (Palm Springs, California) in late July 2008, the Calgary International Film Festival in late September 2008, and the Reeling film festival (Chicago) in November 2008. The film was screened for also the New York Lesbian, Gay, Bisexual, & Transgender Film Festival and the San Francisco International LGBT Film Festival.

Here! Films and Regent Releasing distributed the film into limited theatres of New York City, Los Angeles, Philadelphia, Phoenix (Arizona), and San Francisco on February 20, 2009. On the same day, the film aired on the here! television network and was distributed as an on-demand content of the network. It was then released on DVD on February 23, 2010.

The Wall Street Journal film critic Joe Morgenstern found the film not as "detail[ed]" as a 1995 documentary film Unzipped about Isaac Mizrahi, yet he wrote that the film "conveys an ample sense of the process" of developing the runway show. An amNewYork film critic Mina Hochberg rated it two out of four stars, writing that McCarroll's "personality is more interesting as sound bites than as a full-fledged film." The Arizona Republic critic Bill Goodykoontz rated it two and a half out of five stars, i.e. between "bad" (two stars) and "fair" (three stars), writing that the film, despite having merits, is "all Jay, all the time, and that gets a little old."

Los Angeles Daily News gave the film three stars, noting the film's portrayal of contrast between winning a competitive reality television series like Project Runway and surviving a "tough, competitive industry" like fashion. New York Daily News critic Elizabeth Weitzman gave it also three stars, noting that "[f]ashion fanatics" would enjoy "the behind-the-scenes perspective" more than others who would see McCarroll "complaining about opportunities other struggling designers would kill for."

== Notes ==
Preceded by First season	Project Runway winner Jay McCarroll	Succeeded by Chloe Dao
