= Stephen "Suede" Baum =

American fashion designer

- Born: Stephen Whitney Baum; December 19, 1970 (age 55); Seven Hills, Ohio, U.S.
- Education: Kent State University
- Occupation: Fashion Designer
- Known for: Project Runway Season 5, Project Runway: All Stars, SUEDEsays Brand

Stephen "Suede" Baum (born Stephen Whitney Baum December 19, 1970) is an independent American fashion designer based in New York City originally from Seven Hills, Ohio. He was a contestant on the fifth season of the television series Project Runway and the second season of Project Runway: All Stars, and is the creator of the SUEDEsays Brand.

== Background ==
Baum was born in Seven Hills, Ohio, a suburb of Cleveland, and has one older brother. He is a 1989 graduate of Normandy High School in Parma, Ohio and graduated from Kent State University in Kent, Ohio in 1993, where he majored in fashion design. After finishing his degree and garnering the nickname "Suede" during his college years, Baum moved to New York City and interned with Geoffrey Beene on Mr. Beene's Couture collection.

Baum created his first evening wear collection which premiered at the Cleveland Center of Contemporary Art alongside other designers. He went on to work for well-known brands, Rocawear Girls, Lee 1889, Jordache, Polo Jeans Company and Todd Oldham Jeans. Suede has also worked for Old Navy, Phillips Van-Heusen and Vanity Fair Corporation. In 2001, he established the SUEDEsays Critics Award scholarship at the Kent State University School of Fashion, awarded each year to one senior designer graduate.

== Project Runway ==
Baum was a contestant in season five of Project Runway, which first aired in 2008, the final season of Project Runway to air on Bravo TV. He spoke in third person during the entirety of the Project Runway show. In the second episode, "Grass is always Greener", contestant designers were tasked with creating a red carpet look for "young Hollywood," but were not permitted to buy their own fabrics. Each contestant's model went to Mood Fabrics and selected fabrics that each designer would use to create their look. Suede won this challenge, which was judged in part by actress and guest judge, Natalie Portman. Over 250 pieces of this dress were manufactured and sold on Bluefly.com. Suede was eliminated after making it to the top five, but was brought back to show a collection during New York Fashion Week.

== Later life ==
In 2009, Suede was inducted into the Kent State University Fashion Hall of Fame. Later that year, Cleveland PBS station WVIZ-TV aired a special segment about Suede on the Applause show.

In 2010 Suede created custom work for the Craft and Hobby Association in Chicago utilizing a new machine, the eCraft by Craftwell. At the end of 2010 Suede signed his first licensing deal with Simplicity Patterns. Responding to high sales Simplicity branched Suede's collection into their UK based New Look line launching SUEDEsays Studio by New Look. Suede's first menswear patterns and designs became available in September 2011.
