= On the Road with Austin & Santino =

- Genre: Reality
- Starring: Austin Scarlett; Santino Rice
- Country of origin: United States
- Original language: English
- No. of seasons: 1
- No. of episodes: 14

Production
- Executive producer: Rich Bye
- Running time: 21 minutes
- Production companies: The Weinstein Company Television; Goodbye Pictures

Original release
- Network: Lifetime
- Release: July 29 – November 4, 2010

Related
- Project Runway

On the Road With Austin & Santino is an American reality television series that aired on Lifetime. The series debuted on July 29, 2010, following the season premiere of Season 8 of Project Runway. Each episode aired after an episode of Project Runway. The series has since been cancelled and was not renewed for a second season.

== Premise ==
On the Road with Austin & Santino follows fashion designers Austin Scarlett and Santino Rice as they travel to small towns around the United States and make a custom dress for a woman who has an upcoming special occasion. Each episode ends with Austin and Santino introducing their dress recipient at the event it was created for.

== Episodes ==
No.	Title	Original release date
1	"Horsing Around"	July 29, 2010
In the series debut, the duo travels to Weatherford, Texas to make a dress for a rodeo trick rider, Sadie Lynn. They then go shopping for dress materials at Teskey's Saddle Shop for cowboy related accessories and Santino visits Gibson's Products, a general store, for the fabric.
2	"Basic Training"	August 5, 2010
3	"Got Antlers?"	August 12, 2010
4	"Brickfest Beauties"	August 19, 2010
5	"Wedding Knots"	August 26, 2010
6	"Bachelorette Beauty Queen"	September 2, 2010
7	"Bottled Up"	September 9, 2010
8	"Through Thick and Thin"	September 16, 2010
9	"Designer Overboard"	September 23, 2010
10	"We Love a Parade"	September 30, 2010
11	"Celebrating in Style"	October 7, 2010
12	"Cop Out"	October 14, 2010
13	"Pawty Time"	October 21, 2010
14	"Life's a Stage"	November 4, 2010
