= Project Runway All Stars season 5 =

Project Runway All Stars
- Season 5
- Hosted by: Alyssa Milano
- Judges: Georgina Chapman; Isaac Mizrahi
- No. of tasks: 13
- No. of contestants: 13
- Winner: Dom Streater
- No. of episodes: 13

Release
- Original network: Lifetime
- Original release: February 11 – May 5, 2016

Season chronology
- ← Previous; Season 4 Next → Season 6

Project Runway All Stars (Season 5) is the fifth season of the Project Runway spin-off series Project Runway All Stars. It features 13 designers from previous seasons of the original series and Project Runway: Under the Gunn with Alyssa Milano returning as both host and judge. TV fashion correspondent and Marie Claire’s Senior Fashion Editor Zanna Roberts Rassi also returns to mentor contestants.

The prizes for this season are the opportunity to design an exclusive line of jewelry for BaubleBar.com, a capsule footwear collection by Chinese Laundry, a fashion spread in Marie Claire and a position at the magazine as Contributing Editor, a complete sewing studio to launch his/her winning line from Brothers Sewing and Embroidery and a cash prize of USD 100,000.

== Contestants ==
Contestant	Hometown	Original season(s)	Original placement(s)	Finish	Outcome
Fäde zu Grau	Coral Gables, Florida	Season 13	9	Episode 2	13
Daniel Franco	Los Angeles, California	Season 1	12	Episode 3	12
Daniel Franco	Los Angeles, California	Season 2	12	Episode 3	12
Stella Zotis	New York, New York	Season 5	9	Episode 4	11
Mitchell Perry	Fort Lauderdale, Florida	Season 13	12	Episode 6	10
Valerie Mayen	Cleveland, Ohio	Season 8	7	Episode 7	9
Alexander Pope	Ridgewood, Queens, New York City	Season 12	7	Episode 8	8
Layana Aguilar	New York, New York	Season 11	5	Episode 9	7
Asha Daniels	Cincinnati, Ohio	Under the Gunn	3	Episode 10	6
Emily Payne	San Francisco, California	Season 13	5	Episode 11	5
Sam Donovan	Boston, Massachusetts	Under the Gunn	2	Episode 12	4
Ken Laurence	Atlanta, Georgia	Season 12	8	Episode 13	3
Kini Zamora	Kapolei, Hawaii	Season 13	3	Episode 13	2
Dom Streater	Philadelphia, Pennsylvania	Season 12	1	Episode 13	1

== Models ==
- Shyloh Wilkinson
- Dominique Marene
- Tierra Benton
- Erin Mulcahy
- Sara Bledsoe
- Alea Saunders
- Sara Gardner
- Lyric Lincoln
- Molly Fletcher
- Hildie Gifstad
- Keyshla Maisonet
- Ashley Hart

== Designer Progress ==
Designer Elimination Table
Designers	1	2	3	4	5	6	7	8	9	10	11	12	13	Eliminated Episode
Dom	IN	IN	IN	IN	HIGH	IN	WIN	HIGH	HIGH	LOW	HIGH	WIN	WINNER	Episode 13: New York State of Mind
Kini	IN	HIGH	HIGH	IN	HIGH	IN	IN	HIGH	WIN	HIGH	HIGH	HIGH	RUNNER-UP	Episode 13: New York State of Mind
Ken	HIGH	IN	IN	HIGH	IN	WIN	HIGH	IN	LOW	LOW	WIN	LOW	3RD PLACE	Episode 13: New York State of Mind
Sam	IN	WIN	HIGH	WIN	LOW	HIGH	HIGH	LOW	LOW	HIGH	LOW	OUT		Episode 12: Prince of Prints
Emily	IN	LOW	IN	IN	WIN	IN	LOW	IN	IN	WIN	OUT			Episode 11: State of Art
Asha	LOW	IN	WIN	LOW	IN	IN	IN	WIN	HIGH	OUT				Episode 10: Rebel With A Cause
Layana	HIGH	IN	IN	IN	IN	LOW	LOW	LOW	OUT					Episode 9: A Touch of Style
Alexander	IN	LOW	WIN	LOW	IN	LOW	IN	OUT						Episode 8: Once Upon a Runway
Valerie	WIN	HIGH	LOW	HIGH	LOW	HIGH	OUT							Episode 7: Bait and Stitch
Mitchell	LOW	IN	LOW	IN	HIGH	OUT								Episode 6: Going for Baroque
Stella	IN	IN	LOW	OUT										Episode 4: Fashion 911
Daniel	LOW	IN	OUT											Episode 3: A Little Bit Country, A Little Bit Rock 'n' Roll
Fäde	IN	OUT												Episode 2: Let it Flow

The designer won season five of Project Runway All Stars.
The designer won the challenge.
The designer came in second but did not win the challenge.
The designer had one of the highest scores for the challenge but did not win.
The designer had one of the lowest scores for the challenge but was not eliminated.
The designer was in the bottom two but was not eliminated.
The designer lost the challenge and was eliminated from the competition.

== Model Elimination Table ==
Model Elimination Table
Models	1	2	3	4	5	6	7	8	9	10	11	12	13
Hildie	LA	SZ	EP	KL	-	SD	LA	AD	KZ	EP	KZ	DS	DS
Shyloh	SD	DS	MP	AP	-	LA	DS	KZ	EP	KL	SD	KZ	DS
Tierra	SZ	MP	SZ	DS	-	AD	KZ	EP	LA	KZ	KL	KL	KL
Sarah	DS	KZ	SD	SD	-	KL	AD	AP	SD	AD	EP	SD	KZ
Sara	EP	KL	VM	LA	-	AP	EP	KL	AD	SD	DS	OUT	KZ
Alea	KL	LA	KL	EP	-	MP	VM	LA	KL	DS	OUT	-	DS
Erin	KZ	SD	KZ	MP	-	EP	AP	SD	DS	OUT	-	-	KL
Dominique	AP	DF	AD	AD	-	VM	SD	DS	OUT	-	-	-	KL
Keyshla	AD	AD	DF	KZ	-	KZ	KL	OUT	-	-	-	-	KL
Lyric	DF	FG	AP	SZ	-	DS	OUT	-	-	-	-	-	KZ
Allisandra	FG	VM	DS	VM	OUT	-	-	-	-	-	-	-	KZ
Molly	-	-	-	-	-	-	-	-	-	-	-	-	DS
Ashley	VM	EP	LA	OUT									
Rebe	MP	AP	OUT										

The model wore the winning design of the winner of Project Runway All Stars.
The model wore the 2nd place design of the runner-up of Project Runway All Stars.
The model wore the 3rd place design of the 2nd runner-up of Project Runway All Stars.
The model wore the winning design that challenge.
The model wore the 2nd place design that challenge.
The model wore the 3rd place design that challenge.
The model wore the 3rd to worse design that challenge.
The model wore the 2nd to worst design that challenge.
The model wore the losing design that challenge.
The model was eliminated.

- In episode 5, the models were not needed in the challenge.

Designer Legend

- Alexander Pope: AP
- Asha Daniels: AD
- Daniel Franco: DF
- Dom Streater: DS
- Emily Payne: EP
- Fade Zu Grau: FG
- Ken Laurence: KL
- Kini Zamora: KZ
- Layana Aguilar: LA
- Mitchell Perry: MP
- Sam Donovan: SD
- Stella Zotis: SZ
- Valerie Mayen: VM

== Episodes ==
=== Episode 1: What Makes An All Star? ===
Original airdate: February 11, 2016

The designers must tap into their past to create a look inspired by a moment that kick-started their fashion career.

- Guest Judge: Dmitry Sholokhov
- WINNER: Valerie
- ELIMINATED: None

=== Episode 2: Let it Flow ===
Original airdate: February 18, 2016

A wind machine on the runway tasks the designers with creating dramatic, elegant looks that showcase the movement of the fabric.

- Guest Judge: Vanessa Hudgens
- WINNER: Sam
- ELIMINATED: Fäde

=== Episode 3: A Little Bit Country, A Little Bit Rock 'n' Roll ===
Original airdate: February 25, 2016

The designers must team up with music group Little Big Town to create "opposites attract" red-carpet gowns for the Academy of Country Music Awards. The pairs are:

Sam/Kini, Asha/Alexander, Valerie/Stella, Emily/Layana, Dom/Ken, Daniel/Mitchell

- Guest Judge: Little Big Town
- WINNER: Alexander & Asha
- ELIMINATED: Daniel

=== Episode 4: Fashion 911 ===
Original airdate: March 3, 2016

The Unconventional Challenge finds the designers turning New York City emergency services materials into runway-worthy looks.

- Guest Judge: Johnny Wujek
- WINNER: Sam
- ELIMINATED: Stella

=== Episode 5: Birthday Suits ===
Original airdate: March 10, 2016

The designers must create winter wear to keep uninhibited naturists toasty warm on the naked runway.

- Guest Judge: Aimee Song (Blogger: Song of Style) and Naeem Khan
- WINNER: Emily
- ELIMINATED: None

=== Episode 6: Going for Baroque ===
Original airdate: March 17, 2016

The designers celebrate Baroque fashion by creating couture inspired gowns.

- Guest Judge: Coco Rocha and Keren Craig
- WINNER: Ken
- ELIMINATED: Mitchell

=== Episode 7: Bait and Stitch ===
Original airdate: March 24, 2016

The All Stars are challenged to create evening resort wear from fabric preselected by another designer.

- Guest Judge: Megan Hilty
- WINNER: Dom
- ELIMINATED: Valerie

=== Episode 8: Once Upon a Runway ===
Original airdate: March 31, 2016

Laura Michelle Kelly, star of Broadway's Finding Neverland, challenges the designers to re-imagine looks for classic fairy-tale characters. The characters are assigned thus: Alexander: Cinderella; Asha: Rapunzel; Dom: Tinkerbell; Emily: The Snow Queen; Ken: Snow White; Kini: Alice (in Wonderland); Layana: Belle; Sam: The Little Mermaid.

- Guest Judge: Kesha and Brad Goreski
- WINNER: Asha
- ELIMINATED: Alexander

=== Episode 9: A Touch of Style ===
Original airdate: April 7, 2016

The designers must combine sports and fashion to create high-end leisure wear inspired by the "Touch by Alyssa Milano" line.

- Guest Judge: Kristin Cavallari
- WINNER: Kini
- ELIMINATED: Layana

=== Episode 10: Rebel With A Cause ===
Original airdate: April 14, 2016

Fashion designer Zac Posen and actress Debi Mazar join the judges to critique sophisticated summer looks with an edge.

- Guest judge: Debi Mazar and Zac Posen
- WINNER: Emily
- ELIMINATED: Asha

=== Episode 11: State of Art ===
Original airdate: April 21, 2016

Tensions run high as the designers are pushed to the limit to create avant-garde fashion inspired by contemporary art.

- Guest judge: Boy George
- WINNER: Ken
- ELIMINATED: Emily

=== Episode 12: Prince of Prints ===
Original airdate: April 28, 2016

Four surprise guests return to advise the designers as they create print-on-print looks for Nina Garcia: two designers battle to make the finale.

- Guest Judge: Nina García, Dmitry Sholokhov, Mondo Guerra, Seth Aaron Henderson, Anthony Ryan Auld
- WINNER: Dom
- ELIMINATED: Sam

=== Episode 13: New York State of Mind ===
Original airdate: May 5, 2016

The designers are challenged to create collections that are inspired by New York: the winner is chosen.

- Guest judge: Debra Messing and Anne Fulenwider
- WINNER: Dom
- ELIMINATED: Ken & Kini
