= Seven Hills, Ohio =

- City
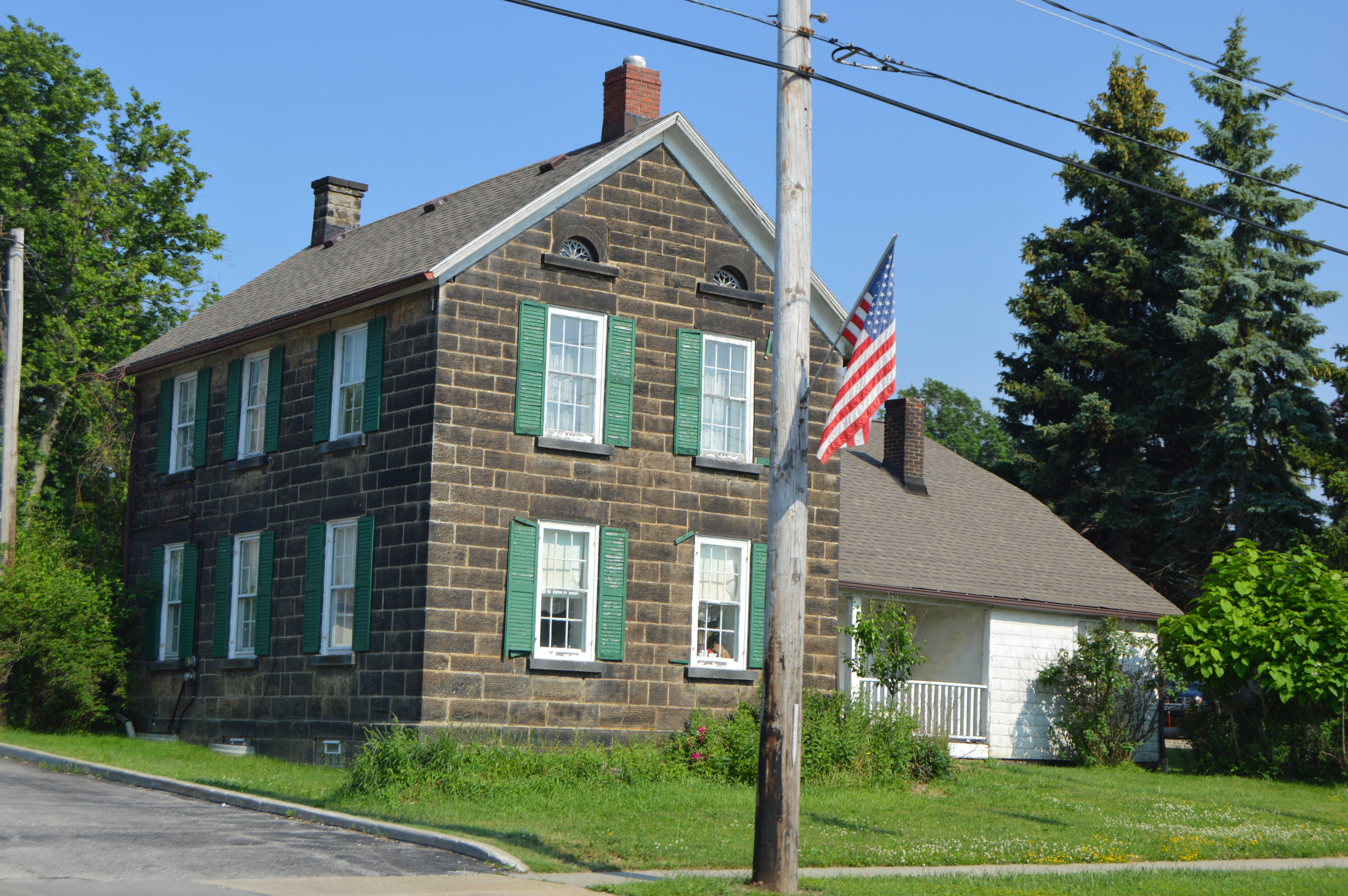
- John Froelich House on Broadview Road

- Flag Seal
- Interactive map of Seven Hills, Ohio
- Location within Ohio Location within the United States
- Coordinates: 41°23′16″N 81°40′31″W
- Country: United States
- State: Ohio
- County: Cuyahoga
- Incorporated (village): 1927
- Incorporated (city): 1961

Government
  - Type: Mayor-council
  - Mayor: Anthony D. Biasiotta (R)

Area
  - Total: 4.91 sq mi (12.71 km^{2})
  - Land: 4.90 sq mi (12.69 km^{2})
  - Water: 0.0077 sq mi (0.02 km^{2})
- Elevation: 883 ft (269 m)

Population (2020)
  - Total: 11,720
  - Density: 2,391.3/sq mi (923.27/km^{2})
- Time zone: UTC-5 (Eastern (EST))
  - Summer (DST): UTC-4 (EDT)
- ZIP code: 44131
- Area code: 216
- FIPS code: 39-71416
- GNIS feature ID: 1049166
- Website: http://www.sevenhillsohio.org/

Seven Hills is a city in Cuyahoga County, Ohio, United States. The population was 11,720 at the 2020 census. It is a suburb of Cleveland.

== Geography ==
Seven Hills is located at 41°23′16″N 81°40′31″W (41.387703, -81.675350).

According to the United States Census Bureau, the city has a total area of 4.92 square miles (12.74 km^{2}), of which 4.91 square miles (12.72 km^{2}) is land and 0.01 square miles (0.03 km^{2}) is water.

== History ==
Seven Hills was incorporated as a village in 1927, from the remaining unincorporated portion of Independence Township.

== Demographics ==
Historical population
Census	Pop.	Note	%±
1930	383		—
1940	555		44.9%
1950	1,350		143.2%
1960	5,708		322.8%
1970	12,700		122.5%
1980	13,650		7.5%
1990	12,339		−9.6%
2000	12,080		−2.1%
2010	11,804		−2.3%
2020	11,720		−0.7%
2025 (est.)	11,464		−2.2%

=== Racial and ethnic composition ===
Seven Hills city, Ohio – Racial and ethnic composition Note: the US Census treats Hispanic/Latino as an ethnic category. This table excludes Latinos from the racial categories and assigns them to a separate category. Hispanics/Latinos may be of any race.
Race / Ethnicity (NH = Non-Hispanic)	Pop 2000	Pop 2010	Pop 2020	% 2000	% 2010	% 2020
White alone (NH)	11,668	11,175	10,457	96.59%	94.67%	89.22%
Black or African American alone (NH)	18	85	227	0.15%	0.72%	1.94%
Native American or Alaska Native alone (NH)	3	3	6	0.02%	0.03%	0.05%
Asian alone (NH)	256	293	356	2.12%	2.48%	3.04%
Native Hawaiian or Pacific Islander alone (NH)	0	0	1	0.00%	0.00%	0.01%
Other race alone (NH)	1	10	39	0.01%	0.08%	0.33%
Mixed race or Multiracial (NH)	42	85	306	0.35%	0.72%	2.61%
Hispanic or Latino (any race)	92	153	328	0.76%	1.30%	2.80%
Total	12,080	11,804	11,720	100.00%	100.00%	100.00%

=== 2020 census ===
As of the 2020 census, Seven Hills had a population of 11,720. The median age was 51.9 years; 14.3% of residents were under the age of 18 and 27.8% of residents were 65 years of age or older. For every 100 females there were 96.0 males, and for every 100 females age 18 and over there were 94.0 males age 18 and over.

100.0% of residents lived in urban areas, while 0.0% lived in rural areas.

There were 5,083 households in Seven Hills, of which 19.6% had children under the age of 18 living in them. Of all households, 56.0% were married-couple households, 15.3% were households with a male householder and no spouse or partner present, and 23.0% were households with a female householder and no spouse or partner present. About 26.6% of all households were made up of individuals and 15.2% had someone living alone who was 65 years of age or older.

There were 5,268 housing units, of which 3.5% were vacant. The homeowner vacancy rate was 1.1% and the rental vacancy rate was 0.9%.

Racial composition as of the 2020 census
Race	Number	Percent
White	10,531	89.9%
Black or African American	240	2.0%
American Indian and Alaska Native	8	0.1%
Asian	359	3.1%
Native Hawaiian and Other Pacific Islander	1	0.0%
Some other race	118	1.0%
Two or more races	463	4.0%
Hispanic or Latino (of any race)	328	2.8%

=== 2010 census ===
As of the census of 2010, there were 11,804 people, 4,989 households, and 3,586 families living in the city. The population density was 2,404.1 inhabitants per square mile (928.2/km^{2}). There were 5,167 housing units at an average density of 1,052.3 per square mile (406.3/km^{2}). The racial makeup of the city was 95.6% White, 0.8% African American, 0.1% Native American, 2.5% Asian, 0.2% from other races, and 0.7% from two or more races. Hispanic or Latino of any race were 1.3% of the population.

There were 4,989 households, of which 21.5% had children under the age of 18 living with them, 61.0% were married couples living together, 7.7% had a female householder with no husband present, 3.2% had a male householder with no wife present, and 28.1% were non-families. 24.8% of all households were made up of individuals, and 14.4% had someone living alone who was 65 years of age or older. The average household size was 2.36 and the average family size was 2.82.

The median age in the city was 50 years. 16.3% of residents were under the age of 18; 5.7% were between the ages of 18 and 24; 19.7% were from 25 to 44; 32% were from 45 to 64; and 26.3% were 65 years of age or older. The gender makeup of the city was 48.7% male and 51.3% female.

=== 2000 census ===
As of the census of 2000, there were 12,080 people, 4,787 households, and 3,757 families living in the city. The population density was 2,411.6 inhabitants per square mile (931.1/km^{2}). There were 4,883 housing units at an average density of 974.8 per square mile (376.4/km^{2}). The racial makeup of the city was 97.18% White, 0.15% African American, 0.02% Native American, 2.12% Asian, 0.11% from other races, and 0.42% from two or more races. Hispanic or Latino of any race were 0.76% of the population.

There were 4,787 households, out of which 22.7% had children under the age of 18 living with them, 68.2% were married couples living together, 7.5% had a female householder with no husband present, and 21.5% were non-families. 19.4% of all households were made up of individuals, and 12.3% had someone living alone who was 65 years of age or older. The average household size was 2.52 and the average family size was 2.89.

In the city the population was spread out, with 18.2% under the age of 18, 5.2% from 18 to 24, 23.4% from 25 to 44, 27.4% from 45 to 64, and 25.8% who were 65 years of age or older. The median age was 47 years. For every 100 females, there were 93.1 males. For every 100 females age 18 and over, there were 91.7 males.

The median income for a household in the city was $54,413, and the median income for a family was $62,520. Males had a median income of $44,500 versus $31,047 for females. The per capita income for the city was $25,014. About 2.0% of families and 2.6% of the population were below the poverty line, including 4.0% of those under age 18 and 2.2% of those age 65 or over.

== Notable people ==
- Stephen "Suede" Baum, fashion designer and Project Runway contestant
- Dana Brooke (Ashley Mae Sebera), professional wrestler
- Andrew Carmellini, chef and restaurateur
- John Demjanjuk, convicted Nazi collaborator
- Joe Papp, professional cyclist
- Jack Squirek, former professional football player
- Julian Stanczak, painter and printmaker
