= Austin Scarlett =

American fashion designer and artist (born 1983)

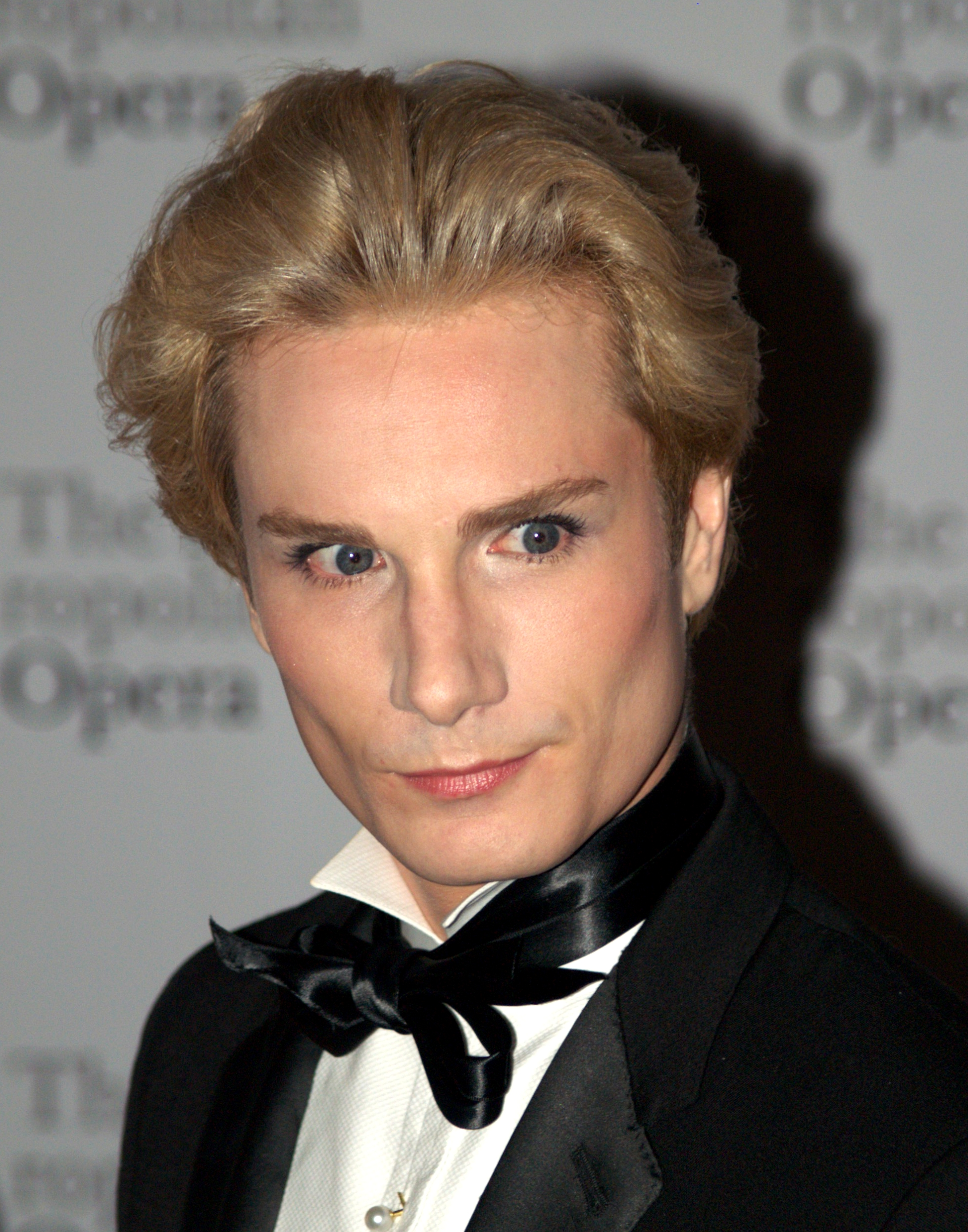
- Scarlett in 2010
- Born: 1983 (age 42–43); Cottage Grove, Oregon
- Education: Fashion Institute of Technology

Austin Scarlett (born 1983) is an American fashion designer and artist known for his appearances on the first season of Project Runway, 2012's Project Runway: All Stars, and his own series, On the Road with Austin and Santino.

== Early life and education ==
Scarlett, son of Debra Little and Christopher Scarlett, was born in Cottage Grove, Oregon. He attended the Fashion Institute of Technology in New York City, where he specialized in couture and evening wear design and received his degree in fashion design. He also received fine arts training at the Art Students League of New York.

== Career ==
While still in school, Scarlett worked as a design assistant and patternmaker on various projects ranging from opera to dance, film, and on Broadway. Scarlett also worked as an assistant costume archivist at The Museum at FIT, with their collection of Haute Couture and textiles.

Scarlett found success on the first season of the Bravo reality show Project Runway in 2004-2005, though was eliminated in the penultimate challenge. During the airing of Project Runway, he became known for his ability to produce glamorous fashions under the tight deadlines and unusual requirements of the competitive reality show. On the very first episode of the program, he created a gown entirely from cornhusks, a design which Tim Gunn as well as each of the three judges later cited as the single most iconic design from the history of the series.

After Project Runway, Scarlett produced couture collections under his own name for fall 2005 and spring 2006.

In January 2006, he joined New York–based bridal-design house Amsale as Creative Director of its luxury gown collection, Kenneth Pool, where he served until 2009.

Scarlett’s involvement as a fashion designer and connoisseur for print and the web include features in The New York Times, Town and Country, Madame Figaro, Elle, In Style, the New York Daily News, and Women’s Wear Daily.

Scarlett and his designs have been featured on episodes of TLC's Say Yes to the Dress.

He has been portrayed on Saturday Night Live by comedian Fred Armisen, in a spoof of Project Runway.

Scarlett has designed theatrical costumes for Shen Wei Dance Arts, performed at the Metropolitan Museum of Art, “Trace” with Aspen Santa Fe Ballet, “Remember Me”, David Parsons Dance as seen on PBS.

In 2010 Scarlett joined season two star Santino Rice in their show On the Road with Austin and Santino. The series premiered July 29, 2010, on the Lifetime network, and followed the pair cross country as they created couture designs using local resources.

Scarlett has also lent his design talents to many charitable causes, including The New York Public Library, New York City Opera, Live Out Loud, Equity Fights AIDS, Women In Need, and others.

In 2012 he returned to the runway in Project Runway: All-Stars, in which he finished as runner-up. In October 2012, Austin Scarlett released his signature collection of wedding and evening dresses. His collection is available at Neiman Marcus and other luxury retailers around the world.

In 2022, Scarlett redesigned the entire cast wardrobe for the Land of Oz theme park in Beech Mountain, North Carolina.
