= Yazzie =

Yazzie is a name, derived from the Navajo word yázhí [jáʒ̊í] meaning "little" and may refer to:

- Yazzie Johnson (born 1946), Navajo jeweler living in northern New Mexico
- Aaron Yazzie (born 1986), Navajo mechanical engineer working at NASA's Jet Propulsion Laboratory
- Allan Yazzie, Navajo educational advocate
- Aneva J. Yazzie, American and Navajo industrial engineer
- Brian Yazzie, known as Yazzie the Chef, Navajo chef
- Cherilyn Yazzie, American and Navajo politician, farmer, and entrepreneur
- Jolene Yazzie (born 1978), Navajo graphic designer in Arizona
- Melanie Yazzie (born 1966), Navajo printmaker, sculptor, and professor in Colorado
- Rhiana Yazzie, Navajo playwright, actor, and filmmaker
- Sybil Yazzie (1916–2002), Navajo painter
- Steven Yazzie (born 1970), Native American artist
