= Retha Walden Gambaro =

American sculptor and gallery owner

Retha Walden Gambaro (December 9, 1917–September 9, 2013) was an American sculptor and gallery owner.

She is known for her own artworks that explore Indigenous American themes and for her curatorial practice that brought attention to contemporary Native American artists of the 20th and 21st centuries. Gambaro advocated for and helped raise funds to establish the National Museum of the American Indian.

== Early and personal life ==
Gambaro was born in Lenna, Oklahoma, to parents she identified as being of Native American descent. She identified her mother as having Muscogee descent and her father was having European and Cherokee descent. She grew up primarily in downtown Phoenix, Arizona, where she and her family moved when she was young. She attended public school through the 8th grade before leaving to support her family. Gambaro worked a variety of jobs including maid, seamstress, and engineering draftsman. She married Stephen A. Gambaro and worked to support him while he completed high school and college. In 1969, after the youngest of her three children left home, Gambaro, with newfound time and an empty nest, began experimenting with art, first, and only briefly, painting and then discovered a passion for sculpting. She enrolled, at the age of 52, in sculpture class at the Corcoran Gallery where she studied with Berthold Schmutzhart until 1971.

== Career and legacy ==
Gambaro's career as an artist spanned late mid-life through old age. She first exhibited her sculpture in 1971 in her mid-fifties and continued sculpting until her mid-eighties. Works by Gambaro in stone, clay, copper, wood and bronze often feature female figures and themes of spirituality and reverence for nature.

Her work has been exhibited at the U.S. National Arboretum, Folger Shakespeare Library, Discovery Park Museum in Seattle, the Suffolk Museum, the Smithsonian National Museum of Natural History, the Gilcrease Museum, the Kennedy Center and the Heard Museum. In 2012, the Heard Museum exhibited a retrospective of Gambaro's work titled "Attitudes of Prayer" including Gambaro's self-portrait, "Acceptance" of a woman holding and looking at a fallen leaf.

=== Via Gambaro Gallery ===
In 1973, Gambaro and her husband purchased a townhouse in Washington, D.C.'s historic Capitol Hill district with the goal of converting its two-story 19th century carriage house into a studio and gallery. Gambaro envisioned filling a void in the art world by creating the first gallery in the U.S. capital dedicated to works by contemporary Native American artists. Via Gambaro Gallery opened in 1976 and became a hub for promoting Native American art and artists.

Exhibitions at the Via Gambaro Gallery highlighted contemporary Native American artists using modern techniques and materials with a goal of undermining stereotypes. Under Gambaro's leadership and in conjunction with her husband Stephen Gambaro a photographer known for portraits of Native Americans, Via Gambaro Gallery showcased the work of many contemporary Native American artists.

In 1977, Via Gambaro Gallery curated and hosted Indian Artists, 1977 with the American Indian Society of Washington, D.C., featuring works by Arthur Amiotte, Benjamin Buffalo, Karita Coffey, Allan Houser, Neil Parsons, Kevin Red Star, and Daniel Nicholas along with works by Gambaro. The gallery's "Indian Artists, 1978" exhibition included works by seven faculty members of the Santa Fe Institute of American Indian Arts. Featured artists included Lawrence Ahvakana, Henry Gobin, and Larry Desjarlais. The gallery's 1980 show featured works by Native American women including Nadema Agard, Pegie Ahvakana, Diane M. Burns, Karita Coffey, Helen Hardin, Joan Hill, Linda Lomahaftewa, Jean McCarty Mauldin, Carol Soatikee, Alice Souligny, Dorothy Strait, and Christine C. Zuni along with works by Gambaro.

=== National Museum of the American Indian ===
As president of the Amerindian Circle of the Smithsonian Institution in 1982, Gambaro organized an exhibition featuring 120 Native American artists. The exhibition was featured at the Kennedy Center in conjunction with a star-studded gala event, Night of the First Americans, to launch the fundraising campaign for the National Museum of the American Indian. After the event, the exhibition moved to the Smithsonian Institution.
