= Linda Lomahaftewa =

Native American printmaker, painter, and educator from New Mexico

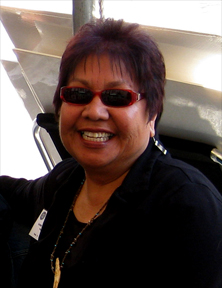
- Linda Lomahaftewa, 2009
- Born: 1947 (age 78–79); Phoenix, Arizona, United States
- Education: San Francisco Art Institute (MFA, BFA), Institute of American Indian Arts
- Known for: Painting, printmaking
- Awards: Robert Rauschenberg Foundation's Power of Art Award (2001), Honorary doctorate (SFAI)
- Website: www.lindalomahaftewa.com

Linda Lomahaftewa (born 1947) is a Native American printmaker, painter, and educator living in Santa Fe, New Mexico. She is a citizen of the Hopi Tribe and a descendant of the Choctaw Nation of Oklahoma.

== Background ==
Linda J. Lomahaftewa was born July 3, 1947, in Phoenix, Arizona. Her father was Hopi; her mother was Choctaw from Oklahoma. Her parents had met at an American Indian boarding school. She and her family lived in Phoenix and Los Angeles, California.

She attended a strict mission boarding school in 1961 but transferred to Phoenix Indian School, then the Institute of American Indian Arts (IAIA) in Santa Fe, New Mexico, in 1962, the year the school opened. Upon graduation from IAIA, Linda earned a scholarship to attend the San Francisco Art Institute in San Francisco, California, along with fellow artists, T.C. Cannon, Kevin Red Star, and Bill Prokopiof. Of the four, only Linda graduated from SFAI. After earning her Bachelor of Fine Arts degree, she went on to earn her Master of Fine Arts degrees at SFAI in 1971.

== Artwork ==
Dawn Reno writes of Linda's work that, "She unites the ancient Indian world with the contemporary in her modernistic paintings and has done a series of abstract landscapes which are considered the most powerful in her body of work." Of her own art, Lomahaftewa writes that her "imagery comes from being Hopi and remembering shapes and colors from ceremonies and from landscape. I associate a special power and respect, a sacredness, with these colors and shapes, and this carries over into my work."

Although best known for her printmaking, Ribbon Shirt, her contribution to the major traveling exhibit, Indian Humor, is a typical contemporary ribbon shirt bedecked with an array of medals, buttons, and award ribbons from various Native American art shows.

In response to viewing the retrospective exhibition of Lomahaftewa's work, The Moving Land: 60+ Years of Art by Linda Lomahaftewa, art writer Michael Abatemarco observed, "The landscape orientation is an ever-present aspect, as is a collage-like use of representational imagery. The show includes rare pieces from the start of her career, like an untitled acrylic photo transfer from the late 1960s that shows the unmistakable likeness of Beatles drummer Ringo Star amidst a confluence of abstract shapes and lines in liquid movement. But a clear division between the swarming shapes and an open upper portion, where more figures take on less vibrant and more corporeal form than those in the lower portion of the composition, suggests the separation of earth and sky."

== Career and honors ==
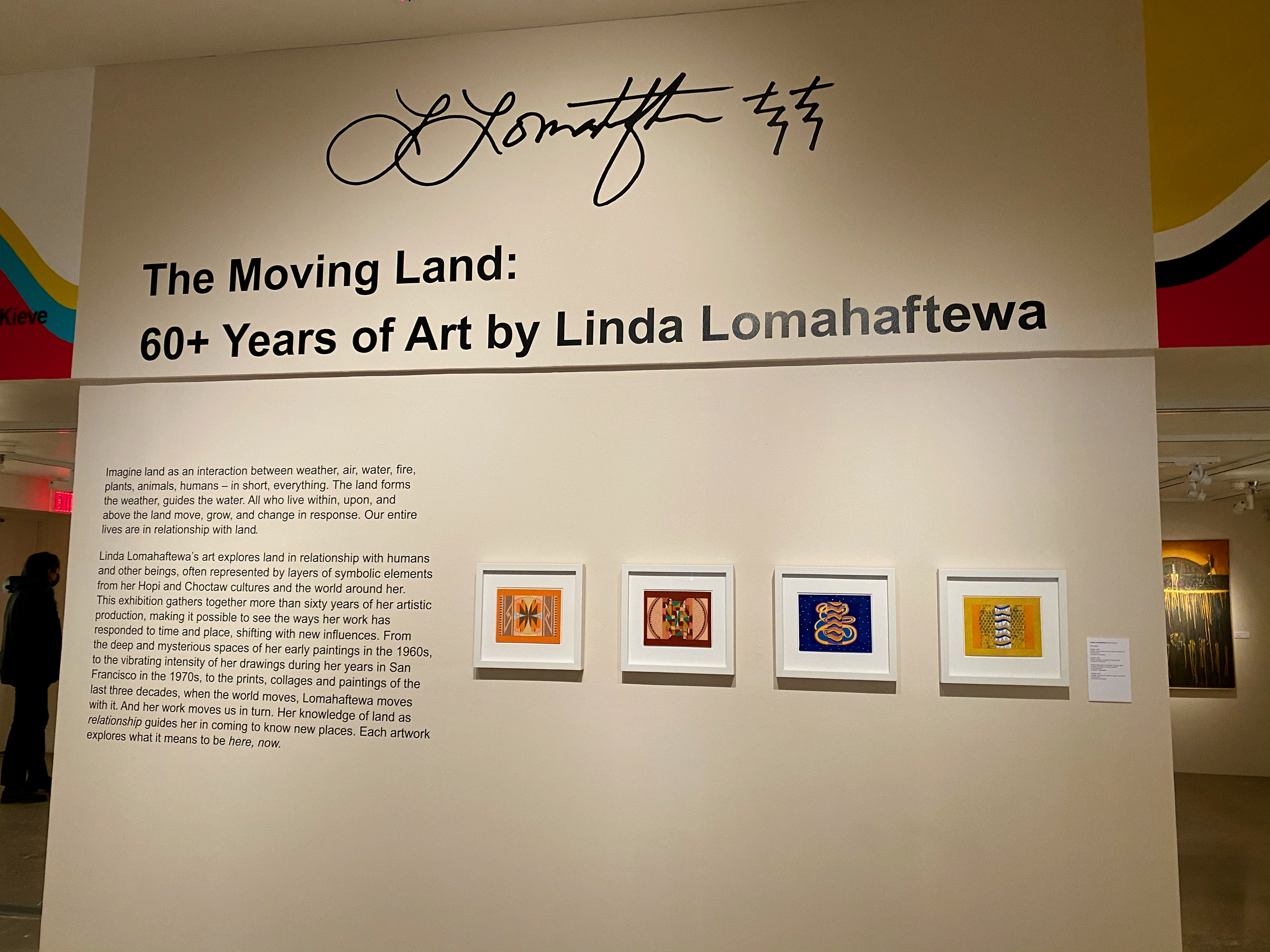
Installation view of the 2021 exhibition of "The Moving Land: 60+ Years of Art by Linda Lomahaftewa" at the IAIA Museum of Contemporary Native Arts in Santa Fe, New Mexico, featuring works created in 2019.

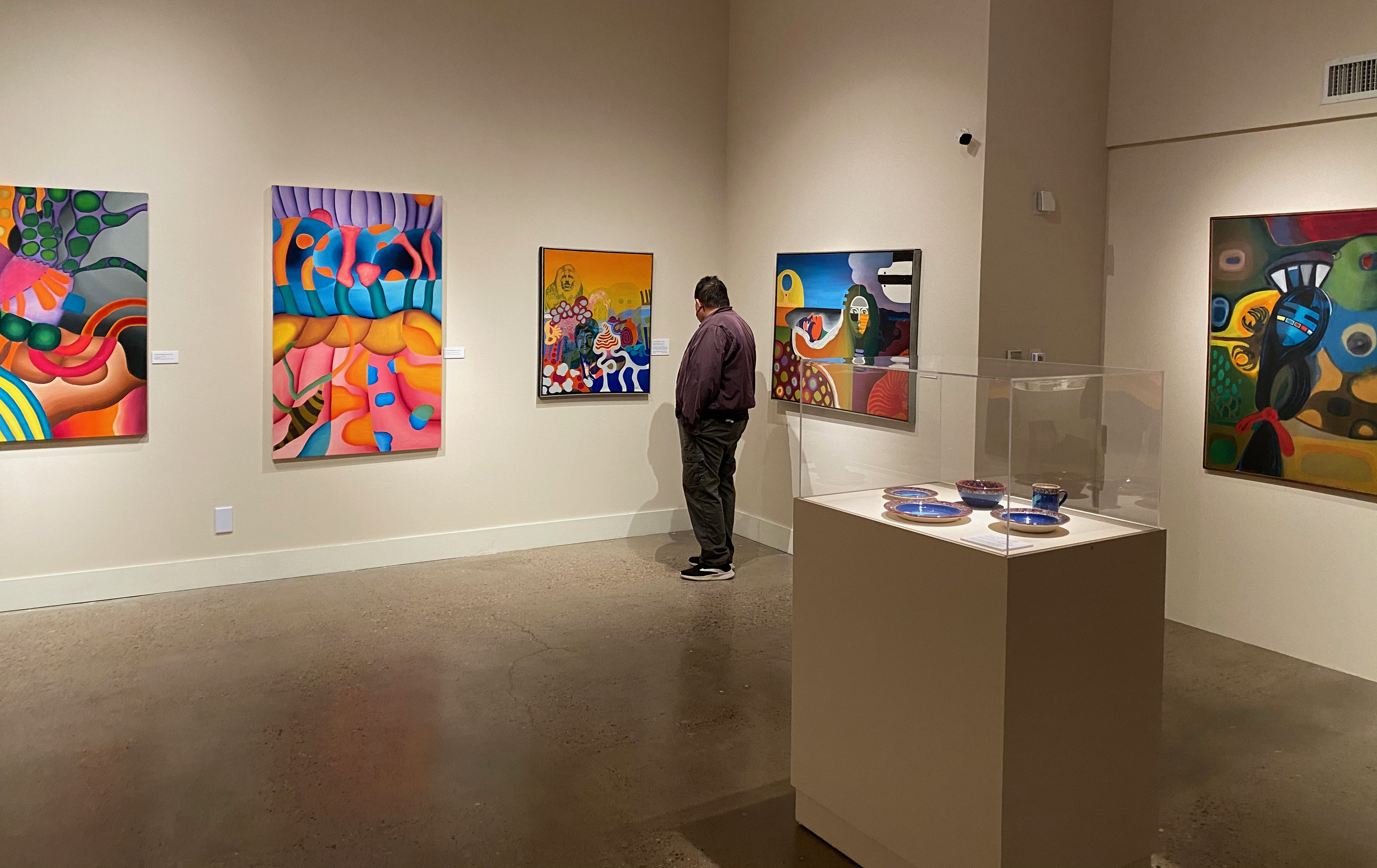
Installation view of the 2021 exhibition of "The Moving Land: 60+ Years of Art by Linda Lomahaftewa" at the IAIA Museum of Contemporary Native Arts in Santa Fe, New Mexico. These paintings were created during the artist's time in San Francisco during the early 1970s.

She has participated in innumerable group and solo exhibits including those at the American Indian Contemporary Art gallery in San Francisco; the Heard Museum in Phoenix; the American Indian Community House in New York City; and the Wheelwright Museum of the American Indian in Santa Fe.

Via Gambaro Gallery, which was launched by Retha Walden Gambaro and Stephen Gambaro to spotlight contemporary Native American artists, included Lomahaftewa's work in its 1980 National American Indian Women's Art Show.

She was listed in the 8th Edition of the International Who's Who in 1984. Her work can be found in such public collections at the Heard Museum, Phoenix, Arizona; the Wheelwright Museum of the American Indian, Santa Fe, New Mexico; the Millicent Rogers Museum, Taos, New Mexico; the US Department of the Interior, Indian Arts and Crafts Board, Washington, DC; the Southern Plains Indian Museum, Anadarko, Oklahoma; the University of Lethbridge, Alberta, Canada; the Native American Center for the Living Arts, Niagara Falls, New York; and the Center for the Arts of Indian America, Washington, DC.

Linda began teaching at Sonoma State University and later at the University of California, Berkeley. In 1976, she accepting a position teaching two-dimensional studio arts at the Institute of American Indian Arts, where she taught for more than forty years before retiring.

"I'm happy that I'm recognized as a Native woman artist," she was quoted as saying. "And that I'm still doing work after all this time. A lot of people give up."

Linda Lomahaftewa was selected as an Institute of American Indian Arts Artist-in-Residence in the autumn of 2020. As a safety measure, the college arranged a studio for the artist off-campus at Vital Spaces to reduce exposure risks of COVID-19. She produced a new work during the residency, many of which were included in her retrospective exhibition at the IAIA Museum of Contemporary Native Arts (2021), in Santa Fe. Art historian and critic Michelle J. Lanteri wrote of the new paintings, "One work, Healing Prayers for a Pandemic Universe (2020) evokes hope through gestural webs of yellow, purple, blue, and gold embedded in a night sky. Through these pathways, the painting offers new possibilities in the current social landscape that's redefining its future within each fluid moment. Indicated by the painting's title, Lomahaftewa wishes healing for all people. While speaking with her, she reflected on this composition. "It made me think of how a prayer would look—just things in motion.'"

Linda Lomahaftewa was a participant in the Smithsonian Archives of American Art Pandemic Oral History Project in September 2020. The oral history series recorded responses to the global pandemic across the American art world. Conducted virtually, the Pandemic Oral History Project featured eighty-five short-form interviews with a diverse group of artists, teachers, curators, and administrators, including Linda Lomahaftewa.

== Personal ==
Linda has a son, Logan L. Slock, and a daughter, Tatiana Lomahaftewa-Singer, who is the curator of collections at the IAIA Museum of Contemporary Native Arts. Her brother, the late Dan Lomahaftewa (1951–2005), was also a celebrated artist. Her first cousins Roger and Marcus Amerman are internationally known Choctaw beadworkers.

== Notable exhibitions ==
- 2024: “Linda Lomahaftewa: The San Francisco Years, Paintings 1965 through 1972 and Recent Works 2008 through 2024, Fresno Art Museum, Fresno, CA.
- 2024: Space Makers: Indigenous Expression and a New American Art, Crystal Bridges Museum of American Art, Bentonville, AR
- 2023–24: The Land Carries Our Ancestors: Contemporary Art by Native Americans, National Gallery of Art, Washington, DC
- 2021: The Moving Land: 60+ Years of Art by Linda Lomahaftewa, IAIA Museum of Contemporary Native Arts, Santa Fe, NM
- 2012: Low-Rez: Native American Lowbrow Art, Eggman and Walrus Art Emporium, Santa Fe, NM
- 2012: Octopus Dreams: 200 Works on Paper by Native American Artists, Ekaterinburg Museum of Fine Arts

== Public collections ==
- Heard Museum
- Marcus Amerman
- Museum of Contemporary Native Arts
- Millicent Rogers Museum
- National Gallery of Art, Washington, DC
- Wheelwright Museum of the American Indian
