= Sundance Institute =

American non-profit organisation

- Formation: 1981; 45 years ago
- Founder: Robert Redford
- Type: Nonprofit
- Headquarters: Park City, Utah; Los Angeles, California; New York City
- Location: United States
- Fields: Film, filmmaking, independent film
- Official language: English
- Website: sundance.org

The Sundance Institute is a non-profit organization founded by actor Robert Redford committed to the aesthetic growth and promotion of independent artists. The institute is driven by its programs that discover and support independent filmmakers, theatre artists and composers from all over the world. At the core of the programs is the goal to introduce audiences to the artists' new work, aided by the institute's labs, granting and mentorship programs that take place throughout the year in the United States and internationally.

The institute has offices in Park City, Los Angeles, and New York City, and provides creative and financial support to emerging and aspiring filmmakers, directors, producers, film composers, screenwriters, playwrights and theatre artists through a series of Labs and fellowships. The programs of Sundance Institute include the Sundance Film Festival, which is critically acclaimed. It promotes independent filmmakers, storytellers, and composers.

== History ==
The institute was founded by Robert Redford, who already had experience in organizing film festivals through his collaborations with Utah State Film Commission to promote what was then called the Utah/US Film Festival. The Sundance Institute's founding staff, assembled in the spring of 1980, included Executive Director Sterling Van Wagenen, director of film development programs Jenny Walz Selby, and director of development Jon Lear. Frank Daniel was secured as artistic director. This staff produced the first Filmmakers Lab in June 1981, which fortuitously followed the Academy Awards at which Ordinary People (the directorial debut of Robert Redford) won numerous awards, including Best Picture. Michelle Satter joined the staff in June 1981 and subsequently opened up the Los Angeles office of the institute.

The Sundance Institute's 1981 founding board of trustees included Robert Redford, Sterling VanWagenen, Robert E. Gipson, Ian Calderon, Robert Geller, George White, Irving Azoff, Saul Bass, Ian Cumming, Frank Daniel, Christopher Dodd, Moctesuma Esparza, Dr. Robert Gray, Alan Jacobs, Karl Malden, Mary McFadden, Mike Medavoy, Victor Nunez, Wayne Owens, Sydney Pollack, Gilbert Shelton, Annick Smith, Anthony Thomopoulos, Claire Townsend, and Robert Townsend. The first six listed were also members of the executive committee. In 2010, Keri Putnam was named executive director.

In 1985, the Sundance Institute assumed management of the fledgling United States Film Festival, which had been experiencing financial problems. The institute hired Tony Safford from the AFI Kennedy Center program as managing director and renamed the festival.

The institute started off with its Feature Film Program and Film Music Program (revived later in 1994) in the 1980s, then went on to include other programs such as the Native American and Indigenous Film Program in 1994, the theatre program in 1997, the documentary dilm program in 2002, the New Frontier program in 2007, the Creative Producing Initiative in 2008, the Episodic Storytelling Initiative in 2014, Sundance Ignite, a program for young filmmakers, in 2015, and the Creative Distribution Initiative (an extension of the Creative Producing Initiative) in 2017.

At the U.S. Film Festival, after Sundance Institute took over in 1985, there were 85 films shown at two theatres in Park City with a staff of 13. In January 2017 at the present-day Sundance Film Festival, 181 films were shown at nine Park City theatres with a staff of 224 and 71,600 attendees.

Robert Redford died in 2025.

Following the 2026 Sundance Film Festival, the Sundance Film Festival would locate to Boulder Colorado. In spite of the festival's relocation, the Sundance Institute shall maintain its Utah headquarters in Park City, with the Sundance Institute Labs also remaining at the Sundance resort.

== Sundance Institute Programs ==
=== Feature Film Program ===
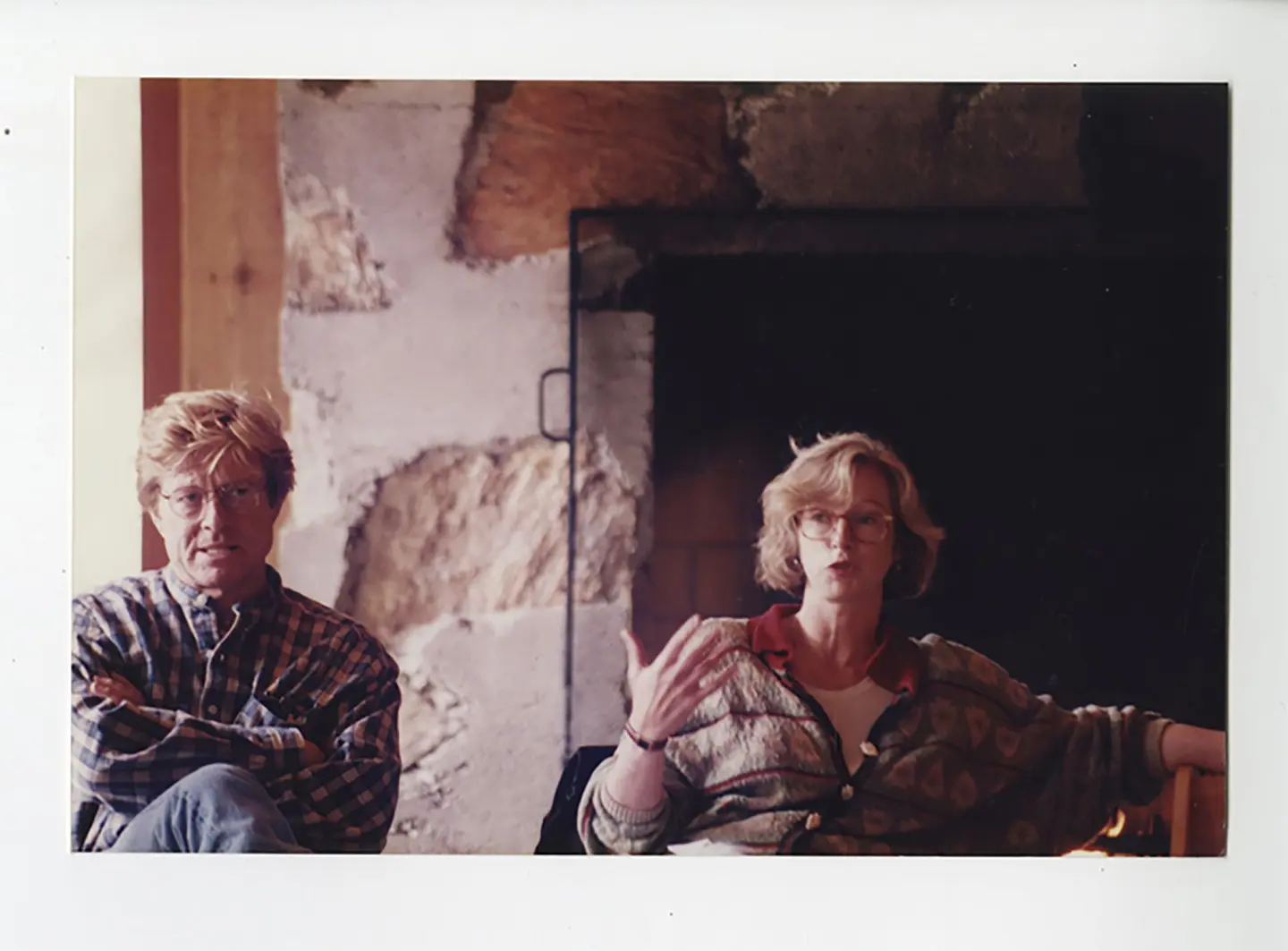
Robert Redford & Michelle Satter at Sundance’s first June Filmmakers Lab 1981

For three weeks each June in Sundance, Utah, Directors Lab Fellows rehearse, shoot and edit four to six scenes from their screenplays under the mentorship of accomplished directors, editors, cinematographers and actors who serve as Creative Advisors.

In addition to the creative support offered through Labs and workshops, Sundance Institute helps independent filmmakers complete their work through various grants and fellowships. Many of these opportunities are designated for filmmakers selected to participate in the institute's Feature Film Program.

=== Film Music Program ===
The Sundance Institute Composers Lab, held every summer at the Skywalker Sound studio in Marin County, California, aims to enhance the role of music in independent film.

Composers Lab Alumni include Bijan Olia, Cindy O'Connor, Sergei Stern, Jackson Greenberg, Camilla Uboldi, Jesi Nelson, Adam Schoenberg, Rebecca Dale, Ryan Rumery, and Darryl Jones.

Composers Lab Advisors in 2017 include James Newton Howard, Harry Gregson-Williams, Thomas Newman, George Clinton, Miriam Cutler, Laura Karpman, Doreen Ringer-Ross, Christopher Beck, Todd Boekelheide, Dennis Leonard, Bob Edwards, Pete Horner, Malcolm Fife, Bonnie Wild, David Accord, Adam Smalley, Miguel Arteta, Robb Moss, Amir Bar-Lev, Toby Shimin and Jon Burlingame.

The Music Cafe is a night club venue for rock, singer-songwriters, folk, country, and hip hop on Main Street in Park City during the Sundance Film Festival. Music Cafe daytime programming, produced by ASCAP, has featured such artists as India.Arie, Peter Gabriel, The Black Eyed Peas, Suzanne Vega, Sweet Pea Atkinson, Was (Not Was) and many others.

=== Native American and Indigenous Film Program ===
The Native American and Indigenous Film Program facilitates the participation of Native and Indigenous artists in the institute's artistic development programs and the Sundance Film Festival. To date, the Initiative has facilitated the participation of many Native artists into the Sundance Film Festival, the Independent Producers Conference, and the institute's Feature Film Program. In 2008 the Initiative expanded its focus to include outreach to documentarians, theatre artists, and musicians seeking financial and creative support through the Sundance Institute Documentary Fund, the Theatre Program, and the Film Music Program. The Sundance Film Festival provides a world stage for compelling and innovative films by Native American and Indigenous filmmakers. The Festival also hosts the annual Native Forum, a program of panel discussions, filmmaker workshops, and networking events that provide opportunities for indigenous filmmakers to share their expertise and knowledge with each other and the larger independent film community. The Native American and Indigenous Program is supported by the W.K. Kellogg Foundation, Surdna Foundation, Time Warner Foundation, Ford Foundation, Native Arts and Cultures Foundation, SAGindie, Comcast-NBCUniversal, the John S. and James L. Knight Foundation, Academy of Motion Picture Arts and Sciences, the Embassy of Australia, Indigenous Media Initiatives, Taika Waititi, The White Feather Foundation, Fenton Bailey and Billy Luther, and Pacific Islanders in Communications.

From 1994 to 2004, the Film Festival presented Native films as part a dedicated screening category. The Festival began incorporating Native and Indigenous films into its official film program in 2005.

Over the course of its history, the Sundance Film Festival has showcased a range of work by Native and Indigenous filmmakers including dramatic films like Sterlin Harjo's Four Sheets to the Wind, Sherman Alexie's The Business of Fancydancing, Chris Eyre's Smoke Signals, Rachel Perkins' One Night the Moon, and Willi White's Miye, Unkiye; documentaries such as Heather Rae's Trudell, Tom Murray and Allan Collins' Dhakiyarr vs. the King, and Merata Mita's Hotere; and short films like Gabriel Lopez-Shaw and Sherwin Bitsui's Chrysalis, Taika Waititi's Two Cars, One Night, Katie Doane Tulugaq Avery's Mama Dragon, and Shane McSauby's Mino Bimaadiziwin.

=== Theatre Program ===
The Theatre Program, under the direction of Philip Himberg, supports the development of independent theatre. Lab Alumni and projects include Tanya Barfield's Blue Door, Adam Guettel and Craig Lucas' The Light in the Piazza, Lisa Kron's Well, Jessica Hagedorn's Dogeaters, Stew's Passing Strange, Steven Sater and Duncan Sheik's Spring Awakening, Moisés Kaufman's The Laramie Project, Doug Wright's I Am My Own Wife, Darko Tresnjak's A Gentleman's Guide to Love and Murder, and Lisa Kron and Jeanine Tesori's Fun Home.

The Theatre Labs take place at the Sundance Resort in Utah, other U.S. cities, and internationally. Projects rehearse every other day to give playwrights adequate time for rewrites. There is no physically controllable space, such as a 'black box.' Although lighting and scenic production values are not available, designers have sometimes participated as part of the development of the projects text. When a project is accepted into the Lab, it is assigned a Sundance dramaturg who, in collaboration with the Producing Artistic Director, will work with that project prior to the Theatre Lab residency period.

The Sundance Playwright's Retreat at Ucross, Wyoming is an eighteen-day writing colony where five playwrights and a composer convene each year and where a Sundance dramaturg can respond to work at an early stage of the creative process. Like the other two Labs, the Ucross Retreat includes both emerging and established artists.

Artists are selected by invitation only.

In May 2016, Sundance Institute had its first Theatre Lab in the MENA (Middle East and North Africa) region, in the Ourika Valley of Morocco.

=== Documentary Film Program ===
The Sundance Documentary Film Program assists nonfiction filmmakers from around the world with a series of workshops in editing, storytelling, and scoring for documentary films as well as providing grants to nonfiction film projects through the Sundance Documentary Fund. The Sundance Institute Documentary Film Program provides year-round support to nonfiction contemporary-issue filmmakers internationally. The program encourages the exploration of innovative nonfiction storytelling, and promotes the exhibition of documentary films to a broader audience. It supports independent artists both domestically and internationally through the Sundance Documentary Fund, the Documentary Composers Laboratory and Edit and Story Laboratory, panels at the Filmmakers Lodge at the Sundance Film Festival and the Sundance Independent Producers Conference, and a variety of collaborative international documentary initiatives.

The Documentary Fund was established at Sundance Institute in 2002 with a gift from the Open Society Institute and is supported by a leadership grant from the Ford Foundation.

Documentary Fund grants are announced once a year. In 2016, the institute awarded over $1 million to artists for their documentary projects and global nonfiction storytelling.

=== New Frontier ===
Launched in 2007, the New Frontier Labs and residency programs foster the works of boundary-pushing artists and technologists, marked by its central themes of innovation and unconventionalism. The New Frontier exhibition at Sundance Film Festival provides a curation of such works in the emerging field through the incorporation of fiction, non-fiction, and a mix of the two, to showcase transmedia storytelling, multimedia installations, performances and films.

At the 2017 Sundance Film Festival, the New Frontier lineup included the US premiere of Jem Cohen's film Museum Hours and documentary World Without End (No Reported Incidents), live multimedia performances, virtual reality segments, and immersive installations, among other projects.

=== Creative Producing Initiative ===
Developed in 2008 as an initiative to support the next generation of independent producers, the Creative Producing Labs and fellowships is a 5-day long Lab that focuses on the producer as a whole. With the help of experienced advisors, Creative Producing Fellows have the chance to explore their own take on cinematic material and to equip themselves with the skills and experience necessary in the scripting and editing stages of a filmic piece. Past Creative Advisors include producers Anthony Bregman (Eternal Sunshine of the Spotless Mind), Heather Rae (Frozen River), Mary Jane Skalski (Mysterious Skin), Jay Van Hoy (American Honey), and more.

Recent Creative Producing Fellows and their Feature Film works include Annie Silverstein's Bull, Cesar Cervantes' Hot Clip, Hannah Utt's Stupid Happy, Nick Bentgen's Dey'Dey and his Brothers, Gabriella Moses' Leche, and Pippa Bianco's Share.

=== Episodic Storytelling Initiative ===
Initiated in 2014 as a result of the substantial growth of opportunities made present by the demand of more serial content for online and television platforms, the Episodic Storytelling Initiative gives writers the chance to refine their episodic-writing/producing skills. The institute offers a year-round program of Episodic Story Labs for 10 writers (or co-writing teams) to work with accomplished showrunners, non-writing creative producers, and studio and network executives.

According to the institute's founder, Robert Redford, "Sundance Institute has always worked to develop and support a next generation of independent artists. As more of those artists look to the opportunities in television and online platforms, it is only natural that we expand our labs to address the unique needs of serialized work."

=== Sundance Ignite ===
Partnered with Adobe's Project 1324 contest, Sundance Ignite launched in 2015 as a short film challenge for young filmmakers ages 18 to 24. The entrants can win the Ignite Ticket Package, which is an exclusive chance to see the newest films at the upcoming Sundance Film Festival, and the Ignite Fellows Program, a year-round Festival and industry experience. Sundance Ignite also puts on Ignite On Tour, a traveling component designed for the winners to engage with Institute staff and alumni.

The Sundance Ignite program is supported by Adobe Project 1324, S.I. Newhouse School of Public Communications, the College of Visual Performing Arts at Syracuse University, and Chapman University.

=== Creative Distribution Initiative ===
The Creative Distribution Initiative (CDI), part of the Creative Producing Initiative, is the institute's newest program inaugurated in 2017. Through online resources, workshops, and a network of organizations, CDI empowers filmmakers by teaching them the ever-changing ins and outs of what it takes to distribute and market independent film. For the Sundance Institute alumni, CDI also offers free consultations on Kickstarter campaigns. Their first release under this initiative was the 2017 film Columbus.

== Sundance Collection at UCLA ==
The institute maintains the Sundance Collection at UCLA (University of California, Los Angeles) to conserve and archive the history of independent film. Film preservation is an especially pressing need in independent cinema. Despite attributed historical, artistic and cultural value, good prints of many indie films – including some made within the past decade – no longer exist. Chemical decomposition, neglect, and the changing ownership of film libraries have caused these prints to disappear.

To create a living record of the history of independent film, Sundance Institute and UCLA Film and Television Archive initiated the Sundance Collection at UCLA in 1997, and with contributions from studios and distributors as well as hundreds of individual filmmakers, the Collection's holdings have grown to include over 300 film prints. The archive represents a diversity of work from the Sundance Film Festival as well as projects developed through the Sundance Labs. From features to documentaries to shorts, prints in the Collection include Sex, Lies, and Videotape, Reservoir Dogs, The Living End, Smoke Signals, Amores Perros, Harlan County, USA, Love & Basketball, and Welcome to the Dollhouse, among many other works that might otherwise no longer exist.

The Collection also provides a central resource for the study of independent film, containing a rare assemblage of material related to the history of independent cinema, including press kits and filmmaker interviews.
