= Imogene Goodshot Arquero =

Oglala Lakota beadwork artist

Imogene Goodshot Arquero is an Oglala Lakota beadwork artist from South Dakota, who lives in Santa Fe, New Mexico.

== Personal ==
Imogene Jessie Goodshot Arquero is the great-great-granddaughter of the Oglala Lakota war chief, Crazy Horse (c. 1840–1877). She is married to painter Dominic Arquero (Cochiti Pueblo).

== Art career ==
Imogene Arquero is known for her beadwork, in which she combines historic techniques with forms from mainstream culture such as tennis shoes and baseball caps. She began her career as beadwork artist, working in classical Northern Plains styles before experimenting with new forms.

The artist taught "Traditional Techniques" at the Institute of American Indian Arts in Santa Fe in the 1970s.

Arquero participated in Women of Sweetgrass, Cedar and Sage, a 1985 traveling exhibition of contemporary Native women artists curated by Harmony Hammond and Jaune Quick-to-See Smith. She has also exhibited in Santa Fe Indian Market.

== Public collections ==
Arquero's work is held by the Fenimore Art Museum, among other institutions.
