= Nadema Agard =

American visual artist from New York (born 1948)

- Born: September 10, 1948 (age 78); New York City, New York
- Citizenship: American
- Education: New York University; Columbia University; Università Cattolica di Milano of Rome, Italy; Aegina Arts Centre
- Awards: National Endowment for the Arts Fellowship, 1987-1988
- Website: nademaagard.com/gallery/index.html

Nadema Ivania Agard, who also uses the name Winyan Luta Red Woman, (born September 10, 1948) is an American visual artist, educator, illustrator, poet, storyteller, museum professional and an activist for Indigenous rights. Agard also works as a consultant on repatriation, multicultural arts, and Native American arts and cultures. Additionally, Agard owns and directs an art production and consulting enterprise, Red Earth Studio.

Agard's art is primarily mixed media visual arts, ranging from canvas paintings, sketches, and published works and her intent is to show the relations of femininity and masculinity in various mixed medias. Her goal is also to represent the merging of cultures races, religions, and traditions together, as well as to serve as a form of visual worship.

== Early and personal life ==
Agard was born and raised in New York, where she has lived most of her life. Agard was exposed to art at a very young age, as her father was a portrait artist and muralist. She has credited this constant exposure to art as an early inspiration for her choice to create art herself. Agard grew up in New York, where she has family.

Agard is of Lakota, Powhatan, and Cherokee ancestry.

In the early 2000s, Agard was diagnosed with breast cancer, but she overcame it. She took a hiatus from making art until creating Moon Breast Mother in 2003.

She lives in her hometown of New York City.

== Education ==
In June 1970, Agard earned a bachelor of science degree in art education from New York University. Three years later, she continued her education in New York and completed a master's program, earning a master of art degree in art in education at Columbia University, Teacher’s College in December 1973. Between the years of living in New York and pursuing higher education, Agard spent two summers studying in Europe. At the Università Cattolica di Milano of Rome, Italy, in Summer 1969, Agard studied Renaissance art and Architecture. And in Greece at the Aegina Arts Centre, she studied fine arts through Summer 1972.

== Career ==
After earning her first degree in art and education, Agard began to teach art in the New York City Public School system for 15 years on and off. In 1975, Holiday House of New York published a children's book, ChiChi HooHoo Bogey Man, written by Virginia Dewing Hawk and illustrated by Agard.

In 1979, Agard begin exhibiting her work. Via Gambaro Gallery, which was launched by Retha Walden Gambaro and Stephen Gambaro to spotlight contemporary Native American artists, included Agard's work in its 1980 National American Indian Women's Art Show.

In 1981, she left teaching to run the Native arts program, "So the Spirit Flows" at the Museum of the American Indian until 1988 when she received a NEA Fellowship to eventually publish her Southeastern Native Arts Directory at Bemidji State University in Minnesota where she was an adjunct professor of studio arts and art education. From 1995 to 1997 she became the Repatriation Director for the Standing Rock Sioux Tribe and in the early 2000s, she accepted the position of Community Outreach Specialist for the Smithsonian's National Museum of the American Indian. After leaving the museum, Agard has taken several roles as a guest curator, and has used her time to give lectures and create artwork. She continued to serve as a lecturer for the New York Council for the Humanities for many years. She continued to give lectures and curate at various universities and museums locally and nationally.

== Artworks ==
=== Our Lady of Guadalakota ===
Our Lady of Guadalakota is a sepia pencil drawing by Agard created in 1997 that symbolizes the fusion of the Mesoamerica goddess Tonantzin, also seen as the Virgin of Guadalupe, with the Sacred White Buffalo Calf Woman of the Lakota people.

=== Moon Breast Mother: An Installation ===
Moon Breast Mother: An Installation is a mixed-media soft sculpture that includes acrylic paint on a canvas. It consists of ten pieces and each square is 12 by 12 inches.

Agard created the work in 2003 after she overcame breast cancer. She created each of the moons to be a soft sculpture that reflects a woman’s body in many phases and per Patricia Janis Broder, shows the ongoing theme of her art that highlights female genitalia in a more open perspective. After showing this piece in a solo exhibition in 2003, Agard now keeps the ten-piece installation in her home in New York.

=== Wampum Moons of Change ===
Wampum Moons of Change is a 12-piece installation, with a similar format to her piece “Moon Breast Mother”. It was created in 2009 for the Staten Island Museum collection, “CONTACT 1609”. This is also a soft sculpture mixed media piece on a canvas with acrylic paint. Each piece of this installation is a 12”x12” square, each with a different symbol that represents both Native American and Dutch cultures. Purple and creme paints are displayed through each square, each containing images including shells, corn, various animals, and even writing that says “half moon”. None of the twelve images repeat, and hanging below the twelve-piece installation is a sweet grass braid with purple ribbon.

== Publications ==
- "Art as a Vehicle for Empowerment" in Voices of Color: Art and Society in the Americas (1997, edited by Phoebe Farris-Dufrene)
- The Chichi Hoohoo Bogeyman (illustrations, 2008)
- National Museum of the American Indian: Native Artists in the Americas (Brief introduction/guide to interpreting and understanding the art she created while in the program of this museum.)

== Exhibitions ==
Nadema Agard has had her work in various solo and group exhibitions since 1979. The majority of her work was found in group exhibitions in New York, Minnesota, Arizona and nationwide.

=== Solo exhibitions ===
- 1992: “Sacred Door”, Woodland Pattern Gallery, Milwaukee, WI
- 1993: “Door to Heaven-Door From Heaven”, Gustavus Adolphus College, Schaefer Gallery, St. Peter, MN
- 1994: “She is the Four Directions”, University of Minnesota, Duluth, MN
- 1997: “Starblanket Heaven”, Bismarck Art Gallery Association, Bismarck, ND
- 2003: “Parfleche Visions and Moon Breast Mothers”, New Century Artists, New York

=== Group exhibitions ===
- 1979: “Invitational 79”, Gallery of the American Indian Community House, Soho, NY
- 1980: “National American Indian Women’s Art Show”, Via Gambaro Gallery, Washington, D.C.
- 1980: “So the Spirit Flows”, Museum of the American Indian, New York
- 1980: “At the Edge of the Woodlands”, Native American Center for the Living Arts, Niagara Falls, NY
- 1980: “Voices Expressing What Is: Action Against Racism in the Arts”, Westbeth Gallery, New York
- 1981: “Invitational 81”, Gallery of the American Indian Community House, Soho, NY
- 1981: “Visions of the Earth”, Native American Rights Fund Annual Show, Boulder, CO
- 1981: Gallery of the 21st Century, Santa Fe, NM
- 1981: “Four Directions”, Gallery for the American Indian Community House, Soho, NY
- 1981: “Night of the First Americans”, Atrium Gallery, Kennedy Center, Washington, D.C
- 1981: “Native Americans, the Women and Their Art”, NYU Contemporary Art Gallery, New York
- 1982: “Native Women Artists”, Gallery of the American Indian Community House, Soho
- 1983: “Twenty Six Horses Gallery”, Soho, NY
- 1984: “Artistas Indigenas Traveling Exhibit”, Portland, OR
- 1984: “WE ARE THE SEVENTH GENERATION”, Native American Indian Media Corporation traveling exhibit, Atlanta, GA
- 1986: “The Artist and the Spiritual Quest”, Women’s Caucus for the Art, Soho
- 1986: “Riders with No Horse”, Gallery of the American Indian Community House, Soho, NY
- 1987: “Native America: Life, Legend and Art”, Trenton, NJ
- 1988: “A National Women of Color Artist Book Exhibition”, Houston, TX
- 1989: “A National Women of Color Artist Book Project”, Center for Book Arts Coast to Coast, Soho, NY
- 1990: “Ancestors Known and Unknown-Boxworks”, Arts in General, Coast to Coast, Tribeca, NY
- 1991: “All Over the Map: Women and Place”, Moorhead, MN
- 1991: “Manhattan Days: Prairie Daze”, Bemidji Community Art Center, a two-person installation/exhibition, Bemidji, MN
- 1992: “Visual Arts Faculty Exhibition”, Talley Gallery of Bemidji State University, Bemidji, MN
- 1992: “Earth Art: Visions and Interpretations of Nature Through Environmentally Sensitive Art”, Associated Artists of Winston-Salem, Winston-Salem, NC
- 1993: “Visual Arts Faculty”, Talley Gallery of Bemidji State University, Bemidji, MN
- 1993: “Retablos-Latino Icons,” United Community Center Gallery of the Americas, Milwaukee, WI
- 1994: “Gathering Medicine Exhibition”, Art in General, Coast to Coast-Women of Color in the Arts, Tribeca, NY
- 1994: “World's Women On-Line coordinated by Muriel Magenta,” United Nations Fourth World Conference on Women in Beijing, China, Visual Arts Coordinator, Institute for Studies in the Arts, Arizona State University, Tempe, Arizona
- 1994: “Native Survival: Response to HIV/AIDS”, Heard Museum, Phoenix, AZ
- 1994: “Native Survival: Response to HIV/AIDS”, Hartwick College, Oneonta, NY
- 1994: “Virgin of Guadalupe Is the Corn Mother, a Multimedia Work”, Arizona State University, Tempe, AZ
- 1996: “Native Survival: Response to HIV/AIDS”, Two Rivers Gallery, Minneapolis, MN
- 1996: “American Indian College Fund Gala Auction”, Waldorf Astoria Hotel, New York
- 1996: “Voices of Color”, Purdue University Gallery, West Lafayette, IN
- 1996: “Frida Kahlo, Modern Portraits of Modern Idon”, Frasier Gallery, Georgetown, Washington D.C.
- 1997: “Piecevvorks”, Studio Museum in Harlem, New York
- 1999 - 1998: “Metaphors: Art Inspired By Everyday Objects and Folklore”, New York
- 2000: “Mother Love: Native Women and the Land”, New York Gallery of the American Indian Community House, New York
- 2002 - 2001: “Who is the Virgin of Guadalupe? Women Artists Crossing Borders”, Henry Street Settlement Abrons Art Center, New York
- 2002: “Stories from the Circle: Science and Native Wisdom”, The Ned Hatathli Museum, Diné College, Tsaile, AZ
- 2003: “Native American Artists/Scholars: Speaking for Ourselves in the 21st” Gallery of the American Indian Community House, New York
- 2004: “Native Views: Influences of Modern Culture”, Artrain U.S.A. (Traveling Show 2004-2007)
- 2005: “Impacted Nations”, Honor the Earth (Traveling Show 2005-2008)
- 2005-2006: “An Artistic Perspective, Lady Liberty as a Native American Icon”, Gallery of Ellis Island Immigration Museum, New York
- 2005: “New York Mix: Art of the Five Civilized Boroughs” Gallery of the American Indian Community House, New York
- 2008-2007: “¡FRIJOLITOS!: A SMALL WORKS EXHIBITION”, Raices Taller 222 Art Gallery & Workshop, Tucson, AZ
- 2009: “Contact 1609” Staten Island Museum, Staten Island
- 2009: “The Importance of in/visibility, Abrazo Interno Gallery, New York
- 2015: “How to Catch Eel and Grow Corn”, Wilmer Jennings Gallery, New York

== Collections ==
- American Indian Community House Gallery (AICH Gallery): Cultural Center in the Lower Manhattan Area
- Powhatan Museum: is located in the historic Mt. Pleasant neighborhood (Washington DC)

== Honors and awards ==
- (2003) Ingrid Washinawatok Award for Community Activism: Ingrid Washinawatok was an activist and Native leader before being murdered on a trip to Columbia to work with indigenous groups. The award is given in her honor, and in 2003 Nadema Agard was the recipient.
- (1997) Smithsonian Institution American Indian Museum Studies Scholarship.
- (1988) Scholar-in-Residence at the Phelps Stokes Institute
- (1987-1988) National Endowment for the Arts Fellowship
