= Gina Gray =

American painter

Gina Gray (Osage name: Pa-Pe Son-tse): (1954 – 20 December 2014) was an Osage artist born in Pawhuska, Oklahoma, to Andrew and Margaret Gray. She was the great-granddaughter of Henry Roan Horse. She is one of the most renowned Native American contemporary artists of the past three decades, having won awards from and held exhibits at many museums and art shows throughout Indian Country.

== Wounded Knee Occupation ==
While a high school student in 1973, Gray hitchhiked to Wounded Knee to participate in the 71-day occupation with a team of 200 Oglala Lakota activists and members of the American Indian Movement. The protest, intent on calling attention to failed government treaty agreements, poverty, racial tension, and conditions on the Pine Ridge Reservation, was the longest-running act of civil disobedience in US history.

One of Gray's sisters, Mary BigHorse, was married to a high-ranking AIM member, Henry Wahwassauk. Two brothers, Andrew Gray and Louis Gray, met up with Gina in Denver and they made their way to a South Dakota safe house, where BigHorse was waiting, outside the occupation area. Under cover of darkness, they entered the compound, where they remained for the next month. Electricity, water and food supplies were cut off by federal marshals and national guardsmen in an attempt to break the standoff. Under heavy gunfire, Frank Clearwater, a Cherokee, and Buddy LaMonte, an Oglala Lakota, were killed. Gina and her brother Louis decided to leave, were smuggled out, and were reunited with their father in the safe house.

== Education ==
After escaping from Wounded Knee, Gray and her brother Louis returned to finish high school at the Institute of American Indian Arts in Santa Fe, New Mexico. After graduating from IAIA, she studied commercial art the California Institute of the Arts.

== Art career ==
Gray's work was characterized by bold, bright colors of mixed-media, which incorporate traditional images of her Osage upbringing with her contemporary world. Considered a master contemporary fine artist, her prints and monotypes feature stylized figures and abstract landscapes. Her commercial art extends from tee-shirt design, to the logo for the East Central University (Ada, Oklahoma) Hayes Native American Studies Center, to the cover design for the National Congress of American Indians History book.

Her work has been featured in exhibits at galleries throughout Indian country: in Arizona, the Heard Museum in Phoenix; in New Mexico, the Institute of American Indian Arts Museum and the Wheelwright Museum both in Santa Fe; in Oklahoma, Tsa-la-Gi Cherokee Center Museum, Tahlequah and Gilcrease Museum and Philbrook Museum of Art in Tulsa; in South Dakota, the Red Cloud Indian Art Museum in Pine Ridge; and in Washington state, the Daybreak Star Museum in Seattle. She has also had work featured at the Smithsonian Museum of the American Indian in Washington, D.C.

Gray owned and operated art galleries in Santa Fe, New Mexico; Tulsa, Oklahoma; and most recently in Pawhuska, Oklahoma. As well her work being part of numerous private collections and galleries throughout the world, some of her art is owned by the Sultan of Brunei and two royal princes of Jordan—his Royal Highness Prince Tlal bin Mohammed and His Royal Highness Prince Ghazi bin Mohammed.

== Activism ==
One of the things that Gray fought for at Wounded Knee was the deplorable lack of educational opportunities for native children. Throughout her long career, she remained involved in projects that benefited education, like the Council of Energy Resource Tribes education programs, the Trail of Painted Ponies project, and the creation of the Hayes Native American Studies Center.

Gray also has participated in projects exposing FBI surveillance of Native American activists and the impact this has on privacy both individually and collectively.

== Honors and awards ==
Gray has won numerous awards for her artwork throughout Indian Country and served a four-year appointment by the Secretary of the Interior as a commissioner on the Indian Arts and Crafts Board in Washington D.C.

- 1988 – Outstanding Young Women of America
- 1989 – Featured artist Stables Art Center, Taos, NM
- Featured artist Gallup All Indian Inter-Tribal Indian Ceremonial
- Featured artist Eight Northern Indian Pueblos Arts & Crafts Show, New Mexico
- 1st place, textiles: National American Cultural Arts Festival
- 1990 – 1st place graphics: Red Earth Fine Arts Competition
- 1990 – Featured artist: Heard Indian Art Museum, Phoenix, AZ
- 1991 – Southwest American Indian Art Association (SAIAA) Fellowship winner: 70th Annual Santa Fe Indian Market
- 1992 – 2nd place ("Clan Seeker"): National Museum of the American Indian/Smithsonian Institutions.
- 1993 – Featured artist for the Seventh Annual Tulsa Indian Arts Festival
