= Alexandra Backford =

Alaska Native painter (1942–2010)

- Born: 1942; Alaska
- Died: 2010 (aged 67–68)
- Citizenship: American, Unangan (Aleut)
- Education: Institute of American Indian Arts
- Occupations: painter, printmaker

"Fisherman," woodblock print from the Smithsonian collection

Alexandra Backford (1942–2010) was an Aleut-American painter from Alaska. She studied at the Institute of American Indian Arts in Santa Fe, New Mexico, in the 1960s and has exhibited her work across the country. Some of her works are in the permanent collection of institutions including the Smithsonian National Museum of the American Indian.

Backford was the daughter of Constantine and Anna Backford of Nushakag, Clark's Point, Alaska. She said of her time at the institute, "I like it here." Some of her work features local landscapes and people at work.
