= Melanie Yazzie =

Navajo artist

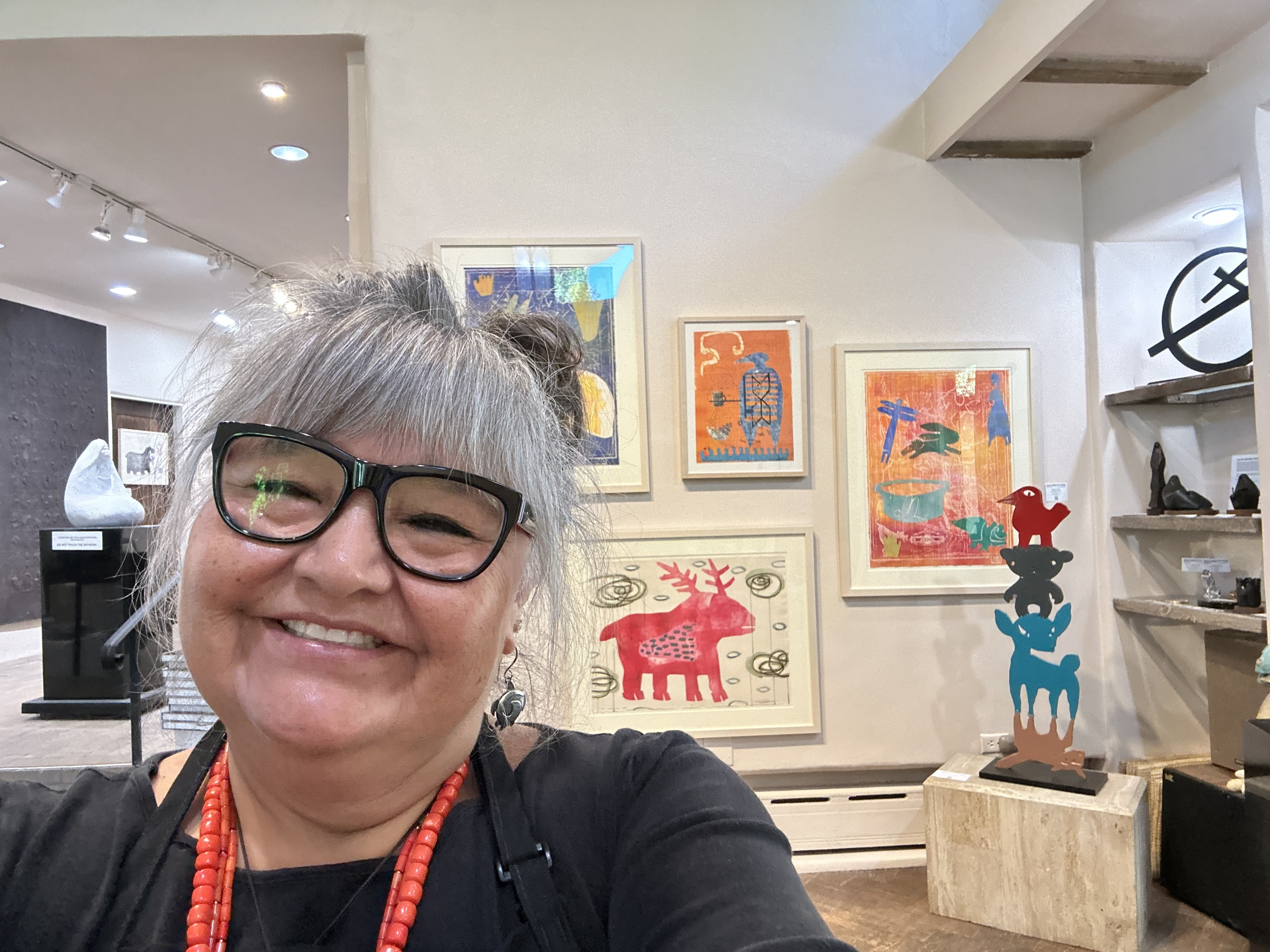
- Born: Melanie A.Yazzie; 1966 (age 59–60); Ganado, Arizona, United States
- Education: Westtown School; Arizona State University (BA), University of Colorado at Boulder (MFA)
- Occupations: Sculptor, printmaker, photographer, and painter
- Website: glenngreengalleries.com/melanie-yazzie

Melanie A. Yazzie (born 1966) is a Navajo sculptor, painter, printmaker, and professor. She teaches at the University of Colorado at Boulder.

*There are many people with the name Melanie Yazzie including college professors. This page is about the artist and professor based in Colorado.

== Early life and education ==
Yazzie was born in 1966 in Ganado, Arizona, United States. She is Navajo of the Áshįįhí (Salt Water Clan), born for Tó Dichʼíinii (Bitter Water Clan). She grew up on the Navajo Nation.

Yazzie first studied art at the Westtown School in Pennsylvania. She earned a BA degree in studio art with a minor in Spanish from Arizona State University in 1990 and an MFA in printmaking from the University of Colorado at Boulder in 1993.

== Artwork ==
Yazzie works in a wide range of media that include printmaking, painting, sculpting, and ceramics, as well as installation art. Her art is accessible to the public on many levels, and the main focus is on connecting with people and educating them about the contemporary status of one Native American woman, and hoping that people can learn from her experience.

Her subject matter is significant because the serious undertones reference native post-colonial dilemmas. Yazzie's work focuses primarily on themes of Native people. Her work often brings images of women from many Indigenous cultures to the forefront. Thus her work references matrilineal systems and points to the possibility of female leadership. There are many layers to the works and within the story layers, viewers discover that Indigenous history is varied and deep. Yazzie also collaborates with other Indigenous artists to increase further cognizance and create shared experiences through art practice about Indigenous people.

A recurring motif in some of Yazzie's work has been Blue Bird flour sacks, which provided clothing material to many Navajo children throughout the 20th century. The flour sacks are also known to be used for tablecloths, food protection, and curtains in hogan homes. The Blue Bird flour sacks are an essential icon from Yazzie's childhood. They serve as a connection to her grandparents and also a connection to memories of butchering sheep, a time-honored event with her family while growing up.

Yazzie is known for her multilayered monotypes that focus on storytelling and reflect her dreamtime friends and companions. The works are filled with colors and textures that reflect different world. The works are made with stencils and often she is printing with soy-based inks called Akua inks that are safe for the artist and the environment. The works most often are printed on Arches 88 due to the absorbing quality of that 100% rag paper. It is a fine art paper made in France and very soft to the touch. It is a paper designed originally for screen printing but is the perfect surface for many of the works Yazzie creates. The works often are monotypes as opposed to monoprints. These monotpes are a one-of-a-kind works and not made in multiples. The monotypes are often what she creates on travels to various printmaking studios worldwide in which she shares these techniques and sometimes collaborates with other Indigenous artists worldwide.

== Teaching ==
She is a professor and the head of printmaking at the University of Colorado at Boulder. She teaches printmaking courses and travels extensively to Indigenous communities within the United States and abroad. She can always be found through the University of Colorado Art and Art History Department.

In addition to teaching at the Institute of American Indian Arts, the College of Santa Fe, Boise State University, and the University of Arizona, Yazzie has taught at the Pont Aven School of Contemporary Art in France.

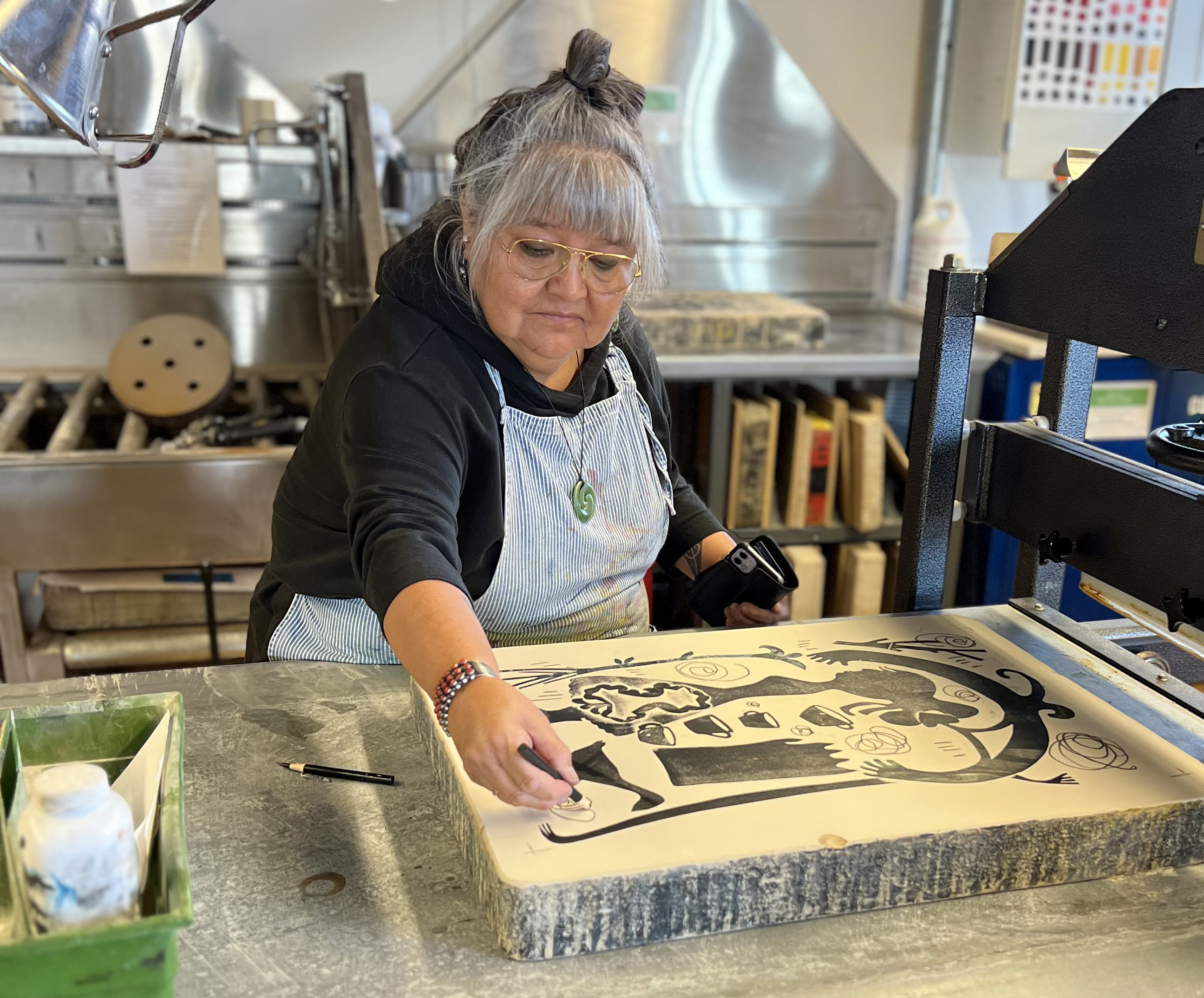

=== Printmaking ===
Yazzie has led more than 100 international print exchanges over a 20-year period. These exchanges include artists from Siberia, Japan, New Zealand, Australia, Canada, Mexico, and Germany. These international print exchanges examine many issues relevant our current day societies and the invited artists are asked to respond to the issues or themes in making their work for these exchanges. These projects are community-building events that help people connect over large distances and are often used as teaching tools in art studios across the globe.

Some of these print projects are held in the Artist Printmaker Research Collection at Texas Tech University in Lubbock, Texas. The collection is a resource for researching contemporary printmakers. Other projects can be seen by visiting the University of Colorado at Boulder Special Collections located in the university library.

In 2012, the Denver Art Museum welcomed Yazzie as artist-in-residence, making her the first in the Native Arts department.

=== Exhibitions ===
A selection of major exhibitions from the 1990s to the present include "Between Two Worlds" (2008) at Arizona State University, "Traveling" at the Heard West Museum (2006), "About Face: Self-Portraits by Native American, First Nations, and Inuit Artists" at the Wheelwright Museum (2005), "Making Connections" (2002) in Bulova, Russia, "Navajo in Gisborne" (1999) in Gisborne, New Zealand and "Watchful Eyes" (1994) at the Heard Museum.

In September 2013 she co-curated the exhibition "Heart Lines: Expressions of Native North American Art" in Colorado University Art Museum, partially based on her private collection and including her work "Pollen Girl".

In February 2014, Yazzie opened the largest retrospective of her work in 20 years at the University of New Mexico (UNM) Art Museum titled Geographies of Memory curated by Lisa Tamiris Becker, director of the UNM Art Museum. The exhibit ran through May 2014. A catalogue accompanied the exhibition.

Yazzie's solo show Histories Beyond Homeland opened on October 8, 2015, at the University of Denver Museum of Anthropology. This exhibition consists of Yazzie's depiction of landscape drawings, drawn from the perspective of someone looking down at the earth. Works displayed use gouache, an opaque version of watercolor paint, and handmade paper, in these aerial view interpretations.

The Wheelwright Museum of the American Indian in Santa Fe, New Mexico opened a solo show entitled "Memory Weaving: Works by Melanie Yazzie" in May 2018. The exhibit continued through October 6, 2018.

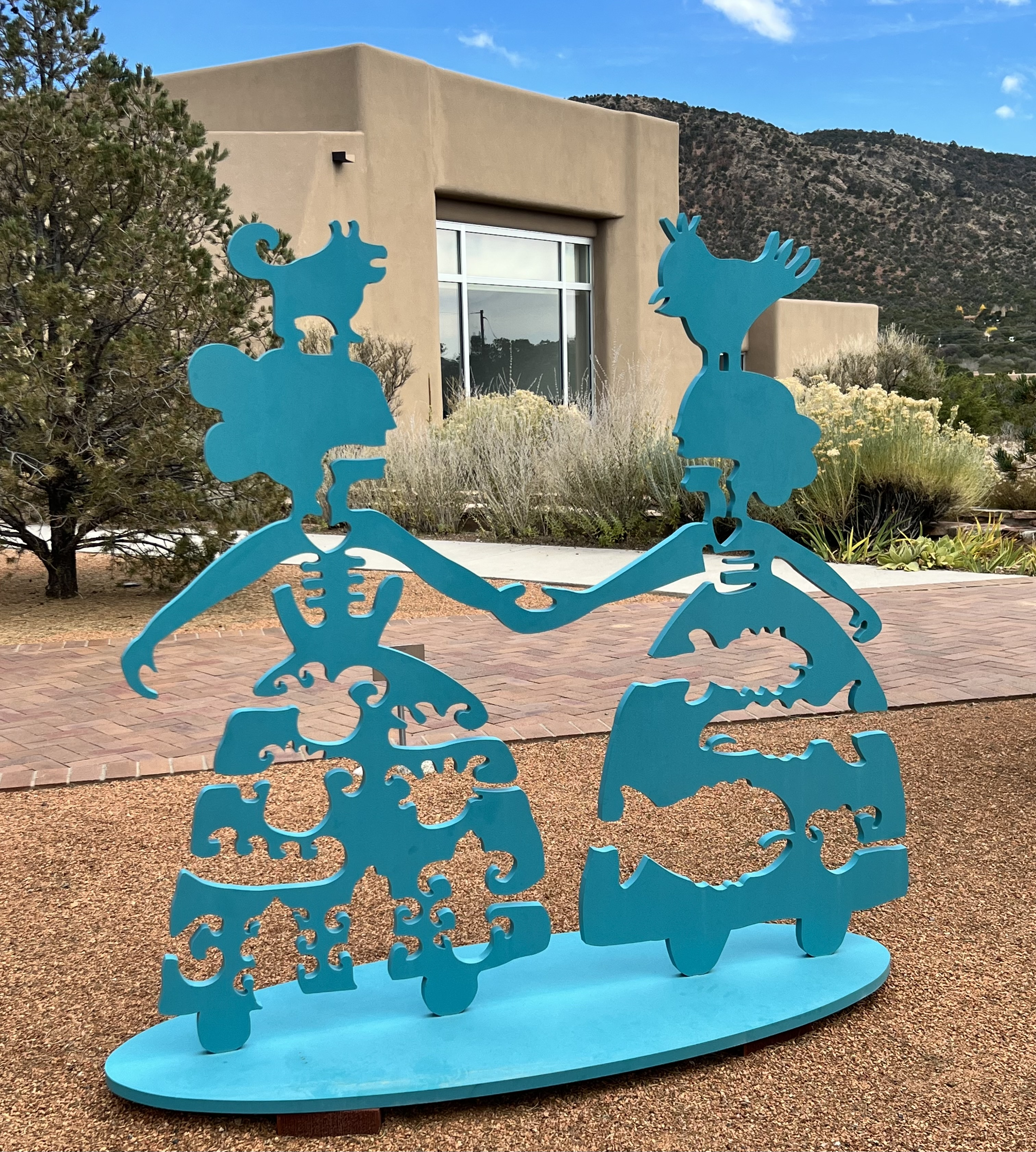
Melanie Yazzie aluminum sculpture "Making New Friends" at the Wheelwright Museum, Santa Fe, New Mexico (photo: Glenn Green Galleries)

== Public collections ==
Yazzie's artwork is in numerous museums' collections. These include the New Mexico Museum of Art; Rhode Island School of Design, Print Collection; the IAIA Museum of Contemporary Native Art; the Kennedy Museum of Art, Art Collection, Ohio University, Athens, Ohio; Rhodes University, Print Collection, Grahamstown, South Africa; City of Boulder, Colorado; Boulder Arts + Culture; New Mexico Arts in Public Places; Art in Embassies: US Department of State; and Smithsonian Institution, National Museum of the American Indian Washington, DC, University of Denver, CO, New Mexico Museum of Art, Santa Fe, NM, the Wheelwright Museum of the American Indian, Santa Fe, NM, Institute of American Indian Arts, Santa Fe, NM.

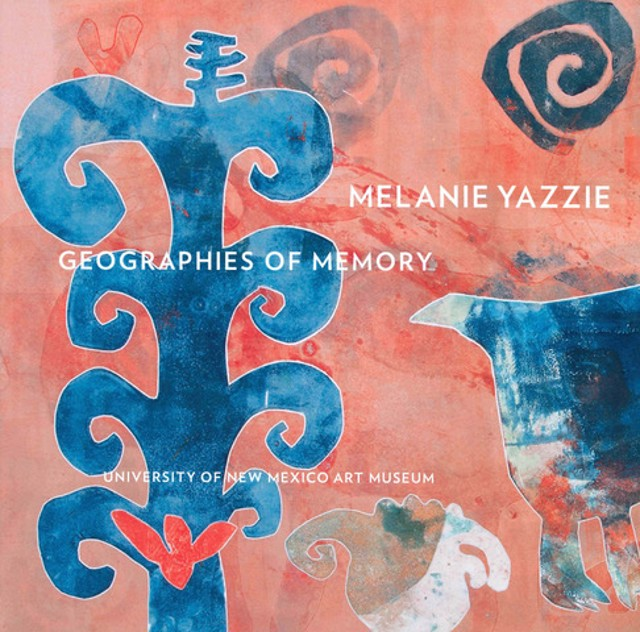

== Bibliography ==
Yazzie is included in Zena Pearlstone's About Face: Self-Portraits by Native American, First Nations, and Inuit Artists); Lucy Lippard's The Lure of the Local: Sense of Place in a Multicentered Society; W. Jackson Rushing III's Native American Art in the Twentieth Century; Native Art Now! Developments in Contemporary Native American Art Since 1992, edited by Veronica Passalacqua and Kate Morris, compiled by James H. Nottage; The Carved Line:Block Printing in New Mexico by Josie Lopez; Geographies of Memory: Melanie Yazzie, by Lisa Tamiris Becker, Lucy Lippard, UNM Art Museum, 2014.
