= Doane Tulugaq Avery =

American filmmaker of Inupiaq descent

- Born: 1979 (age 46–47); Pacific Northwest
- Education: BA, Institute of American Indian Arts; MFA, California Institute of the Arts
- Style: narrative

Doane Tulugaq Avery (born 1979) is a Los Angeles-based Iñupiaq filmmaker. Her films address the "cultural, social and familial narratives with interest in how the feminine, queer and Indigenous representations expand dialogue in social and political conversation."

== Early life and education ==
Avery grew up in the Pacific Northwest. She received a Bachelor of Arts degree in museum studies from the Institute of American Indian Arts in 2009. She later went on to complete her graduate MFA work in 2016 at the California Institute of the Arts where she created as her thesis film Polar Sun, combining traditional Iñupiaq tales about the northern lights with family dramas shot in a muted color palette. The film screened in several venues including at the Winnipeg Film Group. Following her education, she worked in the non-profit sector, including at the Santa Fe Art Institute.

== Work ==
Avery's 2018 film Gently, Jennifer, is a coming-of-age story of two girls in the 1980s; she received the Jane Glassco Award for Emerging Talent from the C.J. Foundation and ImagineNative to produce the film. The stories she develops in her films are centered on feminine, queer and Indigenous character-driven narratives. Her work has screened internationally at numerous film festivals, including the Seattle Queer Film Festival, the Oaxaca Film Festival (Mexico), Outfest, Māoriland Film Festival (New Zealand), among others. Her film, Mama Dragon explores the story of a queer 40-year old ex-Mormon. Avery has said of her work, "I find that if I allow myself to explore the in-between spaces, it’s a place of natural curiosity and empathy."

== Personal life ==
Avery married her wife Lorie Wallick on August 31, 2019.

== Awards and honors ==
In 2016 Avery won the Jane Glassco Award from ImagineNative and the Emerging Filmmaker Award from the L.A. SkinsFest. She received a fellowship from the Sundance Institute in conjunction with the IAIA Native Writers Workshop. Later, in 2021, she received a fellowship from the Sundance Institute's Native Directors Lab for her work on Mama Dragon. She was also named a fellow by the Barcid Foundation's Native American TV Writers Lab, among other honors. She received a fellowship in 2021 from the Native American Showrunner Program, which is sponsored by WarnerMedia, the Cherokee Film Office, Bad Robot, and Comcast NBC Universal.
