= Brian Yazzie =

Navajo chef

Brian Yazzie, known as Yazzie the Chef is a Navajo chef. He celebrates and promotes Indigenous American foods.

He was born into the Navajo Nation in Dennehotso, Arizona. He moved to Minnesota in 2013.

In 2017, he became the chef de cuisine at Sean Sherman's the Sioux Chef.

In 2018, Yazzie and his wife Danielle Yazzie-Polk founded Intertribal Foodways, a catering company in St. Paul. The company prepares Indigenous meals and leads demonstrations for Native American communities. In 2020, he started working at Gatherings Cafe, but it shut down due to the coronavirus pandemic.

During the COVID-19 pandemic, he partnered with the Minneapolis American Indian Center to prepare hundreds of meals for elderly people and delivering them for free.

Yazzie is a member of I-Collective, a group of indigenous chefs, farmers, foragers, hunters, and food historians. He is also involved with Slow Food and was a delegate to Terra Madre Salone del Gusto in Turin, Italy and to Indigenous Terra Madre in Japan.

PBS's Independent Lens made an episode of their series of shorts "alter-NATIVE: Kitchen" about Yazzie.
