= Debra Yepa-Pappan =

Debra Yepa-Pappan is an artist in digital multimedia, focusing heavily on photography and digital collaging. Most influenced by her multicultural upbringing, with a South Korean mother and a Native American father, her work reflects the struggle of identity, modernity, and stereotypes revolving around Native American culture.

== Life ==
Yepa-Pappan was born in South Korea while her father was stationed in the country with the U.S. Army. She grew up in Chicago where her family immigrated when she was very young. She attended the Institute of American Indian Arts in Santa Fe with a degree in 2- and 3-dimensional art in 1992, before she proceeded to Columbia College Chicago. She met her husband, Chris Pappan, while attending IAIA. As of 2017, they live in Chicago with their daughter.

== Artistry ==
Drawing from traditional Jemez Pueblo and Korean imagery, Chicago's modern urbanism and science fiction, most of Yepa-Pappan's work aims to challenge the viewer with their concept of reality. She attempts to confront stereotypes and involves the coming generations to be culturally engaged. She takes photographs and digital images and layers and distorts them to create complex images to make bold statements. Yepa-Pappan uses the contrasts of her differing cultural lives to talk about living between two worlds and tends to pose questions to the viewer versus answering them.

== Major works ==
- I Is for Indians series pieces: Live Long and Prosper (Spock Was a Half Breed), 2008 and remastered in 2013 and The Doctor's Companion, 2014
- First People, Second City, exhibition at Bristol, England's Rainmaker and a discussion panel and lecture presentations at The Royal West of England Academy in 2014
- War Baby/Love Child: Mixed Race Asian American Art, book and group exhibition at DePaul University Art Museum in Chicago and Wing Luke Museum in Seattle, 2013
- Dual(ing) Identities, solo exhibition at the IAIA Museum of Contemporary Native Arts in Santa Fe, 2012
- Program Coordinator for Title VII Indian Education program at Chicago Public Schools
