= Esther Belin =

Diné multimedia artist and writer

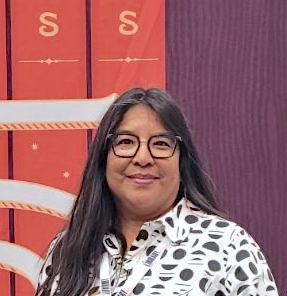
- Belin at the 2025 National Book Festival in Washington D.C.
- Education: University of California, Berkeley (1991); Institute of American Indian Arts; Antioch University
- Occupation: Author
- Writing career
- Notable works: From the Belly of My Beauty, "Of Cartography: Poems (Sun Tracks)"
- Notable awards: American Book Award from the Before Columbus Foundation (2000)
- Movement: Works based upon Navajo philosophy of Saah Naagháí Bik’eh Hózho

Esther Belin is a poet and artist from the Navajo Nation (Diné). Her single-volume poetry book From the Belly of My Beauty was published in1999 and won the American Book Award.

Recently, she co-editedThe Diné Reader: An Anthology of Navajo Literature that was published in 2021 and on the Lists of Best Books, 2010-2023 of the American Indians in Children's Literature (AICL).

Belin received title of the inaugural poet laureate of Durango, Colorado (2024–2026) and a 2025 Academy of American Poets Laureate Fellow.

== Education ==
Belin attended the following institutions for higher education degrees: the University of California, Berkeley, the Institute of American Indian Arts in Santa Fe, New Mexico, and Antioch University.

== Published Works ==
=== Poetry ===
Belin's books

- From the Belly of My Beauty. Sun traks, v. 38. University of Arizona Press. 1999. ISBN 978-0-8165-1954-5., including "Bringing Hannah Home", "Blues-ing on the Brown Vibe", and "Night Travel"
- Of Cartography: Poems. University of Arizona Press. 2017. ISBN 978-0-8165-3602-3.

Within other books

- Allen, Paula Gunn, ed. (1996). Song of the Turtle: American Indian Literature 1974-1994. One World/Ballantine. ISBN 978-0-345-37525-4.
- Erdrich, Heid E.; Tohe, Laura, eds. (2002). Sister nations : Native American women writers on community. Minnesota Historical Society Press. ISBN 0-87351-428-9.
- Goeman, Mishuana (2013). "(Re)routing Native Mobility, Uprooting Settler Spaces in the Poetry of Esther Belin". Mark My Words: Native Women Mapping Our Nations. University of Minnesota Press. ISBN 978-0-8166-7791-7.
- Leong, Russell; University of California, Los Angeles Asian American Studies Center; Southern California Asian American Studies Central. Visual Communications (1991). Moving the image : independent Asian Pacific American media arts. Los Angeles: UCLA Asian American Studies Center and Visual Communications, Southern California Asian American Studies Central. pp. 245–247. ISBN 978-0-934052-13-9.
- Ortiz Simon J., ed. (1997). Speaking for the Generations: Native Writers on Writing. University of Arizona Press. ISBN 978-0-8165-1850-0.
- Walters, Anna Lee, ed. (1993). Neon Pow-Wow: New Native American Voices of the Southwest. Northland Publishing. ISBN 978-0-87358-562-0.

=== Editor ===
- The Diné Reader: An Anthology of Navajo Literature. University of Arizona Press. 2021. ISBN 978-0-8165-4099-0., with other editors

== See also ==
- List of writers from peoples indigenous to the Americas
