= Jackie Larson Bread =

Native American beadwork artist

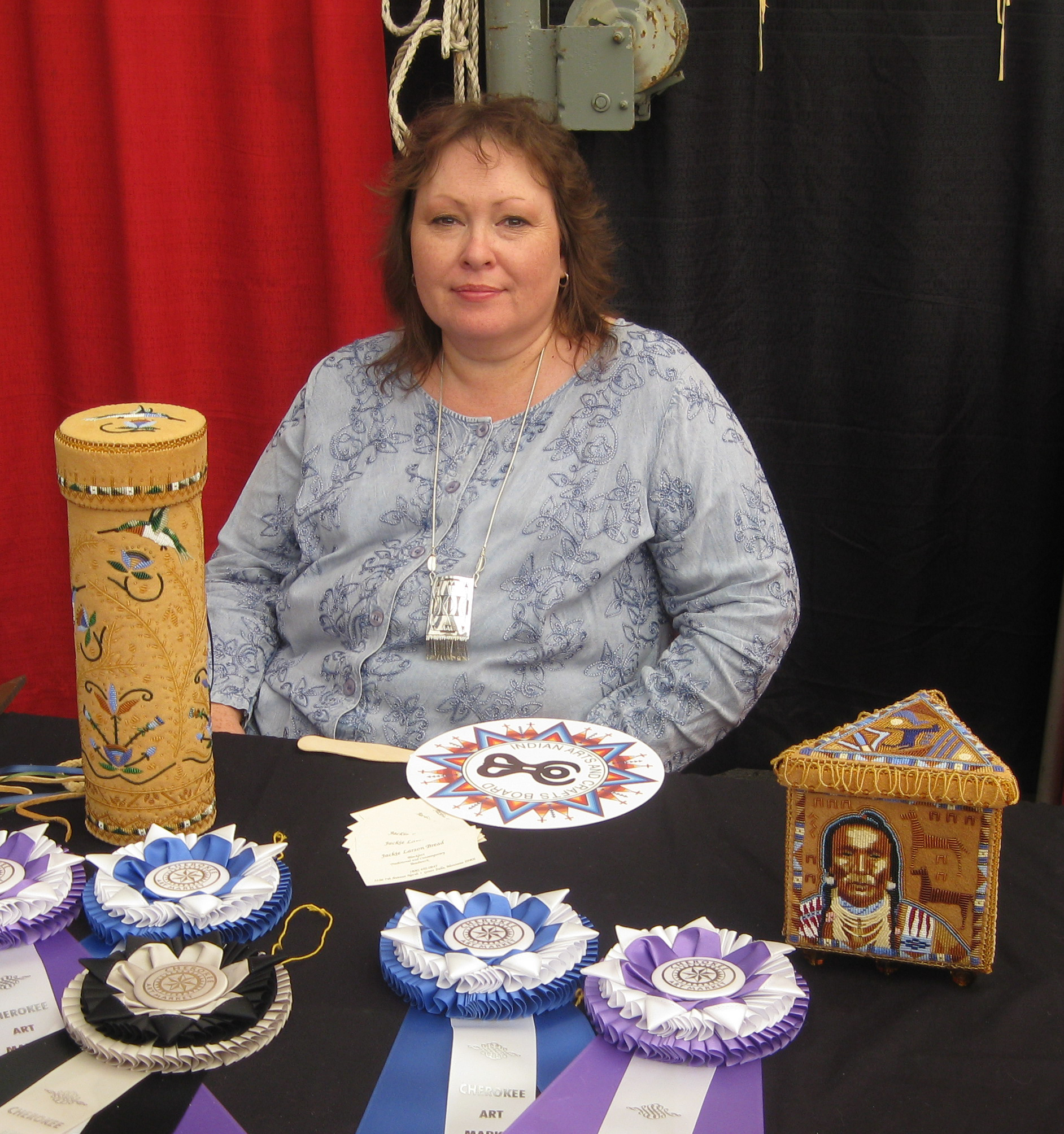
- Portrait of Jackie Larson Bread with award-winning artwork Keeper of Random Thoughts
- Citizenship: Blackfeet Tribe, United States
- Education: Institute of American Indian Arts
- Occupation: Beadwork artist

Jackie Larson Bread is a Native American beadwork artist from the Blackfeet Reservation in Browning, Montana. Her interest in bead work was sparked from looking at her late-grandmother's beaded pieces. In awe of these objects, Bread self-taught herself how to bead when she was younger and now, she has been beading for more than 20 years. Continuing through trial and error, Bread has received numerous awards for her beading.

== Education and training ==
In 1978, Bread enrolled at the Institute of American Indian Arts in Santa Fe, New Mexico. Upon completion, Bread earned associate degrees in two-dimensional art and museum studies. Afterwards, Bread continued her education at Santa Fe University of Art and Design. In 1986, Bread graduated with a Bachelor of Fine Arts in painting.

== Style and technique ==
When beading, Bread uses the applique stitch method which requires the use of two needles, as the first needle holds a row of beads and the second needle pins down one bead at a time to receive a precise placement. Bread uses a limited color palette that reflects Native American traditional beading colors, such as blue, black, red, yellow, and white. Growing up, Bread mainly used a limited number of colors because they were cheaper but as years progressed, Bread began to incorporate more diverse colors. Through illusionary beadwork, Larson mixes two different styles, traditional and contemporary imagery to create pictorial depth through different shades of beads. Within Bread's imagery beadwork, she integrates her culturally rich heritage and images of members of her community on bags, leather boxes, parasols, and other traditional items.

== Teaching ==
After graduating from the Institute of American Indian Art, Bread returned to her reservation in Browning, Montana. Applying her newly received degrees, Bread began working for the Museum of the Plains Indians. Bread took this job opportunity to further her education as she studied beadwork from previous artists. While working for museum, Bread also hosts workshops in the relatively close states to Montana, such as Idaho and California. Through her workshops, she teaches and shares her knowledge of traditional style beading. Working with the C.M. Russell Museum, Bread regularly teaches classes on beading.

== Artwork in collections ==
- In 2005, Museum of Arts and Design in Manhattan, New York, purchased and added Keeper of Random Thoughts to its collection
- Indian Corn II and Traveling Through Indian Country are in the collections of the National Museum of the American Indian in Washington, D.C
- The Institute of American Indian Arts in Santa Fe, New Mexico

== Awards and honors ==
- Summer of 2013, Bread competed in the Santa Fe Indian Market with approximately 12,000 other artists and her beaded artwork titled Memory Keeper was awarded "Best of Show".
- Summer of 2015, Bread collaborated with another Native American beadwork artist, Ken Williams in the Cherokee Art Market. Together, they won "Best of Division" in the beadwork and quillwork division with the artwork titled "Fit for An Arapaho/Blackfeet Dandy".
- Honored by Montana's Circle of American Masters that recognizes artists that use their artwork as a reflection of Montana's heritage.
