= Vernon Bigman =

Navajo artist

Vernon Bigman is a Navajo artist known for his abstract painting. Bigman's work is housed in the permanent collections at the National Museum of the American Indian and San Francisco Art Institute. As of 2019, Bigman is a library worker for the Pratt Institute.

== Education ==
Bigman was born in 1958 and completed his Bachelors in Fine Arts from the San Francisco Art Institute. He also completed a Masters in Fine Arts from the Pratt Institute in Brooklyn, New York and received schooling at the Institute of American Indian Arts.

== Select artworks ==
=== Dreamsnake series ===
The Dreamsnake series is a collection of five oil paintings on canvas:

- Dream Snakes and Holy Mountain
- Dream Snakes @ The Start of Ying and Yang
- Dream Snakes and The Dreaming Grass
- Dream Dance Kali
- Black Dreams

=== Other artwork ===
- Head of Wheel (Canvas, Oil Paint), made 1987, at National Museum of the American Indian

== Select exhibitions ==
- 2020 Revelation Gallery, New York, NY
- 2009 Nathan Cumming Foundation New York, NY
- 2008 New York Public Library, Tompkins Square Gallery, New York, NY
- 2005 Graduate studios, San Francisco Art Institute, San Francisco, CA
- 2005 New York Public Library Tompkins Square Gallery, New York, NY
- 1990 CommuniCations: Public Mirror: Artists Against Racial Prejudice, Museum of Modern Art, Manhattan, New York, NY

== Awards ==
Bigman was awarded an honorable mention in the 2007 SirsiDynix photography calendar competition.
