= Ralph Aragon =

Native American painter from New Mexico (born 1944)

- Born: 1944 (age 81–82); Algodones, New Mexico
- Citizenship: San Felipe Pueblo and American
- Education: Institute of American Indian Arts
- Style: ceramic painting
- Spouse: Joan Gachupin

Ralph Aragon (born 1944) is a San Felipe Pueblo painter and ceramic artist.

Aragon married into and lives at Zia Pueblo. He is particularly known for his painted coil-built pottery, with combines soft and bold colors paired with Pueblo customary pottery symbols and textured imagery from petroglyphs.

== Early life and education ==
Aragon was born at San Felipe Pueblo and later married into the Zia Pueblo. He was educated at the Institute of American Indian Arts in Santa Fe, New Mexico.

== Art career ==
Aragon has found success as an easel painter, a muralist, and later as a painter of pottery and gourds.

Aragon's work has been exhibited at the United States Department of the Interior's Second Annual Invitational Exhibition of American Indian Paintings (1965) and in the "Young American Indian Artists" exhibition (1965–66) at Riverside Museum, New York, New York.

Aragon painted a mural of two buckskin horses — one white and the other yellow — on the facade of the Nuestra Señora de la Asunción church in Zia Pueblo.
