= Mary Gay Osceola =

American painter

- Born: March 16, 1939 (age 86)
- Known for: painting

Seminole Mothers and Children shows Osceola's vivid, colorful painting style.

Mary Gay Osceola (born March 16, 1939) is an American Seminole painter and printmaker known for her vibrant paintings, a number of which depict the lives of the Florida Seminole people. Osceola was born in Florida and educated in Bureau of Indian Affairs boarding schools. She studied at the Santa Fe Indian School from 1960 to 1961, followed by time at the Institute of American Indian Arts until 1965. Her work has been exhibited across the United States and is in the permanent collection of museums including the Gilcrease Museum and the National Museum of the American Indian.
