= Karita Coffey =

Comanche ceramist

- Tsat-Tah Mo-oh Kahn
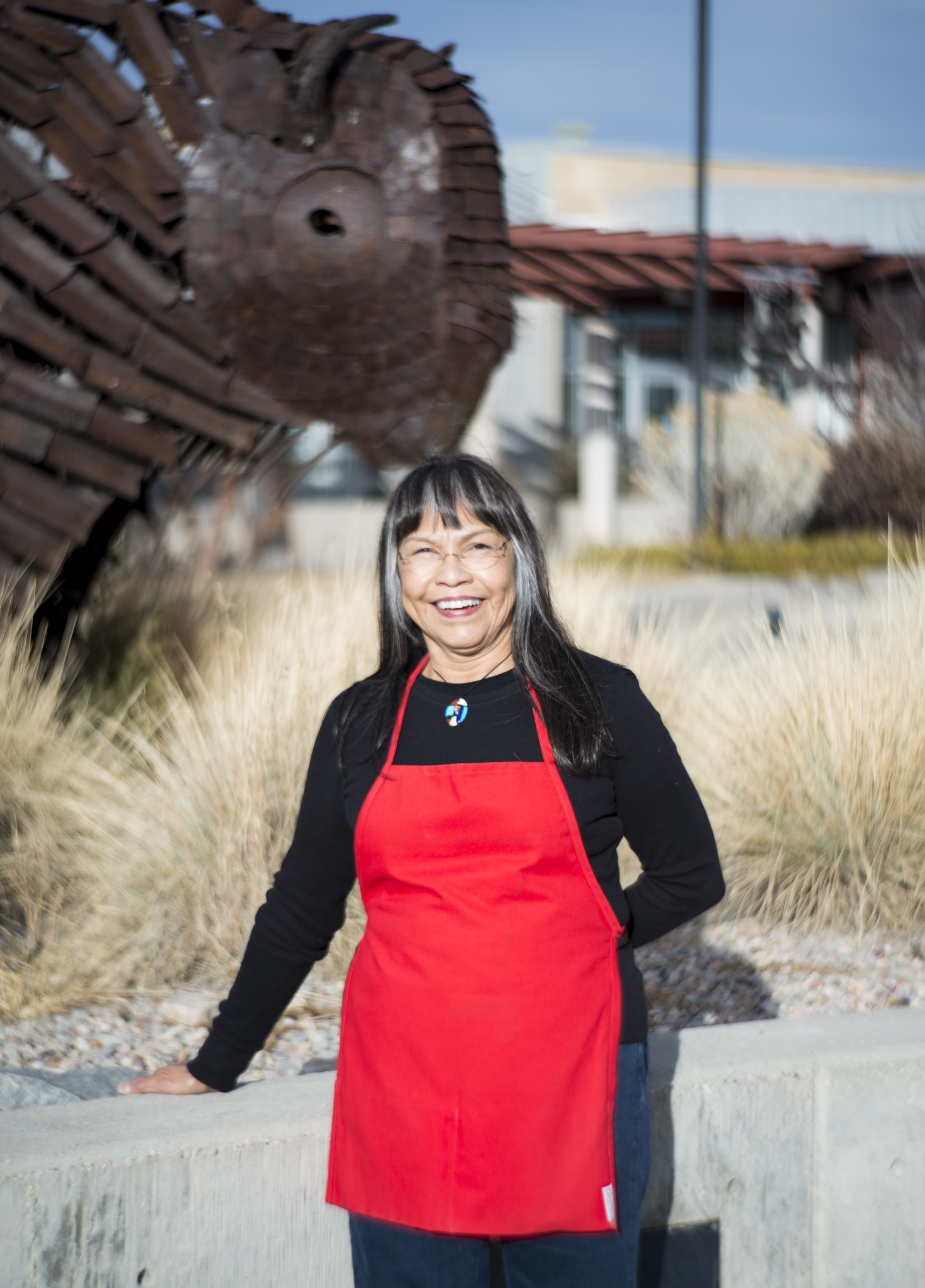
- Coffey in 2014
- Born: 1947 (age 78–79)
- Citizenship: Comanche Nation
- Education: Institute of American Indian Arts; University of Oklahoma

Karita Coffey (born 1947) is a Comanche ceramist, noted especially for producing ceramic versions of cultural items from her tribe, in addition to ceramic vessels. She also works in lost-wax cast metals.

== Background and education ==
Karita Coffey's Comanche name is Tsat-Tah Mo-oh Kahn, which translates to "Good-Handed." Coffey lived in Lawton, Oklahoma, before beginning her artistic training at the Institute of American Indian Arts when it was still a high school. She earned her bachelor's of fine arts and graduate degree in education from the University of Oklahoma.

== Career ==
Coffey completed teacher certification in art and served as artist-in-residence for the Oklahoma City public school system and taught pottery in Native American education programs in Oklahoma. Coffey later taught at IAIA for 25 years before retiring in 2015 to work on her sculpture.

Coffey's work is informed by aspects of African art and the art of the Australian Aborigines as well as by her own heritage.

== Exhibitions ==
- Indian Artists, 1977 at Via Gambaro Gallery, owned by Retha Walden Gambaro and Stephen A. Gambaro organized with the American Indian Society of Washington D.C, 1977
- National American Indian Women's Art Show at Via Gambaro Gallery, owned by Retha Walden Gambaro and Stephen A. Gambaro, 1980
- Contemporary Native American Art at the Gardiner Art Gallery at Oklahoma State University, 1983
- Women of Sweetgrass, Cedar, and Sage, Gallery of the American Indian Community House, travelling exhibition curated by Harmony Hammond and Jaune Quick-to-See Smith, 1985.
- Anticipating the Dawn: Contemporary Art by Native American Women, at the Gardiner Art Gallery at Oklahoma State University, curated by Anita Fields, 2000.

== Public collections ==
Her work is represented in the collection of the National Museum of the American Indian, which holds four works by Coffey. The works were created between 1970–71 and were initially purchased by the Indian Arts and Crafts Board, then transferred to the National Museum of the American Indian in 1985. Coffey's work is also in collections of the Fred Jones Jr. Museum of Art, the Millicent Rogers Museum, the Heard Museum, and the IAIA Museum of Contemporary Native Arts.
