= Marcus Amerman =

Native American artist from New Mexico (born 1959)

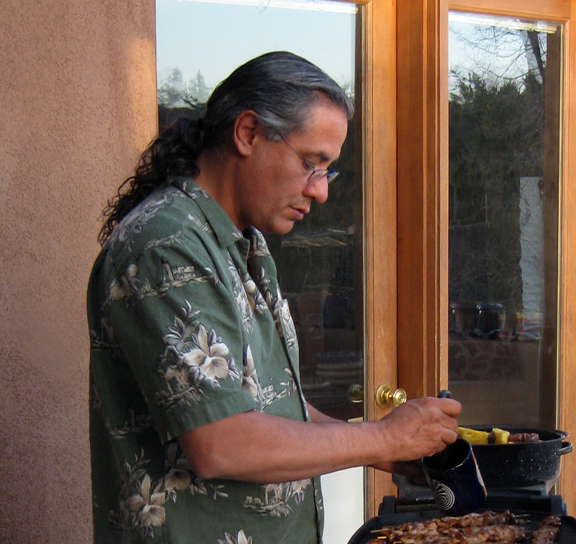
- Born: 1959 (age 66–67); Phoenix, Arizona, United States
- Citizenship: Choctaw Nation; United States
- Education: BFA Whitman College; College of Santa Fe; Institute of American Indian Arts; Anthropology Film Center
- Known for: Beadwork, glass art, painting, fashion design, performance
- Movement: Photorealism, Native pop
- Website: www.marcusamerman.com

Marcus Amerman (born 1959) is a Native American (Choctaw Nation) beadwork artist, glass artist, painter, fashion designer, and performance artist, living in Idaho. He is known for his highly realistic beadwork portraits.

== Background ==
Marcus Amerman was born in Phoenix, Arizona, in 1959 but grew up in the Pacific Northwest. At the age of 10, his aunt taught him the techniques for Native American beadwork. He earned his Bachelor of Fine Arts from Whitman College in Walla Walla, Washington. He also studied at the Institute of American Indian Arts and the Anthropology Film Center.

== Artwork ==
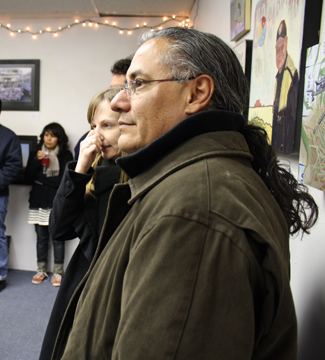
Amerman in 2009

His exploration of so many different genres of art overlap each other. For instance, Amerman's beadwork is integrated into clothing design. His outfits are featured in his performance art. His paintings and glasswork use a vivid palette that is found in his beadwork. He has even create giant beads out of glass.

Amerman's first foray into realism in beadwork was his 1993 Iron Horse Jacket, a studded leather jacket featuring a highly detailed and modeled image of Brooke Shields in beadwork. Later, he added portrait bracelets to his repertoire. He has portrayed many historical heroes in his beadwork, such as Lloyd Kiva New; as well a pop icons, such as Janet Jackson, and imagery inspired by comic superheroes is a current running throughout his work.

His paintings are expressive and often reflect his Choctaw roots, with Mississippian imagery. His work in glass also includes Mississippian ceramic designs, but more often reflects contemporary designs, such as globes of the earth.

== Selected public collections ==
Amerman's work is in such public collections as the George Gustav Heye Center, the National Museum of the American Indian, the American Museum of Natural History, the Heard Museum, the Portland Art Museum, the Wheelwright Museum in Santa Fe, the Sequoyah National Research Center in Little Rock, Arkansas, and the Museum of Arts and Design. He is the only artist to have his beadwork featured in Playboy magazine.

== Honors and awards ==
In 2008, Amerman was a Hauberg Fellow at the Pilchuck Glass School and artist-of-residence there in 2008. In 2014 he was awarded a USA Fellow, an award supported by the Rasmuson Foundation. He and Tlingit artist Preston Singletary both taught at the school in 2006 as part of Iconoglass.

== Personal life ==
Amerman's brother, Roger Amerman, is also an award-winning beadworker, inspired by Southeastern Woodland designs. Their first cousin, Linda Lomahaftewa is renowned for her printmaking and painting, as was her brother and Amerman's cousin, the late Dan Lomahaftewa. Amerman lives on the Nez Perce Indian Reservation in Kooshia, Idaho, with his elderly parents.

== Quote ==
Traditionally, Indians embraced new materials with which to create and new ideas to express.
