= James Thomas Stevens =

American poet and academic (born 1966)

James Thomas Stevens (born 1966) is an American poet and academic. He is a member of the Akwesasne Mohawk Nation and currently teaches at the Institute of American Indian Arts in Santa Fe, New Mexico.

== Background ==
James Thomas Stevens was born in Niagara Falls, New York, and his Mohawk name is Aronhió:ta's. His father was a Welsh-American and his mother is Mohawk.

== Education ==
In 1993 Stevens earned a Master of Fine Arts (MFA) in writing from Brown University Graduate Writing Program, where he had a full fellowship. He earned Associate of Fine Arts degree in creating writing from the Institute of American Indian Arts, where he received the Gerald Red Elk Scholarship in 1990, allowing him to attend the Naropa Institute Summer Writing Program. Stevens briefly attended the School of Visual Arts and Brooklyn College in New York.

== Academic and writing career ==
Stevens was an associate professor in the English Department of SUNY Fredonia and the director of American Indian Studies. He has also been an Instructor of Poetry at Brown University and taught at Haskell Indian Nations University.

He is an author of numerous volumes of poetry. An international poet with professional invitations to France, Turkey, and China, Stevens spoke at the United Nations Permanent Forum on Indigenous Issues in 2006. He formerly taught at Haskell Indian Nations University. He is member of the Native community and his free-verse poetry explores the intersection of colonization, memory, and intimacy.

== Awards and nominations ==
- 1991 Institute of American Indian Arts Creative Writing Award
- 1993 Kim Ann Arstark Memorial Prize in Poetry
- 1993 Wittner-Bynner Foundation Poetry Grant
- 1994 City of Santa Fe Writer's Award
- 1996 Pushcart Prize Nomination
- 2000 Whiting Award
- 2003 Nominated for a Before Columbus/American Book Award
- 2005 Finalist for the National Poetry Series Award

== Published books ==
- Tokinish. First Intensity Press. 1994. ISBN 978-1-88063-106-5.
- Combing the Snakes from His Hair. Michigan State University Press. 2002. ISBN 978-0-87013-590-3.
- (dis)Orient. Palm Press. 2005. ISBN 978-0-97431-813-4.
- Bulle/Chimére. First Intensity Press. 2006. ISBN 978-1-88996-012-8.
- Mohawk/Samoa: Transmigrations. Subpress. 2006. ISBN 978-1-93006-830-8. (with Caroline Sinavaiana)
- The Mutual Life. Plan B Press. 2006.
- A Bridge Dead in the Water. Salt Publishing. 2007. ISBN 978-1-84471-270-0.
- Of Kingdoms & Kangaroo. First Intensity Press. 2008. ISBN 978-1-88996-019-7.
