= Jon Davis (poet) =

American poet

- Born: 1952 (age 73–74); New Haven, Connecticut, U.S.
- Education: University of Montana
- Writing career
- Genre: Poetry

Jon Davis (born 1952) is an American poet.

== Biography ==
Davis was born in New Haven, Connecticut, and received a B.A. in English and an M.F.A. in creative writing from the University of Montana, where he was editor of the literary journal CutBank. He has served as writing program coordinator for the Fine Arts Work Center in Provincetown, edited the literary journals Shankpainter and Countermeasures: A Magazine of Poetry & Ideas, and taught at the University of Montana, College of Santa Fe (now Santa Fe University of Art and Design), and Salisbury State University. From 1990, he was a professor at the Institute of American Indian Arts in Santa Fe, New Mexico and founding director of the low-residency Creative Writing MFA there until his retirement in 2018.

Jon Davis is the author of six chapbooks and at least seven full-length collections of poetry. The awards Davis has received include the Lannan Literary Award, two National Endowment for the Arts Fellowships, and the Lavan Younger Poets Award from the Academy of American Poets.

He wrote the screenplay for the short film The Burden Carriers, which was screened at ImagineNative Film Festival in Toronto and at the Santa Fe Film Festival, and for The Hand Drum, a National Geographic All Roads Festival selection.

== Works ==
- Above the Bejeweled City (Grid Books, 2021) ISBN 9781946830135
- An Amiable Reception for the Acrobat (Grid Books, 2019) ISBN 9781946830050
- Improbable Creatures (Grid Books, 2017) ISBN 9781946830005
- Preliminary Report (Copper Canyon Press, 2010)
- Local Color (Palanquin Press, 1995),
- Scrimmage of Appetite (Akron University Press, 1995) (translated into Spanish by Roberto Appratto),
- The Hawk. The Road. The Sunlight After Clouds (Owl Creek Press, 1995)
- Dangerous Amusements (Ontario Review Press, 1987)

== Critical assessment ==
Jon Davis received effusive praise from David Foster Wallace in an otherwise scathing criticism of prose poetry. Wallace wrote of Davis as "a poet whom this reviewer'd never heard of before but whose pieces in this anthology are so off-the-charts terrific that the reviewer has actually gone out and bought the one Jon Davis book mentioned in his bio-note and may very well decide to try to advertise it in this magazine, at reviewer's own expense if necessary—that's how good this guy is."
