= Minneapolis American Indian Center =

American non-profit cultural organization

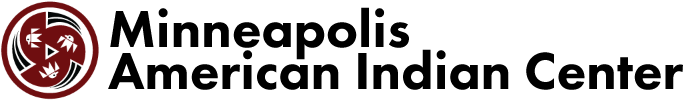
- Founded: 1975
- Type: Non-profit cultural organization
- Location: 530 E Franklin Ave, Minneapolis, Minnesota 55404, United States
- Coordinates: 44.963501022700186°N 93.25216332537359°W
- Region served: Twin Cities
- Services: Social services, education, cultural programming
- Key people: Mary LaGarde, Executive director
- Website: maicnet.org

The Minneapolis American Indian Center (MAIC) is a community center located in Minneapolis, Minnesota that serves the American Indian population in the Twin Cities area. The MAIC offers a wide range of programs and services focused on education, health, employment, social support, and cultural preservation.

== History ==
Originally established in 1975 as one of the first American Indian Centers in the country, the center was created by community members in response to the needs of the growing American Indian population living in the Minneapolis-St. Paul metropolitan area. The area had a large, tribally diverse Native population that often lacked access to culturally relevant services and resources.

=== Renovation & expansion ===
In 2024, the center completed a major $32 million renovation and expansion project that took two years. This renovation aimed to modernize the facility and improve its ability to serve the community. The center's reopening was celebrated with a parade and ribbon-cutting ceremony attended by local officials and community members.

== Programs ==
The Minneapolis American Indian Center functions as a hub for Native cultural events and community gatherings. It offers programs for all ages, including family services, youth development through the Boys & Girls Club, language and cultural classes, workforce training, nutrition and fitness education, and elder support. Among its key features are free Dakota and Ojibwe language classes and the continuation of traditional cultural celebrations, such as powwows. The center also houses a café serving meals made from Indigenous ingredients and hosts an art gallery and craft shop that showcase local Native artists. The center attracts over 25,000 visitors annually, making it a focal point for urban Native life in Minneapolis.
