= Jolene Yazzie =

Navajo graphic designer (born 1978)

Jolene Nenibah Yazzie
- Born: 1978 (age 47–48); Lupton, Arizona
- Education: Collins College, Institute of American Indian Arts
- Known for: Graphic Design, Comic Art

Jolene Nenibah Yazzie is an American graphic designer, specializing in comic art. Her artwork predominantly features women as Native American warriors, and she utilizes bright colors and contrast in her works.

== Early life ==
Yazzie was born and raised in Lupton, Arizona. She went on to earn her B.A. in graphic design from Collins College. Afterwards, she attended the Institute of American Indian Arts in Santa Fe, New Mexico. When Yazzie was a young child, she was introduced to art at an early age by her brother. Her mother was an important figure in her life growing up, and she inspired Yazzie in her artworks. As a child, she had trouble finding women superheroes in the comics that she liked to read, aside from Wonder Woman.

== Artistic influence ==
Navajo art and the art of storytelling is a major foundation in Yazzie's works. Because of the similarities of telling a narrative story in both comics and traditional Navajo art, the ability to combine the two is possible; according to Yazzie, many of the Navajo creation stories are similar to superhero stories in our current pop culture.

Her mother and sister were also important figures in Yazzie's works. Yazzie's sister had suffered sexual abuse in the past, and everyone in her family had decided to cover up the incident. Her mother had also worked in a battered women's shelter, and both of these experiences had a profound impact on Yazzie's outlook on women in her art. The women in her artwork are meant to reflect her mother and the other strong women figures in her life. Yazzie wanted to create strong and powerful female figure that would be the type that someone could look at and look up to, along with helping inspire their own inner strength.

== Work ==
She experiments with many different mediums in her work, but uses Adobe Photoshop and Adobe Flash to create her artworks. She also transfers her designs onto skateboards, and attempts to create her work unique from other graphic design artists. The bright contrast and colors in her work represent the power that she wants to show the women in her works to have, along with showing them as strong warriors.

== Exhibitions ==
The largest exhibition that her artwork was featured in, Comic Art Indigene, was displayed in the National Museum of the American Indian in Washington D.C. Yazzie's work was used for much of the publicity materials for the show.
