= Kevin Red Star =

Kevin Red Star (born 1943) is a Native American painter from Montana. He is a member of the Crow Tribe of Montana.

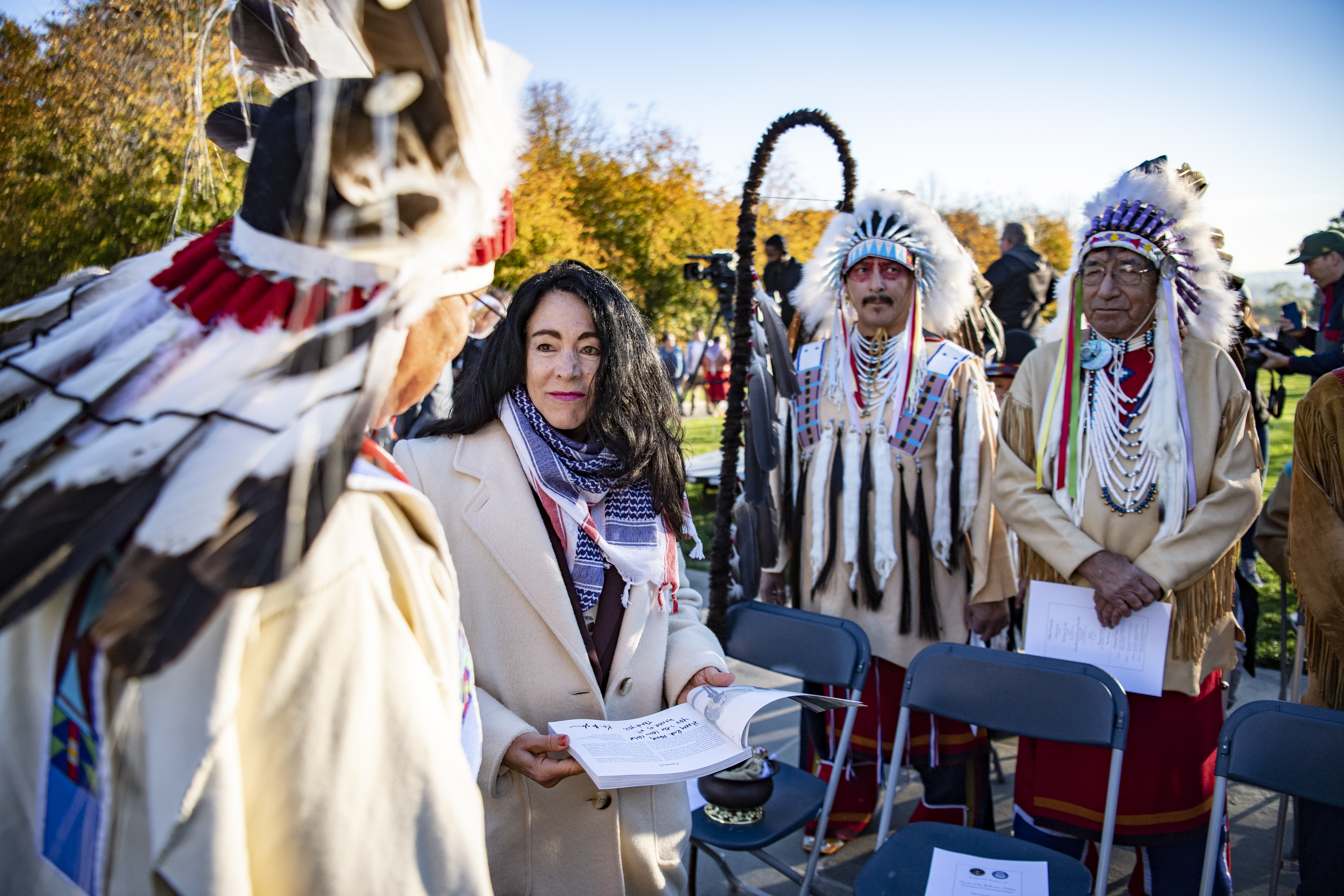
Crow Nation members at the Opening Ceremony for the Tomb of the Unknown Soldier Centennial Commemoration at Arlington National Cemetery on November 9, 2021

== Background ==
Kevin Red Star was born on the Crow Indian Reservation in Lodge Grass, Montana. He was raised in a family that values art and culture, where he developed an early love of drawing and music. This exposure and encouragement sustained him during his years in grade school during the time when Crow students were denied association with their language and cultural heritage.

== Education ==
Later, when he was one of 150 students chosen to attend the newly established Institute of American Indian Arts in Santa Fe, New Mexico, he was encouraged to explore his history and culture through modern art techniques.

Upon graduation, Red Star and several other Native students received scholarships to the San Francisco Art Institute. Here he was exposed to the avant-garde and political and social concerns of post-modern art.

He also attended Montana State University, Bozeman, Montana and Eastern Montana College (now MSU Billings), Billings, Montana.

== Art career ==
Working primarily in acrylic, ink, and collage, Red Star draws inspiration from Crow culture and history.

Via Gambaro Gallery, which was launched by Retha Walden Gambaro and Stephen Gambaro to spotlight contemporary Native American artists, included Red Star's work in its Indian Artists, 1977 exhibition as "representative of the new generation of Indian painters" alongside Native American artists of renown such as Allan Houser.

Pursuing a successful career spanning several decades, over 100 exhibitions have featured the celebrated artist's works on canvas and paper – some 40 of which have been solo exhibitions. Red Star's work was part of Stretching the Canvas: Eight Decades of Native Painting (2019–21), a survey at the National Museum of the American Indian George Gustav Heye Center in New York.

== Honors ==
In 1997, Kevin Red Star received an Honorary Doctorate Degree in Fine Art from the Rocky Mountain College in Billings, Montana.

== Collections ==
Red Star's works are included in several museum collections, including the Smithsonian Institution: National Museum of the American Indian; C.M. Russell Museum; Heard Museum; Denver Art Museum; Eiteljorg Museum; Southwest Museum; Whitney Museum of Western Art; Institute of American Indian Arts Museum; United States Department of State; and scores of others.
