= Institute of American Indian Arts =

Public tribal college in Santa Fe, New Mexico, US

Institute of American Indian Arts (IAIA)
- Type: Public tribal land-grant college
- Established: 1962
- Affiliations: AIHEC
- Endowment: $28.7 million (2025)
- President: Shelly C. Lowe
- Location: Santa Fe, New Mexico, United States; 35.587°N 106.010°W
- Colors: Silver & Turquoise
- Mascot: Thunderbird
- Website: www.iaia.edu
- Federal Building
- U.S. National Register of Historic Places
- NM State Register of Cultural Properties
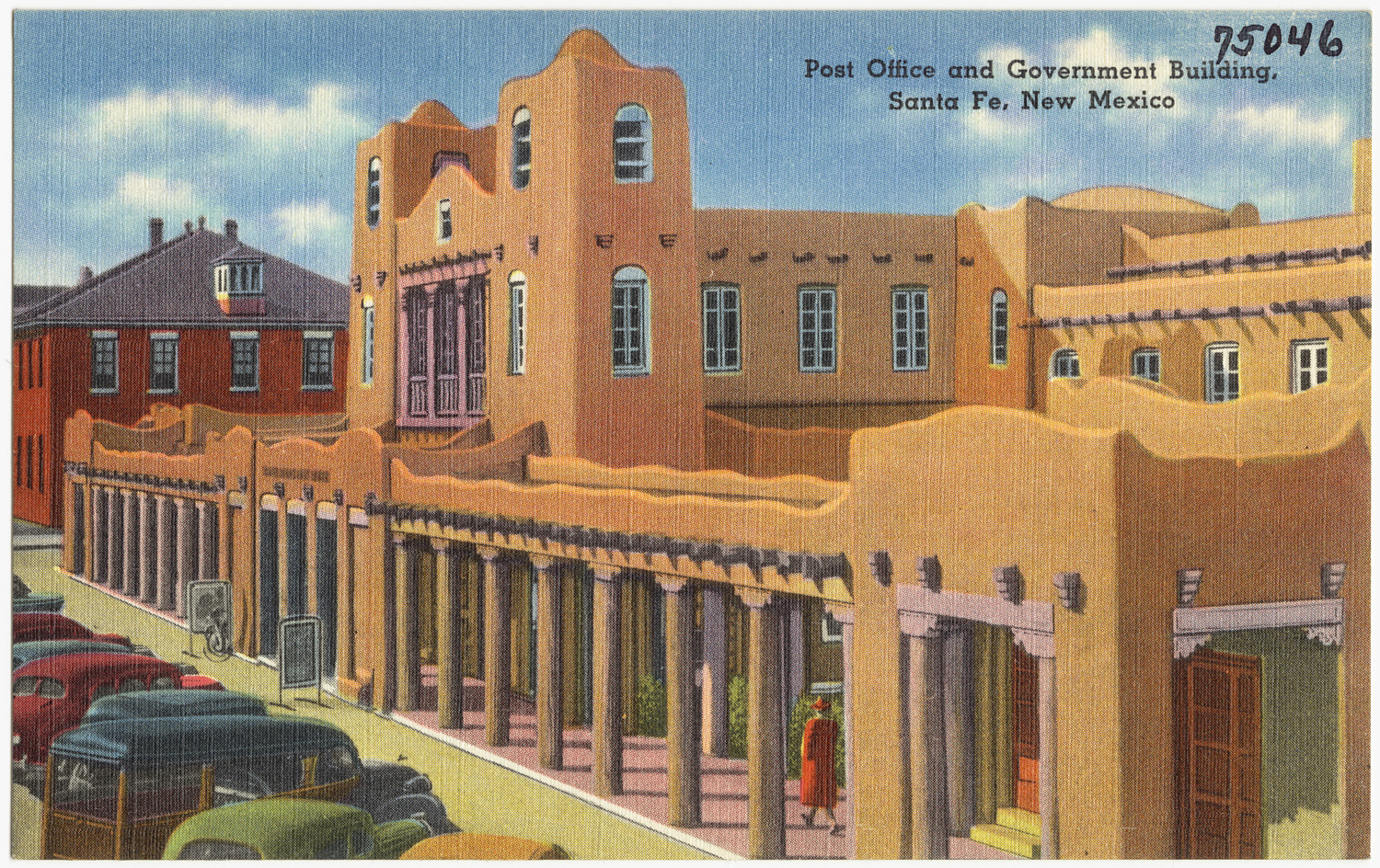
- 20th Century postcard depicting the Federal Building

- Location within New Mexico Location within the United States
- Location: 108 Cathedral Place at Palace St., Santa Fe, New Mexico
- Coordinates: 35°41′13″N 105°56′11″W
- Area: 1 acre (0.40 ha)
- Built: 1920
- Architectural style: Pueblo
- NRHP reference No.: 74001207
- NMSRCP No.: 874

Significant dates
- Added to NRHP: August 15, 1974
- Designated NMSRCP: June 4, 1982

The Institute of American Indian Arts (IAIA) is a public tribal land-grant college in Santa Fe, New Mexico, United States. The college focuses on Native American art. It operates the Museum of Contemporary Native Arts (MoCNA), which is housed in the historic Santa Fe Federal Building (the old Post Office), a landmark Pueblo Revival building listed on the National Register of Historic Places as Federal Building. The museum houses the National Collection of Contemporary Indian Art, with more than 7,000 items.

== History ==
The Institute of American Indian Arts was co-founded by Lloyd Kiva New (Cherokee, 1916–2002) and Dr. George Boyce in 1962 with funding from the Bureau of Indian Affairs. The school was founded upon the recommendation of the BIA Department of Education and the Indian Arts and Crafts Board. Three factors led to the school's founding: growing dissatisfaction with the academic program at the Santa Fe Indian School, the BIA's emerging interest in higher education, and the influence of the Southwest Indian Art Project and the Rockefeller Foundation.

IAIA began on the SFIS campus in October 1962. From 1962 to 1979, IAIA ran a high school program, and began offering college- and graduate-level art courses in 1975. In 1986, the Institute of American Indian and Alaska Native Culture and Arts Development was congressionally chartered as a nonprofit organization, similar to the structure of the Smithsonian Institution, which separated the school from the BIA. It was designated a land-grant college in 1994 alongside 31 other tribal colleges. In 2001, the school was accredited, including the accreditation of four year degrees. A two-year low-residency MFA in creative writing was accredited in 2013.

Today, IAIA sits on a 140-acre (57 ha) campus 12 miles (19 km) south of downtown Santa Fe and also operates the Museum of Contemporary Native Art, which is located in Santa Fe Plaza, as well as the Center for Lifelong Education.

== IAIA Museum of Contemporary Native Arts ==
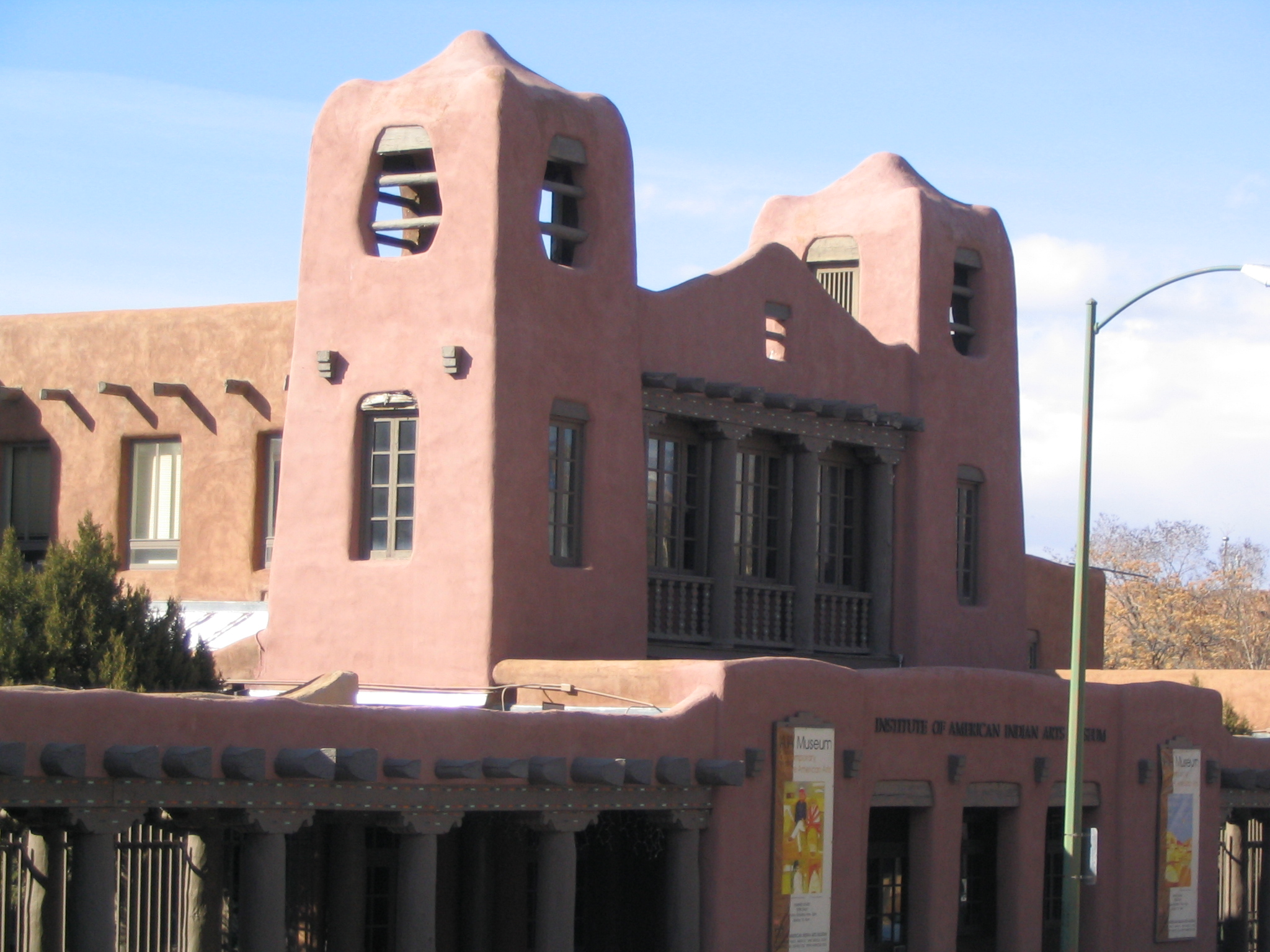
IAIA Museum of Contemporary Native Arts, Santa Fe, 2004

In 1991 the college founded the Institute of American Indian Arts Museum, now the IAIA Museum of Contemporary Native Arts (MoCNA), in downtown Santa Fe, with a focus on contemporary intertribal Native American art, the MoCNA is housed in the historic Santa Fe Federal Building (the old Post Office), a landmark Pueblo Revival building listed on the National Register of Historic Places. The museum also features the Allan Houser Sculpture Garden.

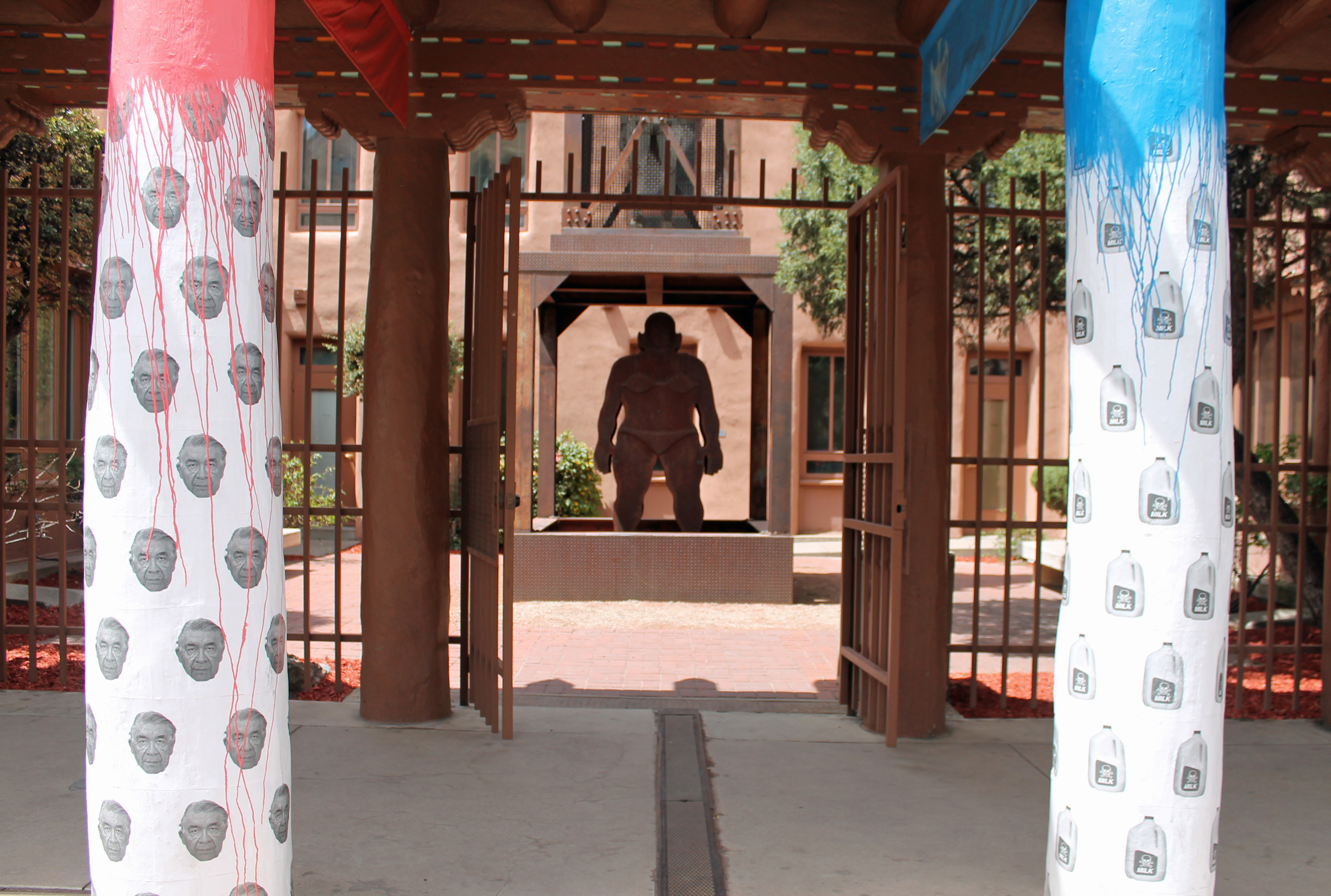
IAIA MoCNA columns flanking a sculpture by Bob Haozous (Chiricahua Apache)

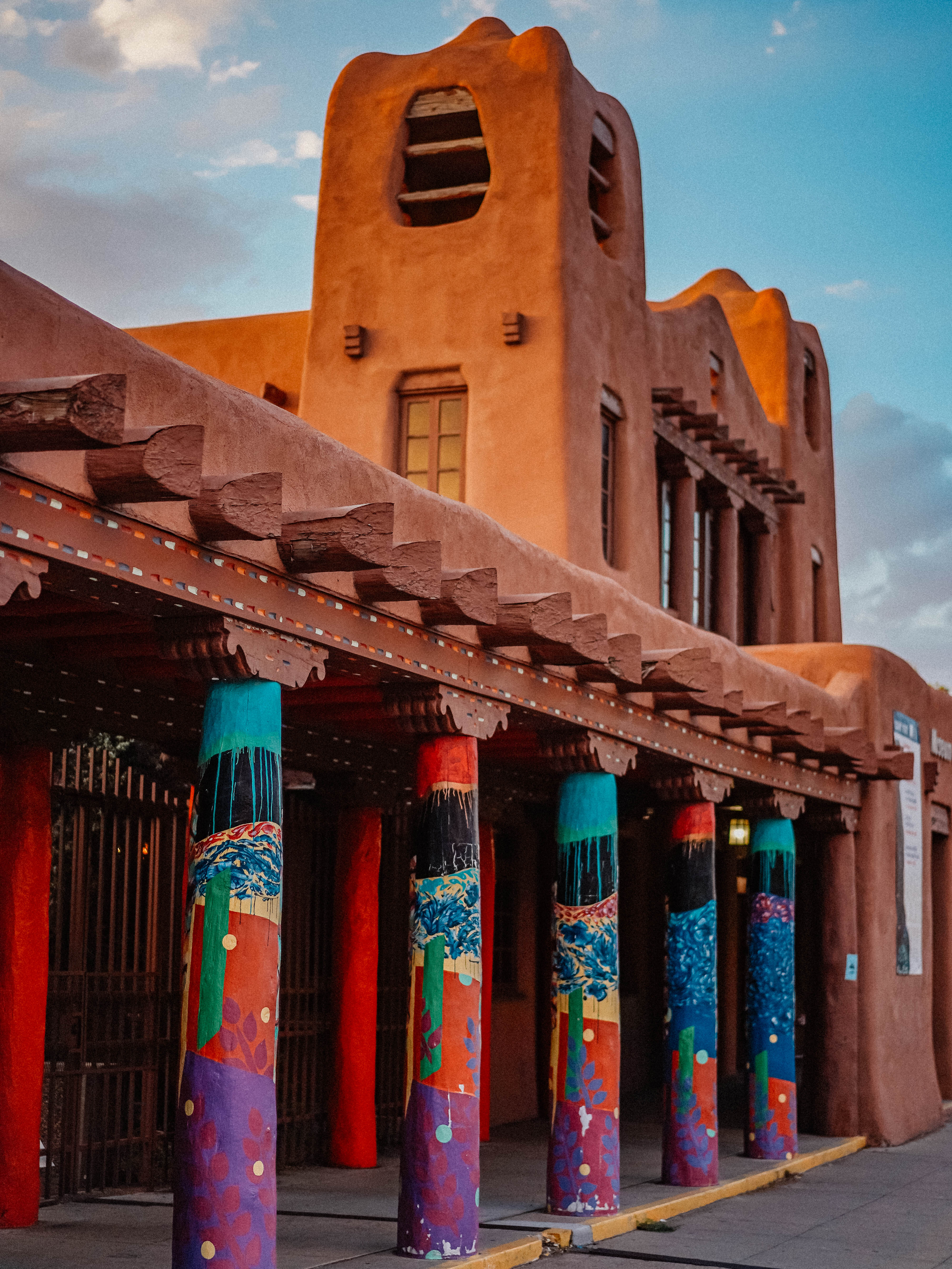
The main entrance of MoCNA

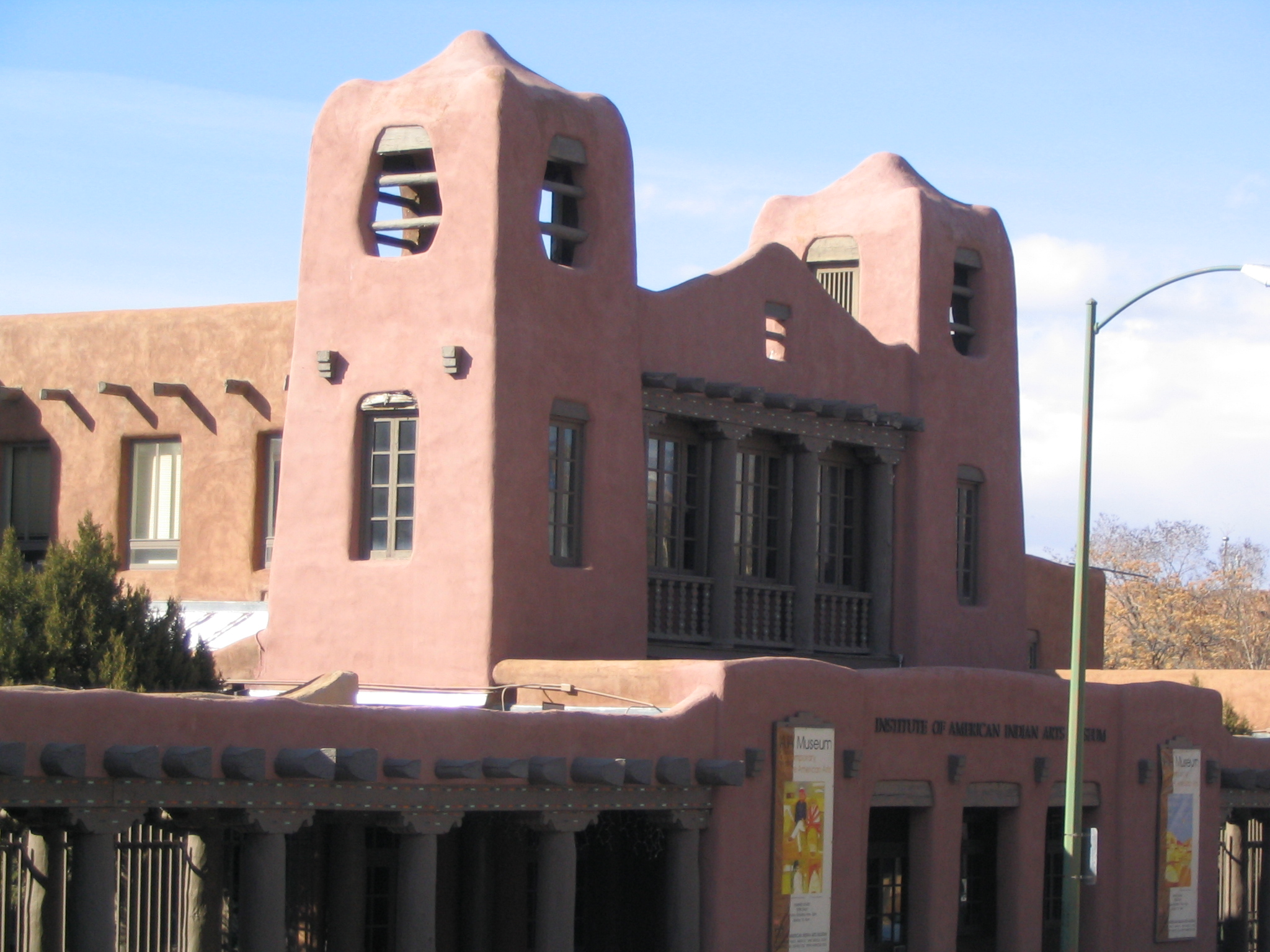
The MoCNA

== Partnerships ==
IAIA is a member of the American Indian Higher Education Consortium, which includes tribally and federally chartered institutions working to strengthen tribal nations and make a difference in the lives of American Indians and Alaska Natives. IAIA generally serves geographically isolated populations of Native Americans that have few other means of accessing education beyond the high school level.

During the early 1970s, faculty member Ed Wapp, Jr.'s E-Yah-Pah-Hah Chanters toured nationally with the Hanay Geiogamah's American Indian Theatre Ensemble, a company in residence at La MaMa Experimental Theatre Club in New York City. A program from this tour describes the musical ensemble as "students from the Institute of American Indian Arts at Santa Fe, N.M., and are under the direction of Ed Wapp, Jr. Their music is presented in both the traditional and contemporary American Indian forms. Songs are selected from the Plains, Eastern, Great Basin, Southwest and Northwest Coast areas of Indian Country."

== Student life ==
Undergraduate demographics as of Fall 2023
Race and ethnicity	Total
American Indian/Alaska Native	66%
Two or more races	14%
Hispanic	12%
White	7%
Unknown	1%
Economic diversity
Low-income (Note: The percentage of students who received an income-based federal Pell grant intended for low-income students.)	55%
Affluent (Note: The percentage of students who are a part of the American middle class at the bare minimum.)	45%

== Notable faculty ==
- Imogene Goodshot Arquero, Oglala Lakota beadwork artist
- Louis W. Ballard, Quapaw/Cherokee composer
- Gregory Cajete, Santa Clara Pueblo ethnobiologist and author
- Karita Coffey, Comanche ceramist
- Jon Davis, European-American poet
- Lois Ellen Frank, cultural anthropologist and food historian
- Allan Houser, Chiricahua Apache sculptor
- Charles Loloma, Hopi jeweler
- Otellie Loloma, Hopi potter, sculptor, painter
- Linda Lomahaftewa, Hopi/Choctaw printmaker
- Larry McNeil, Tlingit/Nisga'a photographer
- N. Scott Momaday, Kiowa writer
- Josephine Myers-Wapp, Comanche textile artist
- Wendy Ponca, Osage Nation fashion designer and textile artist
- Fritz Scholder, Luiseño painter
- Arthur Sze, Chinese-American poet
- James Thomas Stevens, Akwesasne Mohawk poet and writer
- Azalea Thorpe; an award for the fiber arts program is named in her honor
- Charlene Teters, Spokane painter and installation artist
- Gerald Vizenor, White Earth Ojibwe writer
- Will Wilson, Diné photographer
- Elizabeth Woody, Navajo/Tenino (Warm Springs)/Wasco-Yakama artist and author
- Melanie Yazzie, Navajo printmaker
- William S. Yellow Robe, Jr., Assiniboine writer

== Notable alumni ==
- Tristan Ahtone, Kiowa journalist
- Marcus Amerman, Choctaw Nation beadwork artist
- Ralph Aragon, Pueblo painter and sculptor
- Katie Doane Tulugaq Avery, Iñupiaq filmmaker
- Alexandra Backford, Aleut painter
- Esther Belin, Diné multimedia artist and writer
- Earl Biss, Crow painter
- Sherwin Bitsui, Navajo poet
- Diane Burns, Anishinaabe/Chemehuevi poet
- Jackie Larson Bread, Blackfoot beadwork artist
- T.C. Cannon (Kiowa/Caddo, 1946–1978), painter and printmaker
- Sherman Chaddlesone (Kiowa, 1947–2013), painter
- Eddie Chuculate, Muscogee/Cherokee author and journalist
- Kelly Church, Odawa/Ojibwe/Potawatomi basket maker, birchbark biter
- Karita Coffey, Comanche ceramic artist
- Bunky Echo-Hawk, Pawnee/Yakama painter
- Anita Fields, Osage/Muskogee ceramicist
- Bill Glass Jr., Cherokee Nation ceramic artist and sculptor
- Gina Gray (Osage, 1954–2014), printmaker and painter
- Benjamin Harjo Jr., Shawnee/Seminole painter and printmaker
- Joy Harjo, Muscogee poet and jazz musician, US Poet Laureate
- Allison Hedge Coke, American author
- Courtney M. Leonard, artist and filmmaker
- Kevin Locke, Lakota/Anishinaabe hoop dancer
- Gerald McMaster, Plains Cree Siksika First Nation author, artist, and curator
- Melissa Melero-Moose, Northern Paiute/Modoc mixed-media artist, curator, and cofounder of the Great Basin Native Artists
- America Meredith, Cherokee Nation painter, printmaker, and curator
- Patricia Michaels, Taos Pueblo fashion designer and textile artist
- Dan Namingha, Hopi-Tewa painter and sculptor
- Jody Naranjo, Santa Clara Pueblo potter
- Jamie Okuma, Luiseño/Shoshone-Bannock beadwork artist and fashion designer
- Tommy Orange, Cheyenne-Arapaho best-selling novelist
- Mary Gay Osceola, Seminole painter and printmaker
- Chris Pappan Kaw/Osage/Cheyenne River Lakota, ledger artist
- Kevin Red Star, Crow painter
- Layli Long Soldier, Oglala Lakota poet, writer, and artist.
- James Thomas Stevens, Akwesasne Mohawk poet
- Roxanne Swentzell, Santa Clara Pueblo ceramic artist and sculptor
- Charlene Teters, Spokane painter and installation artist
- Randy'L He-dow Teton, Shoshone-Bannock model for Sacajawea Gold Dollar coin
- Hulleah Tsinhnahjinnie, Seminole/Muscogee/Diné photographer, writer, curator, and educator
- Marty Two Bulls Sr., Oglala Lakota artist, Pulitzer Prize finalist
- Marie Watt, Seneca textile artist, printmaker and conceptual artist
- Sarah Biscarra-Dilley Interdisciplinary artist and the member of Black Salt Collective
- Terese Marie Mailhot, Sto:lo writer
- Jolene Yazzie, Navajo graphic designer
- Debra Yepa-Pappan, Jemez Pueblo/Korean digital multimedia artist and museum professional
- Alfred Young Man, PhD, Chippewa/Cree, painter, author, professor
- Vernon Bigman, Navajo, abstract painter

== Notable administration and staff ==
- Margaret L. Archuleta (1950–2023), art historian, curator, director of the IAIA Museum
- Lloyd Kiva New (Cherokee Nation, 1916–2002), co-founder and president
- Joseph Sanchez, curator and artist, director of the IAIA Museum, one of the Indian Group of Seven
- Duane Slick (Meskwaki/Ho-Chunk, born 1961), painter, taught at IAIA from 1992 until 1995

== See also ==
- C.N. Gorman Museum in Davis, California: similar to the IAIA Museum of Contemporary Native Arts, and has a contemporary intertribal Native art focus.
