= The Lure of the Local =

1997 book by Lucy Lippard

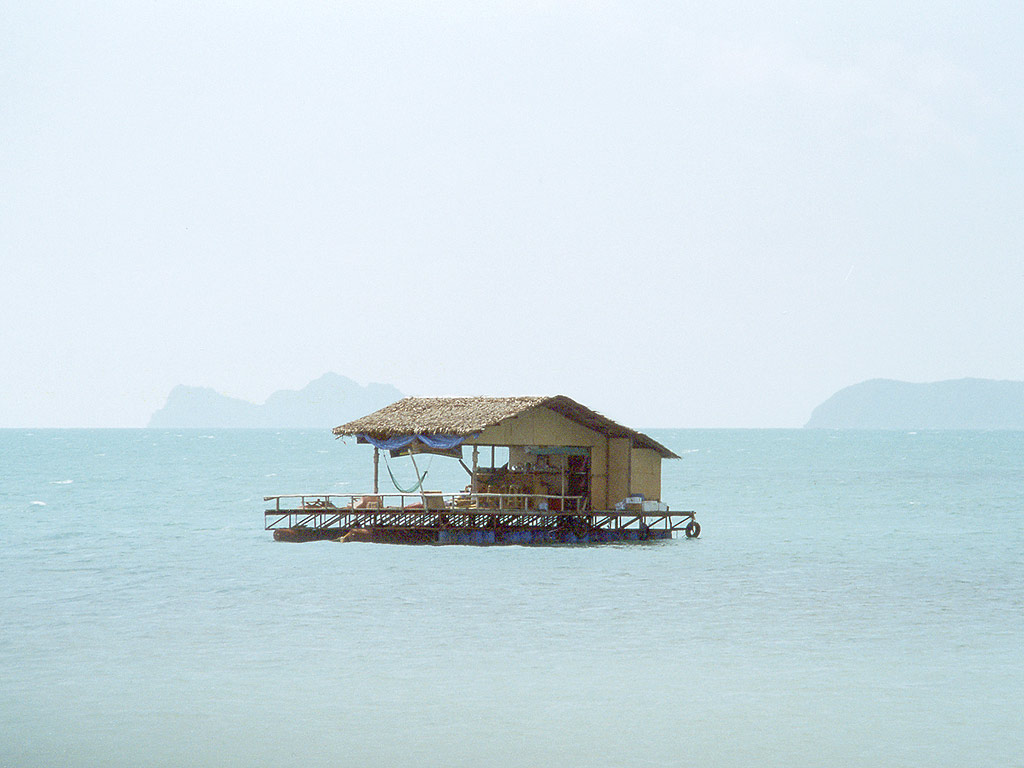
The cover of Lippard's 1997 book features a photograph similar to this: a home afloat like a raft on the sea.

The Lure of the Local: Sense of Place in a Multicentered Society is a 1997 study of the sense of place, by American author and 1968 Guggenheim Fellowship winner Lucy Lippard. The phrase, coined by Lippard, in this study refers to a sense of place that an individual can have about where she lives, or where he lived in his childhood. The New York Times calls the book a "wide-ranging survey". Lippard's work discusses a diverse array of topics including historic preservation, landscape photography, public art, and environmental pollution. The book's layout is unusual, encouraging readers to think locally, globally, and esthetically simultaneously. She is critical of the public art movement, and the lack of connection between the artists and the places their art is installed.
