= Sandy Fife Wilson =

Muscogee (Creek) art educator, fashion designer and artist

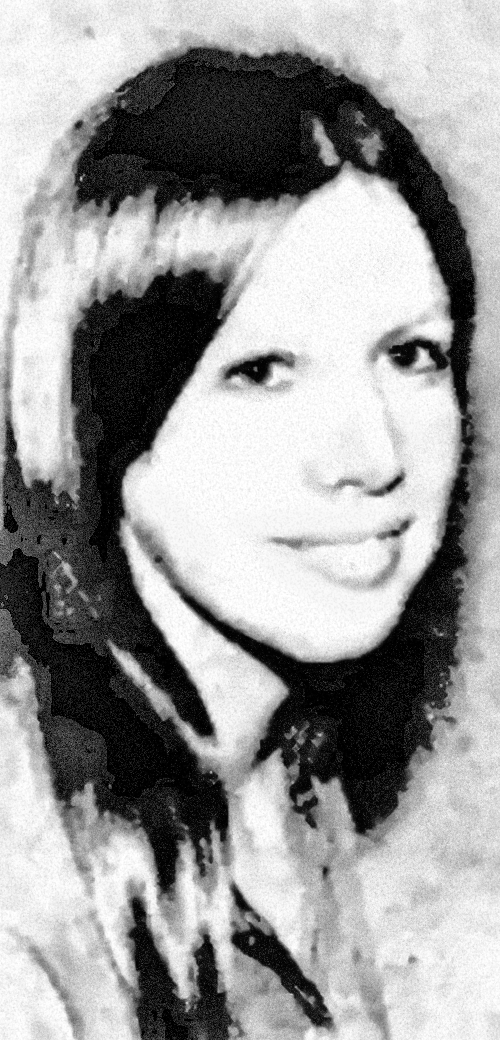
- Fife in 1971
- Born: 1950 (age 75–76); Dustin, Oklahoma
- Citizenship: American
- Occupations: art teacher, artist
- Years active: 1976–

Sandy Fife Wilson (born 1950) is a Muscogee (Creek) art educator, fashion designer and artist. After graduating from the Institute of American Indian Arts and Northeastern Oklahoma State University, she became an art teacher, first working in the public schools of Dewey, Oklahoma. When Josephine Wapp retired as the textile instructor at the Institute of American Indian Arts, Wilson was hired to teach the design courses. After three years, in 1979, she returned to Oklahoma and taught at Chilocco Indian School until it closed and then worked in the Morris Public School system until her retirement in 2009.

In 1976, Wilson and her sisters formed the Fife Collection focusing on designing contemporary fashion, but incorporating traditional Southeastern Woodlands techniques and motifs. Their works were shown at many museum venues and festivals, like the Coconino Center for the Arts, Southern Plains Indian Museum, and Red Earth Festival. Her later career has included works of traditional Creek split-cane baskets, shell carvings, and fingerweavings. Wilson has participated in numerous art and fashion shows throughout her career, winning first place honors in 1972 at the Scottsdale National Indian Arts Exhibition, the Grand Heritage Award of the Five Civilized Tribes Museum in 1995 and placing 2nd in the traditional objects category of the Santa Fe Indian Market in 2016.

== Early life ==
Sandy Fife was born in 1950 in Dustin, Oklahoma to Carmen (née Griffin) and James Fife. She grew up on her grandfather's allotment which sits on the border of the Hughes County-Okfuskee County line. The youngest of six children, she came from a long line of artists and teachers. Her grandfather was a wood and stone carver, her father drew with colored pencils and chalks, and from the time she was ten years old, her mother, who was a teacher, taught her fingerweaving. Fife attended Graham High School in Weleetka, Oklahoma and then went on to further her studies at the Institute of American Indian Arts in Santa Fe, New Mexico from 1965 to 1969. At the institute, she studied with world-renowned artists and her courses included painting with Neil Parsons (Blackfeet) and Fritz Scholder (Luiseño), printmaking with Seymour Tubis, and traditional design with Josephine Wapp (Comanche). In 1969, Fife begang her university studies at the College of Santa Fe, but in 1970, she transferred to Northeastern Oklahoma State University, graduating in 1973 with a bachelor's degree in art and finishing her graduate education there in 1978.

== Career ==
After completing her bachelor's degree, Fife taught for two years at the Dewey Public School. In 1975, she married Lawrence A. "Al" Wilson, who was a math instructor. The couple moved to Santa Fe that same year when, Wilson took over the design courses at the Institute of American Indian Arts, previously offered by Josephine Wapp, who had retired in 1973. She combined traditional and contemporary trends in her curricula, which included classes on "Decorative Techniques", "Traditional and Contemporary Fashion Design", "Traditional Techniques", and "Weaving and Basketmaking". Making sure that her students were grounded in the history of traditional garments, she taught them how to incorporate motifs into contemporary designs. Her weaving course used a wide variety of looms and techniques, utilizing diverse materials other than textiles, like bone, feathers, leather, and porcupine quills. She also included instruction in beadwork, teaching students how to use a bead loom.

Wilson organized a fashion group, "Full Moon Fashions" to allow her students to design and market their works, and build rapport with the local community. Pupils also served as models and emceed the show. One of those, who served as emcee in 1977, was Wendy Ponca (Osage). The show was popular and became an annual event, with the students also traveling throughout the state and to neighboring states to show their work. In 1979, Wilson was offered a teaching position with the Bureau of Indian Affairs at Chilocco Indian School and returned to Oklahoma, where her three children Laura, Clint, and Dan were born. When Chilocco closed, in 1980, she began teaching art in the Morris Public Schools, where she remained until her retirement in 2009.

As a student, Wilson had participated in several showings of her work, including a demonstration at the Wichita Art Museum and her selection to participate as an artist in 1969 at the Woodstock Music & Art Fair. After having also shown work in Oklahoma and Virginia, in 1972, Wilson placed first in the contemporary textile category at the Scottsdale National Indian Arts Exhibition. In 1976, she co-founded with her sisters Phyllis and Sharon, the Fife Collection, Inc., which focused on fashion design and incorporated traditional motifs and techniques from the Southeastern Woodlands peoples. These included Cherokee fingerweaving, Delaware appliqué, Muscogee themes and designs from pottery and artifacts, as well as Seminole patchwork designs, presented in contemporary garments, adorned with beadwork, embroidery, and ribbonwork.

In 1979, the Southern Plains Indian Museum hosted a month-long exhibit of the Fife Collection's works, which also included pieces from their mother, oldest sister Jimmie Carole, and youngest sister Robin. Though primarily focused on Native American fashion, the exhibit also included paintings by Jimmie Carol, embroidery works by Robin, handbags and jewelry by Wilson, and other fabric arts like quilts and wall hangings. Throughout her career, Wilson has participated in numerous art and fashion shows hosted at various venues, like the Kirkpatrick Center, and Governor's Arts Awards at the Oklahoma State Capitol, both in Oklahoma City; Broadmarket Square in Colorado Springs, Colorado; the Indian Paintbrush Gallery in Siloam Springs, Arkansas, the Coconino Center for the Arts in Flagstaff, Arizona, the Red Earth Festival, and the Santa Fe Indian Market, the "largest juried Native American art market in the world".

In 2007, Wilson returned to the classroom, to study basketweaving, flute making, Muscogee hymns, pottery making and shell carving at the College of the Muscogee Nation, in Okmulgee, Oklahoma. She incorporated these skills into her classrooms and after her retirement presented demonstrations at the Northeastern State University Center for Tribal Studies. Her later work focuses on traditional split-cane Creek baskets, finger-woven apparel, and shell carvings. Among the many awards she has won in her career, in 1995 Wilson won the Grand Heritage Award of the Five Civilized Tribes Museum in Muskogee, Oklahoma and in 2016 placed 2nd in the traditional objects category of the Santa Fe Indian Market.
