= Margarete Bagshaw =

American artist (1964–2015)

- Born: Margarete Terrazas; November 11, 1964; Albuquerque, New Mexico
- Died: March 19, 2015 (aged 50)
- Other name: Margarete Bagshaw-Tindel
- Citizenship: American
- Occupation: Artist

"My World is not Flat", 2011 painting by Bagshaw

Margarete Bagshaw (November 11, 1964 – March 19, 2015) was an American artist known for her paintings and pottery. She was descended from the Tewa people of Kháˀ Póvi or Khaˀpʼoe Ówîngeh, Santa Clara Pueblo, New Mexico.

== Early life ==
Margarete Bagshaw was born November 11, 1964, and was the daughter of artist Helen Hardin and Pat Terrazas, and the granddaughter of Santa Clara Pueblo artist Pablita Velarde.

Bagshaw grew up in New Mexico and lived most of her life between Albuquerque and Santa Fe, however as a young child she was living with her mother for several years in Colombia and Guatemala.

She married at age 19 to Greg Tindel, a master framer. She did not start to create her own artwork until 1990, at the age of 26, while she was pregnant with her second child. Early in her work as an artist, her spouse Tindel encouraged her to share her artwork with others. Bagshaw started having more confidence in her work as an artist, after a series of positive responses followed.

== Art career ==
In 2006, after divorcing and settling her grandmother's estate, she moved to the U.S. Virgin Islands, living with her second husband Dan McGuinness. She was a founding partner and co-builder of ISW Studios — a recording and multimedia studio. While in the Virgin Islands she continued to paint and send her work back to New Mexico.

The couple returned to New Mexico in 2009. In 2009 until 2015, the couple owned Golden Dawn Gallery in New Mexico.

In 2012, Margarete Bagshaw co-founded the Pablita Velarde Museum of Indian Women, dedicated to her grandmother's legacy as well as other female Native American artists in Santa Fe, however it closed in 2015 when Margarete passed away.

In 2012, Bagshaw wrote and published her memoirs Teaching My Spirit to Fly along with her mother's biography A Straight Line Curved by Kate Nelson, and her grandmother's biography Pablita Velarde, In Her Own Words by Shelby Tisdale. Bagshaw's memoirs chronicled her early life living with a family of famous artists. She also wrote about her artistic and business life and detailed betrayal by a best friend and family.

On March 19, 2015, Margarete Bagshaw died at the age of 50 after having a stroke and then subsequently being diagnosed with brain cancer.

== Publications ==
Throughout her 20-year career she was known for her use of color, composition and texture. Bagshaw was featured in many publications including: The SantaFean magazine, The Essential Guide magazine, Southwest Art magazine, Native Peoples magazine, the New Mexico Magazine and recently both the Albuquerque Journal and ABQ Arts. She was one of the featured artists in the 2003 book — NDN Art: Contemporary Native American Art, The New Mexico Artist Series as well as the 1998 book — Pueblo Artists Portraits, by Toba Tucker.

== Exhibitions ==
Bagshaw took part in over a dozen major museum exhibitions, including the Eiteljorge Museum Of American and Western Art in Indianapolis, Indiana, the Wheelwright Museum of the American Indian in Santa Fe, New Mexico, the Hamden Museum in Virginia, and numerous invitational shows with the Museum of Albuquerque, New Mexico. As the subject of a documentary film project, Bagshaw spoke at the dedication ceremony for the donation of "The White Collection" (featuring a number of Bagshaw's works), at the Lakeview Museum in Illinois in September 2008.

In 2010, Bagshaw presented a one-woman show at the Smoki Museum in Prescott, Arizona. In 2012, Bagshaw had a solo exhibition, Margarete Bagshaw: Breaking the Rules at the Museum of Indian Arts and Culture. In 2013, The Color of Oil: Paintings by Margarete Bagshaw exhibition was held at the Ellen Noël Art Museum. In 2016, the Museum of Indian Arts and Culture honored Bagshaw in an exhibition, along with Josephine Myers-Wapp and Jeri Ah-be-hill.

In 2019, the Blue Rain Gallery in Santa Fe held an exhibition of four generations of painters from this family, titled, Pablita Velarde, Helen Hardin, Margarete Bagshaw and Helen K. Tindel: A Painting Dynasty From The Land of Enchantment.

== Lectures and talks ==
In 2011 at the annual conference of the Folk Art Society in Santa Fe, Bagshaw spoke about the tension between carrying on Native traditions and her impetus toward more modernist expression. In 2011, Bagshaw was invited to be a speaker for Women's History Month at the National Museum of the American Indian at the Smithsonian in Washington, D.C.

== Personal life ==
She married in 1984 to Greg Tindel and together they had two children, Forrest Tindel and Helen K. Tindel. Her daughter is a painter. The couple eventually divorced in 2006.

Her second marriage was to Dan McGuinness and they remained together until her death in 2015.
