= Silver Horn =

American painter

- Háuñ:gùñ
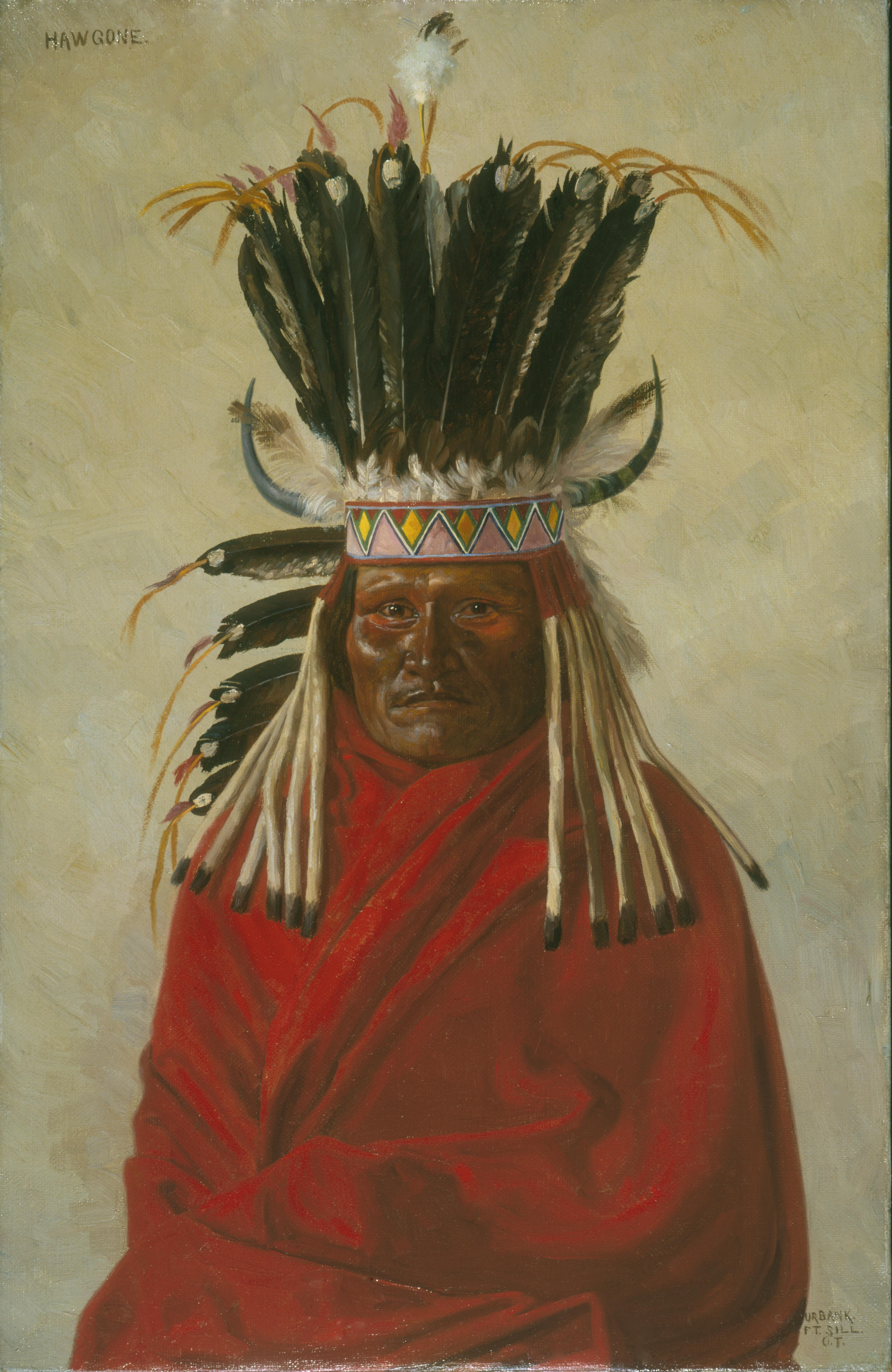
- Painting of Silver Horn by E.A Burbank, 1898.
- Born: c. 1861; Kansas, U.S.
- Died: Stecker, Oklahoma, U.S.
- Known for: Ledger artist of the Kiowa Indians

Silver Horn or Háuñ:gùñ: (c. 1861 – ?), also known as Haungooah, was a Kiowa ledger artist.

== Background ==
Silver Horn was born c. 1861 to Á:gyâdè (Agiati or Gathering Feathers) and Sa-Poodle (Traveling in the Rain) and was a member of the Kiowa Indian tribe of Oklahoma. His Kiowa name, Háuñ:gùñ: (often spelled as Haungooah) refers to sunlight reflecting off a buffalo horn, making it gleam like a polished, white metal. He was a well-known artist from the early reservation period who was one of the most respected and talented Plains Indian artists in his time. Haungooah Silverhorn married Hattie Tau-Goom (Bending Knee Woman) together they had 8 children born to their union. The oldest son name was Billie Bow "James" Silverhorn who was a well known Peyote Man. There was May Haungooah, George "Dutch" Silverhorn, Max Silverhorn Sr, Iva Haungooah, Arthur Silverhorn, Sarah Louise Haungooah, Chester Silverhorn.

Silver Horn's father was Agiati or "Gathering Feathers", who was a calendar keeper. Agiati was the chosen artistic successor of his uncle Dohasan, who was the primary calendar keeper for the Kiowas throughout the 19th century.

== Artwork ==
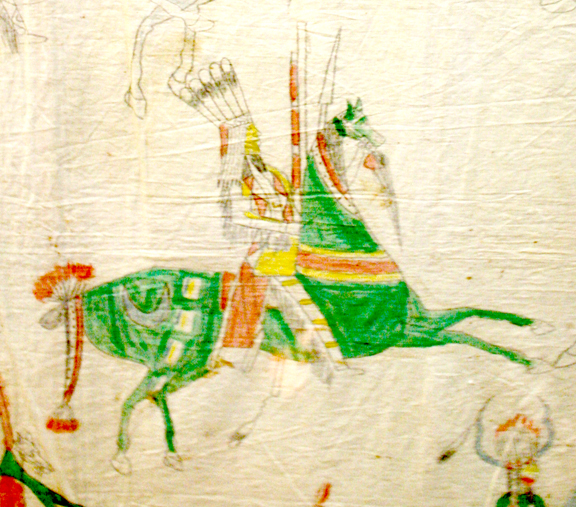
Detail of ledger painting on muslin by Silver Horn, ca. 1880, Oklahoma History Center

He was mostly known for his skills in working with different mediums and materials such as graphite, colored pencil, crayon, pen and ink, and water color on hide, muslin and paper. He produced over a thousand illustrations and works of art between 1870 and 1920. He developed and created very keen visuals of Kiowa culture, from traditional images, warfare, and coup counting to depictions of the sun dance, early Peyote religion, and daily life. Silver Horn had witnessed traumatic changes as the Kiowa people went from a nomadic, buffalo-hunting culture to reservation life and forced assimilation into white society. The traumatic changes were depicted in his artwork.

The depictions that Silver Horn would render were visionary images that were represented in abstract form on shields and events of the years past as a record in the pictorial calendar. Many tribes of the Plains area used pictorial art to maintain a calendar as means of recording happenings as well as to illustrate stories. Silver Horn developed a complex calendar system with events recorded for summer and winter of each year and most calendars had very simple pictures that helped calendar keepers remember the name of each year. His drawings of warfare depicted events of the past as well as more recent conflicts, while his images of ceremonies included rituals that were beginning at that time. He also created illustrations of myths and other oral traditions such as supernatural figures.

== Legacy ==
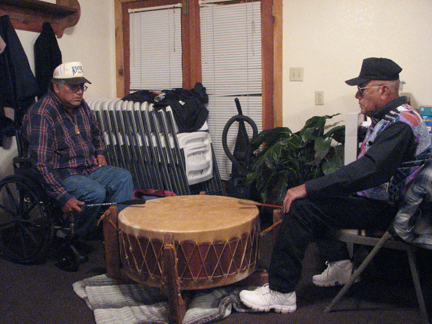
Mac Silverhorn (Comanche), grandson of Silver Horn, drumming with friend at Redstone Baptist Church

Silver Horn's works are still shown regularly and an extensive collection of them is held in the permanent collection of the Museum of New Mexico (MNM). In 1995, a large traveling exhibit featuring works from the MNM and the private collection of his great-niece, Jeri Ah-be-hill, selected by the Smithsonian Museum of Natural History, toured the United States. Ah-be-hill was a noted expert on Native American clothing and both of her daughters, Teri Greeves and Keri Ataumbi are known for their beadwork and jewelry designs. Silver Horn taught his great-nephew, Stephen Mopope how to paint on hides. Mopope went on to become one of the Kiowa Six. Today many of his family members are artists. His grandsons James, Dutch, and Max Silverhorn are all known for their German silver work, beadwork, and featherwork. His great-granddaughter, Katherine Dickerson is a Kiowa beadworker, German silver worker, and moccasin maker. Another grandson, Art "Haungooah" Cody, married into the Santa Clara pueblo in New Mexico and became an award-winning potter. Art's son, Dean Haungooah continues in that tradition.
