= Patricia Michaels =

Native American fashion designer from New Mexico, U.S.

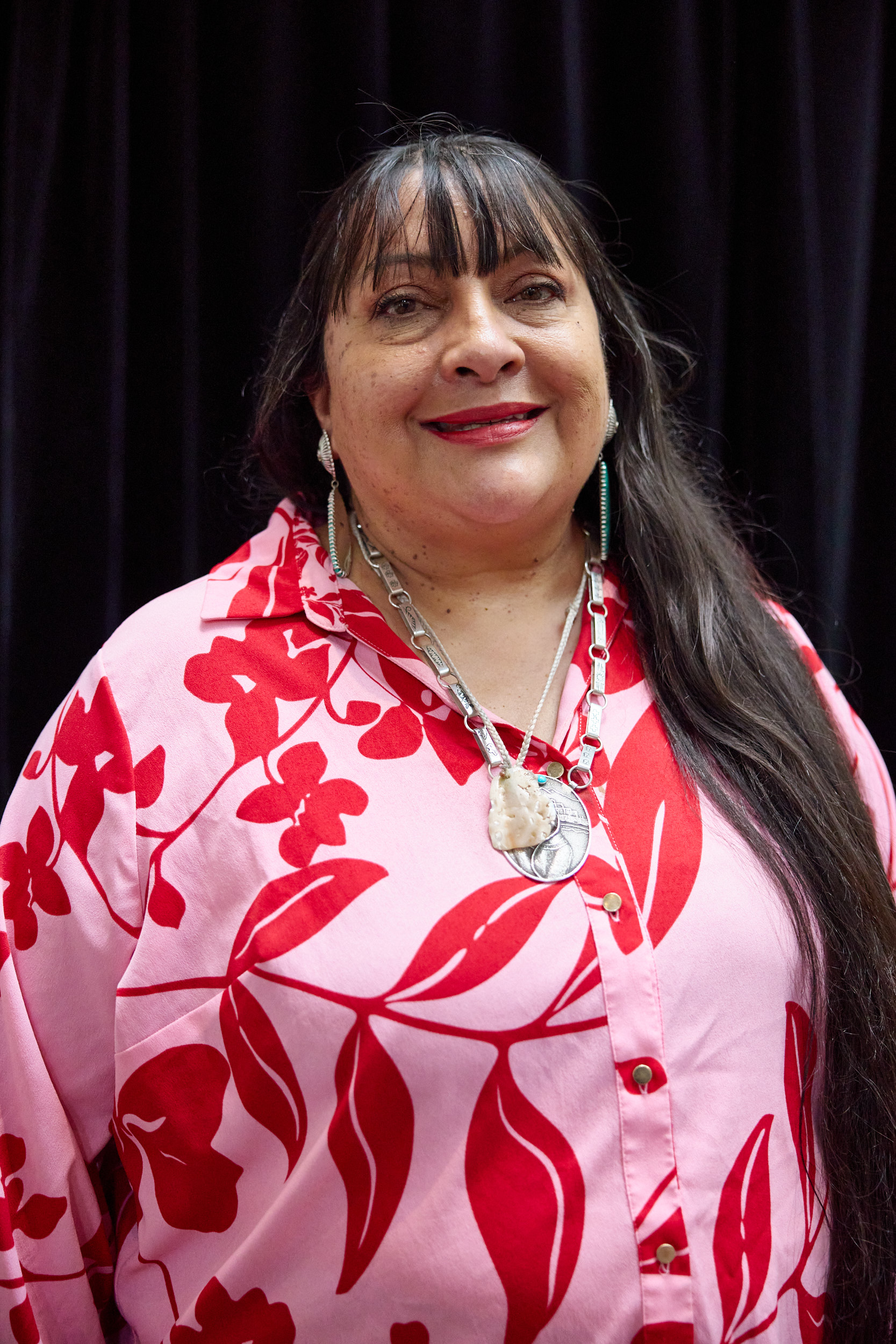
- Michaels at the SWAIA Gala 2025
- Born: 1966 (age 59–60); New Mexico, U.S.
- Citizenship: Pueblo of Taos and American
- Education: Institute of American Indian Arts; Chicago Art Institute
- Known for: Native American fashion, textile arts
- Notable work: Tantoo in Flight (2023)
- Partner: James Duran
- Awards: New Mexico's Governor’s Award for Excellence in the Arts (2023); Museum of Indian Arts and Culture Living Treasure (2024)
- Website: patricia-michaels.com

Patricia Michaels (born 1966, New Mexico) is a Native American fashion designer who works under the fashion label PM Waterlily. She is a citizen of the Pueblo of Taos.

Michaels was the first Native American to appear on the popular fashion design-focused television series, Project Runway. A finalist on season 11, she returned to compete in Project Runway All Stars. She has exhibited across the United States and internationally, including in South Africa and New Zealand.

== Early life and education ==
Patricia Michaels was born in 1966 in New Mexico to Eddie Michaels (Polish-American) and Juanita Turley (Taos Pueblo). Her stepfather, Frank Turley, was a blacksmith. She grew up on Canyon Road in Santa Fe, New Mexico, where her parents owned an art gallery. She often visited Taos Pueblo and, as a teenager, moved there to live with her maternal grandparents, Ben and Manuelita Marcus.

Dyslexia made schoolwork challenging for Michaels, but she graduated from Santa Fe High School. In 1985, she apprenticed in costume design at the Santa Fe Opera. She studied at the Institute of American Indian Arts, where she joined the fashion collective "Native Uprising", led by instructor Wendy Ponca (Osage). IAIA co-founder Lloyd Kiva New (Cherokee Nation) told Michaels, "First Santa Fe and then Paris!" After IAIA, she went on to study at New's alma mater, the Chicago Art Institute.

In 2001, Michaels traveled to Milan, Italy, where she apprenticed with a tailor. She then moved to New York with her two young children.

== Fashion career ==
Through PM Waterlily, Michaels creates ready-to-wear fashion, couture fashion, jewelry, and accessories. She specializes in hand-painted silks.

At the 2010 Santa Fe Indian Market, Michaels won best of the textiles classification with a contemporary design which was seen as "a new Native chic." This local breakthrough paved the way for her 2013 participation in Mercedes-Benz Fashion Week in New York, as a finalist on Project Runway.

In March 2015, Michaels took part in the Stars of Project Runway fashion show during Fashion Week El Paseo. In September 2016, Michaels held a fashion show of her work at New York Fashion Week. Some of Michaels' designs were featured in the 2017 SWAIA Haute Couture Fashion Show in August 2017. Later that year, she was one of ten designers to represent the United States at World Fashion Week, Paris 2017.

In 2023, Michaels designed a dress, titled "Tantoo in Flight", for Canadian actress Tantoo Cardinal to wear to the premiere of Killers of the Flower Moon at the 2023 Cannes Film Festival. The dress, which was inspired by men's eagle headdresses, featured eagle feathers on the skirt. Cardinal wore the dress again for the Santa Fe Indian Market Gala in August of that year. In April 2024, Michaels took part in the first SWAIA Native Fashion Week in Santa Fe.

=== Project Runway ===
Michaels became the first Native American designer to participate in Project Runway, an Emmy Award-winning reality television in which diverse fashion designers compete against each other. She competed in Project Runway season 11, which aired in 2013, and was runner-up.

In 2014, Michaels returned to the show for Project Runway All Stars. Her appearance on the show helped expose new audiences to Native American fashion.

== Visual art ==
In 2019, Deb Haaland (Laguna Pueblo), New Mexico's first Native congresswoman, now Secretary of the Interior, commissioned Michaels to design a chair as part of the "A Seat at the Table" art installation at the Edward Kennedy Institute in Massachusetts.

In 2020, Michaels took part in a project organized by Naomi Campbell, in which artists created face masks to raise money for charities.

== Awards and honors ==
In 2013, Taos named Michaels the Citizen of the Year, and in 2014, the Smithsonian's National Museum of the American Indian gave her their inaugural Arts and Design Award. The Bill & Melinda Gates Foundation chose Michaels to deliver the keynote address of their Millennium Scholars Program in 2016.

In 2023, Michaels received New Mexico's Governor's Award for Excellence in the Arts. The Museum of Indian Arts and Culture named Michaels a Living Treasure in 2024.

== Personal life ==
She was married to painter Tony Abeyta (Navajo), whom she divorced in 2008. The couple has two children: a son, Gabriel Abeyta, and a daughter, Margeaux Abeyta, both of whom are also artists. After living in Santa Fe for years, she moved back to Taos Pueblo in 2023, where she lives with her partner James Duran.

== Selected exhibitions ==
- 2015–17: Native Fashion Now, Peabody Essex Museum, Salem MA; Portland Art Museum, Portland, OR; Philbrook Museum of Art, Tulsa, OK; National Museum of the American Indian, New York, NY, with catalog
- 2024: Patricia Michaels: Fashion and Fantasy, Wright Contemporary, Taos, NM
- 2024: Patricia Michaels: Bringing Awareness for Missing and Murdered Indigenous Women and Relatives, Fralin Museum of Art, University of Virginia
- 2024–25: Painted by Hand: The Textiles of Patricia Michaels, Museum of Indian Arts and Culture, Santa Fe, NM
