= Josephine Myers-Wapp =

Comanche weaver and educator from Oklahoma

- circa 1930, probably made while a student as Haskell Institute, photo by Moore Studio, Lawrence, Kansas
- Born: February 10, 1912 near Apache, Oklahoma
- Died: October 24, 2014 (aged 102); Lawton, Oklahoma
- Other names: Josephine Myers, Josephine Wapp
- Citizenship: Comanche Nation and U.S.
- Occupations: educator, textile artist
- Years active: 1934–2013
- Known for: finger weaving and inaugurating Native American traditional arts at both Chilocco School and the Institute of American Indian Arts

Josephine Myers-Wapp (February 10, 1912 – October 26, 2014) was a Comanche textile artist and educator. She taught art at Chilocco Indian School before joining the faculty of Institute of American Indian Arts in Santa Fe. She taught weaving, design, and dance at the institute, and in 1968 was one of the coordinators for a dance exhibit at the Mexican Summer Olympic Games. In 1973, she retired from teaching to focus on her own work, exhibiting throughout the Americas and in Europe and the Middle East.

She has work in the permanent collection of the IAIA and has been featured at the Smithsonian Institution. Between 2014 and 2016, she was featured in an exhibition of Native American women artists at the Museum of Indian Arts and Culture in Santa Fe.

== Early life ==
Josephine Myers was born on February 10, 1912, on her grandmother's allotment near Apache, Oklahoma, to Hevah (née Lena Fischer) and James H. Myers. She was one of nine children: Mima, Randlett Cragg, Rudolph Fisher, Catherine, Josephine, Melvin, Walker, Vincent, and Alvin. Myers attended St. Patrick's Indian Mission School in Anadarko, Oklahoma, and completed high school at the Haskell Institute in Lawrence, Kansas, studying to become a secretary. In 1933, she went to study at the Santa Fe Indian School under a program designed to train Native Americans to teach art at the American Indian boarding schools. For two years, she studied fingerweaving and loom-weaving, as well as pottery making under Maria Martinez.

== Career ==
In November 1934, Myers returned to Oklahoma and started the first art classes at Chilocco Indian School. When she began her work, the school only purchased one loom, but other departments at the school helped to build looms and spinning wheels. She taught basket weaving, beading, and pottery making to beginners, and taught the more advanced students to make rag dolls, cross-stitch, dyeing, fingerweaving, rag weaving, and spinning. She continued to teach art and married Edward Wapp c. 1940, giving birth to their first child, Barbara, in August 1940. Edward Jr., who would become a noted Native American flautist, was born in 1943. She expanded the arts department throughout her time at Chilocco and by the 1950s had created a drama department, which performed ceremonial dances for the White House Conference on Children and Youth in 1960. She continued her own studies during the summers and earned her bachelor's degree in education in 1959 from Oklahoma State University. She taught at Chilocco until 1961, then taught briefly at the Santa Fe Indian School before being selected as one of the first teachers for the newly established Institute of American Indian Arts.

Wapp was one of the main teachers of traditional arts at IAIA, teaching courses in beadwork, costume and fashion design, traditional art techniques, textiles, and weaving. Focused on utilizing primarily natural materials, she taught her students to appreciate Native and Native-inspired garments and accessories and tried to impart the tribal traditions from which the techniques had arisen. Wapp also taught a course in traditional Indian dance. While at IAIA, she learned the Eastern Woodlands tribal tradition of fingerweaving, which was not in her Comanche heritage. Of the three basic patterns woven without a loom, Wapp became best known for the arrowpoint pattern, which is the most difficult. She also continued her own studies, earning a master's degree from the University of New Mexico. She encouraged her students to take the skills they learned in their home economics courses and bring them into her traditional techniques course, as an expression of their tribal pride.

In 1968, Wapp and ceramicist Otellie Loloma, a colleague at IAIA, coordinated a dance exhibition with their students which they performed at the White House and then at the 1968 Summer Olympics in Mexico City. Two years later, the school organized a fashion club, which participated in fashion shows throughout the country. Her students soon realized that by participating in Wapp's fashion design classes, they'd be able to create their own designs and travel. In 1972, she took students to fashion shows in Houston, Texas; the Indian Fashion Show at the Denver Art Museum in Colorado; New York City; and exhibited fashion designs at the La Fonda on the Plaza in Santa Fe. The following year, she retired from teaching to focus on her own work.

After retirement, Wapp gave demonstrations of hand weaving techniques and spoke widely on traditional Indian arts. She served on the committee which founded the Comanche National Museum and Cultural Center in Lawton, Oklahoma, and her work was displayed at the museum's opening in 2007. She served on the museum's board for several years, and in 2009 was the featured artist at an event showcasing her works for her 97th birthday. Wapp's work was featured at the opening of the National Museum of the American Indian in Manhattan in 1994, to help fundraise for the 2001 projected opening of the National Museum of the American Indian at the National Mall in Washington, D. C. In 2009, her work was exhibited at the Oklahoma State Capitol in a solo exhibition titled The Artistic Legacy of Josephine Myers-Wapp: The Weaving of Stories and Tradition. In 2013, she was the recipient of the Povi'ka Award of the Santa Fe Indian Market in recognition of her leadership and support to Native American artists and communities.

== Death and legacy ==
Wapp died on October 26, 2014, in Lawton, Oklahoma and was buried at the Fairview Cemetery in her hometown of Apache. Between 2014 and 2016, an exhibit honoring Native American women artists, featuring works by Jeri Ah-be-hill, Margarete Bagshaw, and Wapp, was on display at the Museum of Indian Arts and Culture in Santa Fe. The Institute of American Indian Art's Museum of Contemporary Native Art, in downtown Santa Fe, has some of her work in its permanent collection. Her teaching career was widely influential; Wendy Ponca, who followed Sandy Wilson in teaching Wapp's traditional techniques courses in 1982, drew on both Wapp and Wilson's legacies in teaching Native fashion designers into the 1990s. She also won multiple awards for her contemporary Native fashion designs, taking first prize from the Santa Fe Indian Market every year from 1982 until 1987. Phyllis Wahahrocktah-Tasi, director of the Comanche National Museum and Cultural Center, was one of Wapp's students.
