= Teri Greeves =

Native American beadwork artist

- Born: 1970 (age 55–56); Lander, Wind River Reservation, Wyoming, United States
- Education: Self-taught, BA University of California, Santa Cruz, St. John's College, Cabrillo College
- Known for: Beadwork
- Movement: Beadwork art
- Spouse: Dennis Esquivel
- Website: terigreevesbeadwork.com

Teri Greeves (born 1970) is a Native American beadwork artist, living in Santa Fe, New Mexico. She is enrolled in the Kiowa Indian Tribe of Oklahoma.

== Early life and education ==
Teri Greeves was born on the Wind River Reservation in Wyoming in 1970. While Greeves was growing up, her mother, Jeri Ah-be-hill, owned a trading post on the reservation. "By repeating to customers what I heard her saying when she was selling to and educating the public," Teri says, "I unknowingly gained a broad knowledge of different beadwork from tribes around the US."

Greeves learned beadwork from her mother, who learned from her mother, as well as her aunt. Greeves has said "My grandmother is present in everything I do." Greeves was already an accomplished beadwork artist at the age of eight. She also received instruction from Zeedora Enos (Shoshone) and Calvin Magpie (Cheyenne). Greeves attended the University of California, Santa Cruz, where she earned her Bachelor of Arts degree in American Studies in 1995. She has also studied at St. John's College in 1988 and Cabrillo College in 1993.

== Materials and techniques ==
Greeves employs a variety of beadwork techniques in her art. She first learned to use the lane stitch technique to attach beads onto hide, a technique she learned from her aunt. The lane stitch technique is derived from quill-work, especially in the way the beads lie, the designs built up from many rows of stitch, as well as the importance of negative space in the design. She uses a loom for beaded bracelets. Her larger pictorial work involved beads stitched onto brain-tanned deer hide, which she often mounts onto wood or other structures. For her Best of Show piece in the 1999 Santa Fe Indian Market, she beaded a parade scene onto hide stretched over an antique umbrella frame.

== Themes ==
She strives to portray Kiowa realities and oral history, her own life experiences, and pop imagery. For instance, in her piece, Kiowa Aw-Day, she uses materials historically germane to her tribe, as well as a pair of Chuck Taylor sneakers. The popular culture reference of the Chuck Taylors shows Kiowa culture thriving in the contemporary world. The dichotomy presented through the materiality of the piece reflects on life as an American Indian, highlighting the inherent distinction between white and Native experiences in contemporary America. She is widely known for her fully beaded tennis shoes, which feature pictorial elements on solid, lane-stitched backgrounds. Her humor is evident throughout her work.

Reflecting on her tribal history, Greeves said, "A long time ago, a Kiowa woman brought beadwork to her Kiowa people. She was compelled to express herself and her experience as a Kiowa woman of her day. My grandmother was a beadworker. She too was compelled to bead/express herself and her experience as a Kiowa living during her time. ... I must express myself and my experience as a twenty-first-century Kiowa, and I do it, like all of those unknown artists before me, through beadwork."

== Writing ==
Greeves is a regular contributing writer to First American Art Magazine.

== Personal life ==
Teri Greeves is married to Dennis Esquivel, an Odawa/Ojibwe painter and woodworker enrolled in the Grand Traverse Band of Ottawa and Chippewa Indians. They have two sons. Teri's sister, Keri Ataumbi, is a noted jeweler, painter, and conceptual artist. Greeves frequently travels back to Oklahoma to maintain a close connection to her Kiowa relatives and friends.

== Collections ==
Greeves' work is found in such public collections as British Museum, Heard Museum, Montclair Art Museum, the Museum of Arts and Design, the Brooklyn Museum, the Denver Art Museum, the Haffenreffer Museum of Anthropology, the Hampton University Museum, the Heard Museum, the Joselyn Museum, the School of American Research, the National Museum of the American Indian, the New Mexico Museum of Art, the Sequoyah National Research Center in Little Rock, Arkansas, and the Museum of Indian Arts and Culture.

== Selected exhibitions ==
- 2022 MacKenzie Art Gallery, Regina: Radical Stitch;
- 2019 Minneapolis Institute of Art, Minneapolis, MN: Hearts of Our People: Native Women Artists
- 2018 Museum of International Folk Art, Santa Fe, NM: Beadwork Adorns the World
- 2017 Museum of Indian Arts and Culture, Santa Fe, NM: Stepping Out: 10,000 Years of Walking the West
- 2016 Oklahoma State University Museum of Art, Stillwater, OK: From the Belly of Our Being
- 2016 Museum of Indian Arts and Culture, Santa Fe, NM: Into the Future: Culture Power in Native American Art
- 2016 Sherry Leedy Contemporary Art Gallery, Kansas City, MO: Back Where They Came From
- 2014 Crystal Bridges Museum, Bentonville, AR: State of the Art
- 2013 New Mexico Museum of Art, Santa Fe, NM: Alcoves 12.9
- 2011 Brooklyn Museum, Brooklyn, NY: Tipi: Heritage of the Great Plains
- 2011 O'Kane Gallery, University of Houston, Houston, TX: Storied Beads: The Art of Teri Greeves
- 2011 Riverside Metropolitan Museum, Riverside, CA: Beyond Craft
- 2009 Royal British Columbia Museum, Canada, Treasures: The World's Cultures from the British Museum
- 2009 Fuller Craft Museum, Brockton, MA: The Perfect Fit: Shoes Tell Stories
- 2009 Museum of Indian Arts and Culture, Santa Fe, NM: Native Couture II
- 2007 Craft In America: Expanding Traditions, traveling exhibit in conjunction with PBS series "Craft in America", various cities
- 2007 New Mexico Museum of Art, Santa Fe, NM: How the West is One, Semi-permanent exhibit
- 2006 New Mexico Museum of Art, Santa Fe, NM: Native Pop
- 2006 Museum of Indian Arts and Culture, Santa Fe, NM: Wondrous Works
- 2005 Museum of Art and Design, New York, NY: Changing Hands 2
- 2005 National Museum of the American Indian, Washington DC: Our Lives
- 2004 Fort Lewis College, Durango, CO: Teri Greeves: Narratives in Beadwork
- 2002 Museum of the Southwest, Midland, TX: Beadwork by Teri Greeves
- 2002 Museum of Fine Arts, Santa Fe, NM: Mind Over Matter. Reworking Women's Work
- 2002 Heard Museum, Phoenix, AZ: Be Dazzled: Masterworks of Jewelry and Beadwork from the Heard Museum
- 2002 National Cowboy & Western Heritage Museum, Oklahoma City, OK: Winter Camp Honoring the Legacy
- 2001 Katonah Museum of Art, Katonah, NY: Horse Tales: Two Centuries of American Cultural Icons
- 2000 Southwest Museum, LACMA West, Los Angeles, CA: Native American Artists of the 21st Century
- 2000 Cowboy Hall of Fame, Oklahoma City, OK: Winter Camp 2000: Honoring the Legacy

== Selected honors ==
Greeves' dedication to furthering Native American art has earned her many awards and honors. Greeves won Best of Show at the 1999 Santa Fe Indian Market and since has won awards from the Heard Museum, Indian Market, and Eight Northern Pueblos Arts and Crafts Show. She was awarded the Eric and Barbara Dobkin Fellowship from the School of American Research in 2003.

- 2007 Artist in Residence, University of Illinois at Urbana–Champaign
- 2003 Dobkin Fellowship Recipient, School of American Research, Santa Fe, NM
- 2003 Signature Artist, Heard Museum Fair, Phoenix, AZ
- 2002 Ornament Magazine, Cover. Spring 2002
