= Wendy Ponca =

Native American fashion designer

- Born: Kimberley Ann Ponca; 1960 (age 65–66); Texas
- Citizenship: Osage Nation and American
- Style: Osage art, Native American fashion
- Movement: Native Uprising collective, Indigenous Futurism
- Website: wendyponca.com

Wendy Ponca (born 1960) is an Osage artist, educator, and fashion designer noted for her Native American fashion creations. From 1982 to 1993, she taught design and Fiber Arts courses at the Institute of American Indian Arts (IAIA) of Santa Fe and later taught at the University of Las Vegas. She won first place awards for her contemporary Native American fashion from the Santa Fe Indian Market each year between 1982 and 1987. Her artwork is on display at IAIA, the Los Angeles County Museum of Art, the Philbrook Museum of Art and the Smithsonian Institution's National Museum of the American Indian.

== Early life ==
Kimberly Ann Ponca, known as Wendy, was born in 1960 in Texas to Barbara Ann (née Furr) and Carl Ponca. She grew up on the McDonald Observatory near Fort Davis, Texas. Her father, an Osage Nation artist and instructor who grew up on the Osage Reservation near Fairfax, Oklahoma met her mother, an interior designer, while they were attending the Kansas City Institute of Technology and Design. After completing her primary education, she attended Ft. Davis Central High School, before beginning her art studies at the Institute of American Indian Arts (IAIA) in Santa Fe, New Mexico. She studied the course "Traditional Techniques" under Sandy Fife Wilson, who had replaced the course creator Josephine Wapp (Comanche/Sac & Fox), who had recently retired. In 1977, as part of a community outreach program, the IAIA's fashion show was presented to the Chamber of Commerce of Santa Fe's Women's Division with Ponca as the emcee. After completing her education at IAIA in 1977, she studied art in New York and weaving in Greece. Ponca went on to study at the Kansas City Art Institute, where she earned her bachelor's degree in 1982 in Fiber arts and then she completed a master's degree in art therapy at Southwestern College of Santa Fe.

== Career ==
After completing her bachelor's degree, Ponca went to work as a costume designer at the Santa Fe Opera in 1982. Around the same time, she founded Waves of the Earth Fashion Group to market her fashion designs. At the end of the opera season, she was hired as Wilson's replacement for the "Traditional Techniques" course at IAIA. She also taught courses in Fashion Design, where she was known for her stress on patternmaking, tailoring and monitoring the structural integrity of the garments. In 1987, the "Traditional Techniques" course was renamed as Fiber Arts, facilitating credit transfers to other universities. It incorporated the use of Native American media, like beadwork and weaving techniques, as well as fiber manipulation, dyeing and design for both two- and three-dimensional works. Ponca and her students put on fashion shows under the Waves of the Earth banner to give the students exposure to marketing their wares. They also participated in Southwestern Association for Indian Arts's annual Santa Fe Indian Market (SWAIA Market) fashion show which featured garments designed by IAIA students.

As a designer, Ponca chose to show her work in fashion shows rather than in gallery settings, because gallery owners wanted stereotypical Native garments and were more adverse to the incorporation of outside influences. Showing her works at the Santa Fe Indian Market, Ponca earned first place ribbons for contemporary design each year between 1982 and 1987. After participating in the SWAIA Market for seven years, she decided to try other venues to diversify her exposure. In the mid-1980s, she co-founded Native Influx, which was later renamed as Native Uprising. The collective allowed artists, designers, and models to share in creating and profiting from their shows. It was the first organization of cooperation between Native American artists and founding members included Marcus Amerman (Choctaw), RoseMary Diaz (Santa Clara Tewa), Jackie Kee, Patricia Michaels (Taos Pueblo), Char Romero, and Carol Sandoval. Lloyd Kiva New (Cherokee Nation) served as an advisor and supported the group, whose focus was on creating a platform for Native Americans to compete in the fashion industry while marrying innovative new design with American Indian customary symbols and cultural practices.

In two-dimensional art, Ponca's works in the 1980s and 1990s utilized an eclectic mix of materials such as abalone shell, antlers, buckskin, felt, metal and other materials to create collages. She also made blankets, shawls and wall hangings and while her works incorporated Pan-Indian themes and those from various non-Native cultures, she also produced more culturally significant items highlighting Osage themes. In the 1990s, she incorporated Mylar, a polyester film first used in space travel, into her fashion designs. Its draping qualities, the sound it made when a model walked, and its symbolic relationship to the sky fit her fashion collection that reflected the Sky and Earth moieties of Osage people. She also experimented with body painting for her models inspired by historic Osage tattooing practices. The body paintings often represented Osage iconography like spiders and snakes, as well as floral or ribbonwork patterns.

Ponca left IAIA in 1993 and within two years, the school ceased offering its fashion program. She continued participating in high fashion events, such as the Indian Chic: An American Indian Fashion Show hosted by the Denver Art Museum in 1998, as well as Culture Embodied and Culture Embodied II, for which she also directed for IAIA in 2000. Culture Embodied was held in Albuquerque and the second show corresponded with the annual Santa Fe Indian Market.

In 1995, Ponca was commissioned to create four blankets by Pendleton Woolen Mills for a special edition series. The blankets were featured at an exhibition hosted by the American Textile History Museum in 2000. After a stint teaching at the University of Las Vegas, Ponca moved to Fairfax, Oklahoma, and has continued to design and exhibit her creations. She has served as the Director of Development for Tulsa's National Indian Monument Institute. Ponca's collection Wedding Clothes of the Earth and Sky People was exhibited at the Osage Tribal Museum in 2013. In 2016, Pendleton released another limited edition blanket designed by Ponca with the proceeds designated to benefit the Osage Nation Foundation. That same year, she exhibited at Philbrook Museum in the Native Fashion Now showing, which was created by the Peabody Essex Museum and toured the country before being exhibited at the National Museum of the American Indian of the Smithsonian Institution. Ponca has works displayed at IAIA, the Los Angeles County Museum of Art, the Philbrook Museum of Art, and the National Museum of the American Indian.
