= Ankopaaingyadete =

Kiowa artist and historian

Ankopaaingyadete (Anko)
- Àunkóp’àuiñgyàdé:dè
- Died: early 1900s
- Known for: Winter count

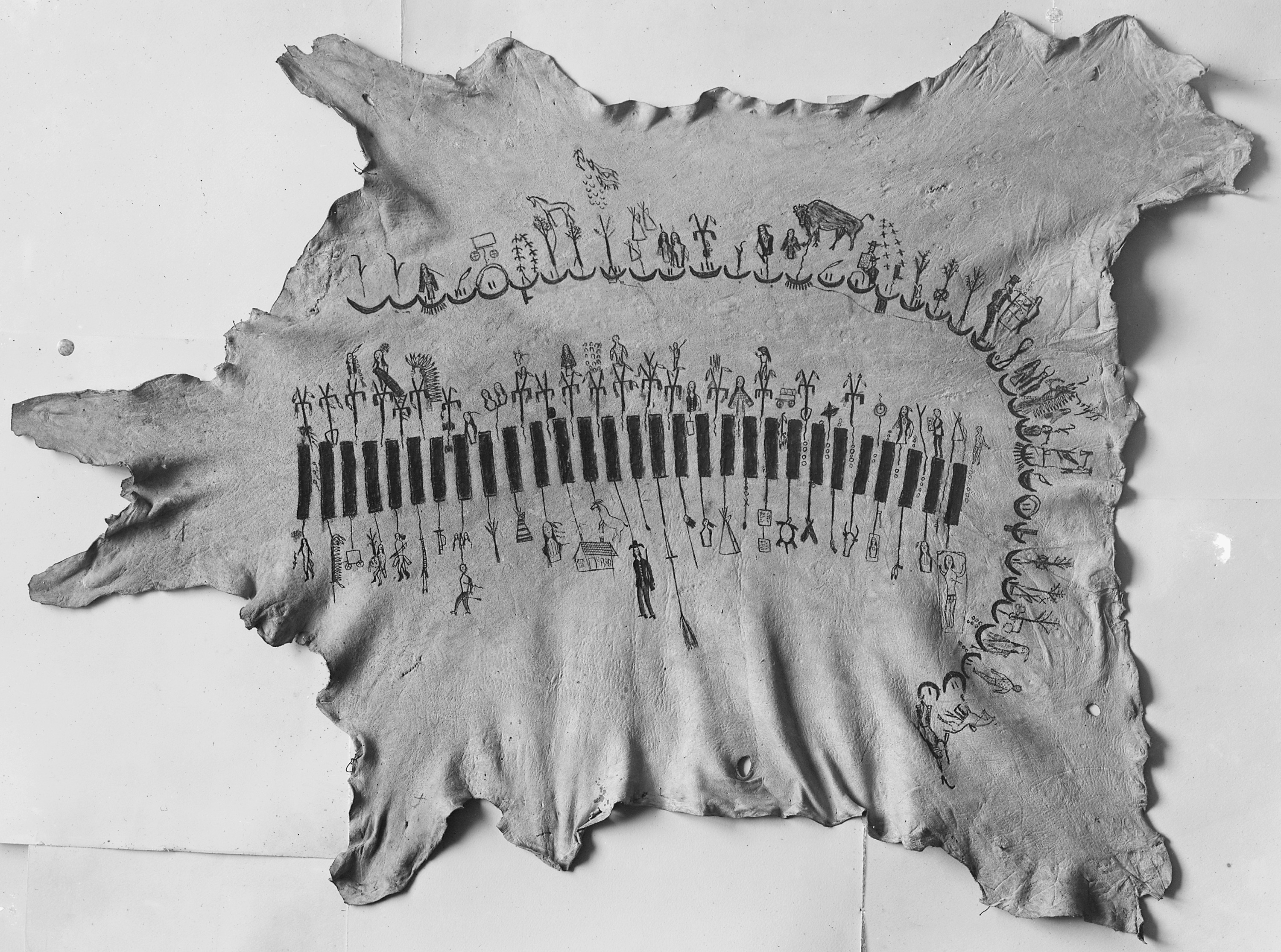
Kiowa winter count by Anko, covers summers and winters for 37 months, 1889–92, ca. 1895.

Ankopaaingyadete (Kiowa: Àunkóp’àuiñgyàdé:dè)(d. early 1900s), commonly called Anko or In The Middle Of Many Tracks, was a Kiowa artist and historian known for his pictographic winter count calendars. A seasonal calendar, originally created on brown wrapping paper, covered the time from winter 1863 to spring 1885. Another, a monthly record made with pencil in a ledger notebook, shows 39 months in the late 1880s and early 1890s.

Anko made several copies of his calendars on buckskin, including one with colored inks for ethnologist James Mooney. On this copy for Mooney, Anko combined his yearly and monthly calendars onto one piece. The original monthly calendar was depicted in blank ink in a continuous spiral. On the original and in the copies, the months are marked with crescent moons, symbols representing each moon's name (such as "Geese-going Moon" for October). Many of the events Anko recorded at this time chronicle the illness of his young wife, who was home with tuberculosis. One of these buckskin calendars was originally in the permanent collection of the Smithsonian, but has been lost. A 1965 copy of Anko's calendar, made by Kiowa artist Charles Rowell, is held at the Smithsonian National Museum of Natural History.
