= Dickson D. Bruce =

American historian (1946–2014)

- Born: Dickson Davies Bruce Jr. April 11, 1946; Dallas, Texas, U.S.
- Died: November 24, 2014 (aged 68)
- Education: University of Texas at Austin; University of Pennsylvania
- Occupations: History professor; author

Dickson "Dave" Davies Bruce Jr. (April 11, 1946 – November 24, 2014) was a history professor and author in the United States whose research focused on cultural and intellectual history of African Americans. He taught at the University of California, Irvine. He received the James Mooney Award from the Southern Anthropological Society in 1973 for his book And They All Sang Hallelujah.

Bruce was born in Dallas and raised in Lubbock, Texas. He received a bachelor's degree in from the University of Texas at Austin in 1967 and a doctorate from the University of Pennsylvania in 1971. He joined the faculty at UC Irvine in the same year and taught there for more than 35 years before retiring in 2008 as Professor of History. During his career, he served as Associate Dean of Graduate Studies, and Director of the Program in Comparative Cultures.

== Select writings ==
- And They All Sang Hallelujah: Plain-Folk Camp-Meeting Religion, 1800-1845 (1974)
- The "John and Old Master" Stories and the World of Slavery: A Study in Folktales and History (1974)
- Violence and Culture in the Antebellum South (1979)
- The Rhetoric of Conservatism: The Virginia Convention of 1829-30 and the Conservative Tradition in the South (1982)
- Black American Writing from the Nadir: The Evolution of a Literary Tradition, 1877-1915 (1989)
- Archibald Grimke: Portrait of a Black Independent (1993)
- The Origins of African American Literature, 1680-1865 (2001).
- The Kentucky Tragedy: A story of Conflict and Change in Antebellum America (2006)
