= Keri Ataumbi =

Kiowa jeweler, painter, and sculptor (born 1971)

- Born: Keri Sue Greeves; 1971 (age 54–55)
- Other names: Keri Sue Ataumbi
- Citizenship: American
- Occupations: jewelry artist, painter, sculptor
- Years active: 1990–present
- Mother: Jeri Ah-be-hill
- Relatives: Teri Greeves (sister)

Keri Ataumbi (born 1971) is a Kiowa artist who paints and sculpts but is most known as a jewelry maker. Her works have been featured in exhibits and permanent collections of various museums, including the Heard Museum, Minneapolis Institute of Art, Peabody Essex Museum, Philbrook Museum of Art, and the Smithsonian National Museum of the American Indian. In 2015, she and her sister, Teri Greeves, were honored as Living Treasures by the Museum of Indian Arts and Culture in Santa Fe, New Mexico.

== Early life and education ==
Keri Sue Greeves was born in 1971 on the Wind River Indian Reservation in Lander, Wyoming to Jeri Ah-be-hill and Richard V. Greeves. Her father was an artist and sculptor of Italian-American heritage. Her mother, a member of the Kiowa Tribe of Oklahoma with Comanche heritage, ran the trading post at Fort Washakie for nearly thirty years. She and her older sister, Teri grew up on the Eastern Shoshone, rather than the Northern Arapaho part of Wind River Reservation and were strongly influenced by their parents. As a child, Keri watched her father pour metal in his forge for his sculpture and was fascinated by his foundry. She learned both rebellion and an appreciation for the technical skill required for art from her father. She later said that she and her sister "owe our careers to him". She also saw her mother market Native American goods to reach a wider audience and learned to identify the characteristics of quality work. She credits her mother with teaching her to celebrate her Kiowa heritage through her individual expression.

Homeschooled until high school, Ataumbi graduated from The Cambridge School of Weston, near Boston. Then, at the suggestion of her art teacher, Todd Bartel, she enrolled in the Rhode Island School of Design. After a year in 1990, Greeves decided to leave school and move to Santa Fe, New Mexico, where her mother had relocated. That year, she legally changed her name to Keri Sue Ataumbi, appending the surname of her grandmother Carrie Susie Ataumbi, after whom she had been named. She briefly worked in retail before opening a landscaping business with a friend. Simultaneously, she began showing and selling paintings in several art galleries. When her business partner decided to go to medical school, they dissolved the partnership, and Ataumbi also returned to school. She enrolled at the Institute of American Indian Arts to improve her painting skill and after earning an associate degree in 1996, went on to further her education at the College of Santa Fe, now the Santa Fe University of Art and Design, graduating magna cum laude with a bachelor's degree in painting, having minored in Art History. She was strongly influenced by her instructor, Linda Swanson, who taught her to find her own vision and face critique of her work. After graduating, Ataumbi decided to pursue a master's degree and enrolled at the University of New Mexico. Within six months, she decided to leave, as she did not want to become a teacher and wanted to focus on her art. Taking a beginner's course in jewelry making at a local community college, Ataumbi found her niche in the art world and began producing jewelry.

== Career ==
Ataumbi's paintings are mixed-media abstracts that often focus on the opposing beauty and irony of her environment. For example, on a 2000 study trip to Indonesia, she worked on a series featuring a crumbling wall in Bali, rather than painting the island's lush surroundings. While she was in Bali, she studied casting techniques with Nyoman Partha to improve her fabrication skills. Her sculptural choices also challenge viewers' perceptions that she must use traditional and accepted Native icons and motifs to be a Native artist. One such sculpture, a Lucite table featuring cast iron legs from a mold of Ataumbi's arms, challenges the notion of stereotyping the work of Native artists; another, featuring 12" Pillsbury Doughboys, explores the parallels between iconic objects and the objectifying depiction of Native people in popular culture. Another piece, more traditional, which she created for the Heard Museum is a buckskin-lined silver handbag, decorated with gold and diamond stars to represent the Kiowa Big Dipper legend.

Ataumbi's jewelry work typically starts with a theme, and then she creates a series of related pieces. For example, in her Insect Series, pieces focused on bees, beetles, damsel flies, water bugs, and yellow jackets. She does not strictly produce pieces featuring native motifs, believing that contemporary native jewelry need not reflect stereotypical design. Instead, her pieces often explore the connections and disconnections of value systems. In indigenous cultures, items of value included elk teeth and feathers, whereas the broader culture focuses on metals and gems. Ataumbi utilizes materials from both cultural perspectives in her work. Though gold is one of her favorite mediums, she also works with silver and platinum, combining metals with gemstones, buffalo horn, buckskin or porcupine quills. Her approach is artistic; rather than meticulous attention to stone setting, she combines textures such as rose-cut and brilliant-cut diamonds for their artistic effect. She is interested in mixing materials that combine elements "we as indigenous people hold valuable (elk teeth, buffalo, feathers, etc.) with elements considered valuable in the popular culture (diamonds, high-carat gold, precious stones, etc.). There is a beauty that happens in combining different value systems through material that is inclusive.

One of her pieces, a mussel-shell necklace from her Ocean Collection, was featured in the touring exhibit, "Native Fashion Now", which highlighted the works of 75 Native American fashion designers from North America. The traveling exhibit premiered at the Peabody Essex Museum in Salem, Massachusetts in 2014 and then moved to other locations like the Philbrook Museum of Art in Tulsa, Oklahoma, the Portland Art Museum in Oregon before ending at the Smithsonian's National Museum of the American Indian in Manhattan in 2016. Ataumbi's Mommy's Collection is dedicated to reproducing some of the iconic pieces worn by her mother, who died in 2015. One of these was a silver ring originally marketed by Fred Harvey. Ataumbi's twist on the ring was to remake it in gold and set a small diamond on the underside. It and a pair of earrings designed by Ataumbi were worn by Melaw Nakehk'o at the premiere of The Revenant in 2015. Another piece from the Mommy's Series featured the painted likeness of her namesake and an interpretation of the clan fetish in the shape of a turtle Carrie Susie had made at Greeve's birth. The painting was combined with metalwork and won best in class in 2016 at the Santa Fe Indian Market.

In addition to her own series of work, Ataumbi has had several productive collaborative associations. In 2011, in conjunction with Robin Waynee (Saginaw Chippewa), they created an insect-themed earrings-ring-necklace set, which was donated to the gala auction to benefit the Southwestern Association for Indian Arts (SWAIA). In 2014, with beader Jamie Okuma (Luiseño/Shoshone-Bannock), Ataumbi worked on another earrings-ring-necklace set based on historic likenesses of Pocahontas. The mixed media set, which used beads, buckskin, diamonds, freshwater pearls, antique glass, gold, and indigenous wampum, was purchased for the permanent collection of the Minneapolis Institute of Art. In a second collaboration inspired by the sculpture For the Love of God by Damien Hirst, Ataumbi and Okuma created For the Love of Art, featuring a Marilyn Monroe ring and skull on a bracelet. Though she and her sister, Teri, a noted beadworker, normally do not collaborate in their work, the sisters jointly spoke about heritage and art at the Wheelwright Museum of the American Indian, after they were honored as Living Treasures by the Museum of Indian Arts and Culture of Santa Fe in 2015. The award, given by a division of the New Mexico Department of Cultural Affairs, recognized the sisters, individually and collectively, for their "museum-quality work", which incorporates a storytelling narrative of their cultural heritage.

Ataumbi has been an artist in residence at UCROSS two times. In 2024, Ataumbi did a week-long residency in North Carolina as part of her work being shown at the North Carolina Museum of Art in "To Take Shape and Meaning" and for a talk at the Ackland Museum of Art at the UNC.

In 2023, her work was featured on actor Lily Gladstone (Blackfeet), and in 2024 she was commissioned to work with designer Gabriella Hearst on Gladstone's look for the Met Gala. In addition to collaborating on the gown, Ataumbi made all of the accessories for the look, including earrings, a hair ornament, and rings.

== Selected Exhibits ==
Year	Exhibit	Host	Location(s)
2017	"From my studio: Feathers to Diamonds" (Solo)	Shiprock Santa Fe	Santa Fe, NM
2016–2017	"From the Belly of Our Being: Art by and about Native Creation"	Oklahoma State University	Stillwater, OK
2015–2017	"Native Fashion Now"	Peabody Essex Museum	Portland Art Museum, Philbrook Museum of Art, National Museum of American Indian
2008	"Ataumbi Metals" (Solo)	Fourwinds	Pittsburgh, NM
