= Southern Anthropological Society =

The Southern Anthropological Society (SAS) is an organization in the United States. It publishes a journal titled Southern Anthropologist and issues a newsletter. It awards a James Mooney Award (James Mooney) and Zora Neal Hurston Award (Zora Neal Hurston). The Mooney Award recognizes the best among books about southern anthropological matters.

The group was established in 1966. It holds an annual meeting. William E. Carter was involved in the group.

Robbie Ethridge and Dickson D. Bruce are among recipients of the Mooney award.

== Website ==
- Official website
