= Project Runway season 11 =

Project Runway
- Season 11
- No. of tasks: 12
- No. of contestants: 16
- Winner: Michelle Lesniak Franklin
- No. of episodes: 15

Release
- Original network: Lifetime
- Original release: January 24 – May 2, 2013

Season chronology
- ← Previous; Season 10 Next → Season 12

Project Runway Season 11 is the eleventh season of the television show Project Runway, appearing on Lifetime. The season began airing on January 24, 2013, with 16 designers competing to become "the next great American designer."

Supermodel Heidi Klum and Marie Claire fashion director Nina Garcia returned as judges this season. Tim Gunn returned as the workroom mentor. Zac Posen replaced Michael Kors as one of main judges due to scheduling conflicts with Kors.

Lord & Taylor was the exclusive retail sponsor for Project Runway's 11th season and has merchandised the accessory wall with an assortment of products.

In 2013, Daniel Esquivel competed in Project Runway All Stars (season 3), placing 10th of 11.

In 2014, Patricia Michaels, Kate Pankoke, Benjamin Mach, Samantha Black and Michelle Lesniak competed in Project Runway All Stars (season 4), with Patricia placing 14th, Kate placing 11th, Benjamin placing 10th, Samantha placing 8th, and Michelle placing 4th.

In 2016, Layana Aguilar competed in Project Runway All Stars (season 5), placing 7th of 13.

In 2018, Amanda Valentine and Stanley Hudson competed in Project Runway All Stars (season 6), with Amanda placing 11th and Stanley being the runner-up.

In 2019, Michelle Lesniak returned for a third time to compete in Project Runway All Stars (season 7) against worldwide Project Runway winners. She won the competition.

== Contestants ==
Contestant	Age	Hometown	Finish	Outcome
Emily Pollard	24	Richfield, Ohio	Episode 1	16th place
James Martinez	29	Dallas, Texas	Episode 2	15th place
Cindy Marlatt	59	Kent, Washington	Episode 3	14th place
Joseph Aaron Segal	30	Framingham, Massachusetts	Episode 4	13th place
Matthew Arthur	30	Hammond, Louisiana	Episode 5	12th place
Benjamin Mach	35	Sydney, Australia	Episode 6	11th place
Tu Suthiwat Nakchat	26	Chachoengsao, Thailand	Episode 7	9th place
Kate Pankoke	23	Eau Claire, Wisconsin	Episode 7	9th place
Amanda Valentine	31	Lincoln, Nebraska	Episode 8	8th place
Samantha Black	28	Bronx, New York	Episode 9	7th place
Richard Hallmarq	39	Sacramento, California	Episode 10	6th place
Layana Aguilar	28	Governador Valadares, Brazil	Episode 12	5th place
Daniel Esquivel	49	Dallas, Texas	Episode 13	4th place
Stanley Hudson	45	Lynwood, California	Episode 14	3rd place
Patricia Michaels	46	Taos, New Mexico	Episode 14	Runner-up
Michelle Lesniak Franklin	34	Portland, Oregon	Episode 14	Winner

=== Models ===
- Lisa Jackson
- Katrina Topacio
- Anna Kanehara
- Marina Tarakhovich
- Blaga Slaveykova
- Liza Lyadova
- Catherine Gray
- Gina DeNezzo
- Kayla Mayhew
- Aisha Elizabeth
- Kayla Miller
- Eloho Erhieyovwe
- Brandi Vicks
- Carolyna Ramos
- Bianca Alexander
- Megan Cassidy

=== Teams ===
Designer	Original team	Challenge 4 team	Challenge 5,6 partners	Challenge 7 partners	Challenge 8 teams	Challenge 9 partners	Challenge 10 partners	Challenge 11 assistants	Challenge 12 assistants	Challenge 13 assistants	Result
Michelle	Dream Team	Keeping it Real	Matthew	Amanda	Shades of Grey	Daniel	Stanley	Amanda	Tu	Amanda	Winner
Patricia	Keeping it Real	Keeping it Real	Layana	Samantha	Shades of Grey	Stanley	Richard	Richard	Kate	Layana	Runner-Up
Stanley	Keeping it Real	Dream Team	Richard	Layana	Shades of Grey	Patricia	Michelle	Tu	Richard	Richard	2nd Runner-up
Daniel	Keeping it Real	Keeping it Real	Samantha	Richard	Shades of Grey	Michelle	Layana	Samantha	Amanda	Samantha	Eliminated in Challenge 13
Layana	Keeping it Real	Dream Team	Patricia	Stanley	Slick and Hip	Richard & Samantha	Daniel	Kate	Samantha		Eliminated in Challenge 12
Richard	Keeping it Real	Keeping it Real	Stanley	Daniel	Slick and Hip	Layana & Samantha	Patricia				Eliminated in Challenge 10
Samantha	Dream Team	Dream Team	Daniel	Patricia	Slick and Hip	Layana & Richard					Eliminated in Challenge 9
Amanda	Keeping it Real	Keeping it Real	Benjamin	Michelle	Slick and Hip						Eliminated in Challenge 8
Kate	Keeping it Real	Keeping it Real	Tu	Tu							Eliminated in Challenge 7
Tu	Dream Team	Dream Team	Kate	Kate							Eliminated in Challenge 7
Benjamin	Dream Team	Dream Team	Amanda								Eliminated in Challenge 6
Matthew	Dream Team	Dream Team	Michelle								Eliminated in Challenge 5
Joseph	Keeping it Real	Keeping it Real									Eliminated in Challenge 4
Cindy	Dream Team										Eliminated in Challenge 3
James	Dream Team										Eliminated in Challenge 2
Emily	Dream Team										Eliminated in Challenge 1

== Season 11 challenges ==
Designer elimination table
Designers	1	2	3^{1}	4^{2}	5	6^{3}	7	8^{4}	9	10	11^{5}	12	13	14	Eliminated episode
Michelle	IN	IN	IN	IN	LOW	IN	WIN	IN	WIN	HIGH	LOW	HIGH	ADV	WINNER	14 – Finale, Part 2
Patricia	HIGH	IN	HIGH	IN	IN	IN	HIGH	IN	IN	LOW	LOW	LOW	ADV	RUNNER-UP	14 – Finale, Part 2
Stanley	IN	HIGH	IN	IN	HIGH	WIN	IN	IN	IN	WIN	WIN	WIN	ADV	3RD PLACE	14 – Finale, Part 2
Daniel	WIN	HIGH	WIN	IN	LOW	HIGH	LOW	IN	HIGH	HIGH	LOW	HIGH	OUT		13 – Finale: Part 1
Layana	IN	WIN	HIGH	HIGH	IN	IN	IN	LOW	LOW	LOW	HIGH	OUT			12 – Europe, Here We Come
Richard	HIGH	HIGH	IN	IN	WIN	HIGH	LOW	LOW	LOW	OUT					10 – The Art of Fashion
Samantha	IN	IN	IN	WIN	LOW^{6}	HIGH	HIGH	LOW	OUT						9 – He Said, She Said
Amanda	IN	IN	IN	LOW	HIGH	LOW	HIGH	OUT							8 – Take It All Off!
Kate	IN	IN	WIN	IN	IN	LOW	OUT								7 – A Sticky Situation
Tu	IN	IN	IN	IN	IN	LOW	OUT								7 – A Sticky Situation
Benjamin	IN	LOW	LOW	HIGH	HIGH	OUT									6 – Senior Fling
Matthew	IN	LOW	LOW	HIGH	OUT										5 – A Little Bit Country, A Little Bit Rock N Roll
Joseph	IN	HIGH	IN	OUT											4 – The Ultimate Hard and Soft
Cindy	LOW	LOW	OUT												3 – Surprise Me
James	LOW	OUT													2 – Spin Out
Emily	OUT														1 – There is No 'I' in Team

- Scores are based on the Project Runway Website
- ^Note 1: Before beginning the critique for Team Keeping it Real, Heidi Klum stated that she extremely disliked Richard's outfit and, had his team lost, he could've been in the bottom and/or out. Heidi also stated she did not like Stanley's dress at all and he also could've been in the bottom and/or out had Team Keeping it Real lost, and that they should be very grateful that their teammates were successful.
- ^Note 2: Although Dream Team was named the winning team, Team Keeping It Real, despite their lack of cohesion, was also declared strong, and Heidi referred to them as the "almost-winning team", as opposed to being the losing team.
- ^Note 3: Before allowing Patricia, Michelle, and Layana to leave the runway, Heidi stated that she gave Layana and Michelle the highest scores out of all the designers and would've been in the top had Patricia not scored very low. The judges also expressed that Kate would not have been in the bottom had Tu done better.
- ^Note 4: Heidi and the judges declared in judging that due to the low scores in all the garments, there would be no winner of the challenge, a Project Runway first.
- ^Note 5: Patricia and Michelle were left on the runway as the bottom two in this episode. After Heidi told Patricia that she was in, Michelle was the only one left. Though she lost the challenge, Heidi told her that she had a "do or die" moment, and would be given a second chance, much to the shock of her and her fellow remaining designers. It was revealed in the next episode that she was still in the competition but would not be traveling to Europe like the other remaining designers.
- ^Note 6:Although Samantha had one of the lowest scores for the challenge, she was automatically safe as she had immunity

Limegreen background and WINNER means the designer won Project Runway Season 11.
Teal background and ADV means the designer was advanced to Fashion Week.
Blue background and WIN means the designer won that challenge.
Turquoise background and HIGH means the designer had the second highest score for that challenge.
Light blue background and HIGH means the designer had one of the highest scores for that challenge.
Pink background and LOW means the designers had one of the lowest scores for that challenge.
Orange background and LOW means the designer was in the bottom two or three (as in episode 5).
Red background and OUT means the designer lost and was out of the competition.

Model Elimination Table
Model	1	2	3	4	5	6	7	8	9	10	11	12	13	14
Lisa	PM	–	PM	PM	PM	–	PM,SB	–	MF	MF	MF	MF	MF	WINNER (MF)
Katrina	SH	–	SH	SH	SH	–	LA,SH	–	PM	PM	PM	PM	PM	PM
Anna	AV	–	KP,LA	SB	SB	–	–	–	SH	SH	SH	SH	SH	SH
Marina	DE	DE,LA	DE	DE	DE	–	–	–	DE	DE	DE	DE	DE	OUT
Blaga	LA	AV	–	MF,RH	RH	–	DE,RH	–	LA	LA	LA	LA	OUT	
Liza	BM	–	BM	AV	AV	–	–	–	RH	RH	OUT			
Catherine	TN	MF	TN	–	MF	–	AV,MF	–	SB	OUT				
Aisha	RH	–	–	LA	LA	–	–	–	OUT					
Eloho	KP	KP,PM	RH	TN	TN	–	–	–	OUT					
Gina	CM	BM,CM	CM	KP	KP	–	KP,TN	–	OUT					
Kayla Ma.	MA	–	MA	BM	BM	–	OUT							
Kayla Mi.	SB	–	SB	MA	MA	–	OUT							
Brandi	MF	SB,TN	MF	JS	OUT									
Carolyna	JS	–	AV,JS	OUT										
Bianca	JM	–	OUT											
Megan	EP	–	OUT											

The model won Project Runway Season 11.
The model wore the winning design.
The model wore the design with the second-highest score, or was in the winning team but did not win.
The model wore the design with one of the highest scores but did not win.
The model wore the design with one of the lowest scores.
The model wore the design that landed in the bottom 2.
The model wore the losing design.
The model was eliminated.

- In episode 2, male models were used in the challenge with the models.
- In episode 6 and 8, the models were not needed in the challenge.

Designer Legend

- Amanda Valentine: AV
- Benjamin Mach: BM
- Cindy Marlatt: CM
- Daniel Esquivel: DE
- Emily Pollard: EP
- James Martinez: JM
- Joseph Aaron Segal: JS
- Kate Pankoke: KP
- Layana Aguilar: LA
- Matthew Arthur: MA
- Michelle Lesniak Franklin: MF
- Patricia Michaels: PM
- Richard Hallmarq: RH
- Samantha Black: SB
- Stanley Hudson: SH
- Tu Suthiwat Nakchat: TN

== Episodes ==
=== Episode 1: There is No 'I' in Team ===
Original airdate: January 24, 2013

- Season 11 returns with a twist that throws 16 eager new designers into a panic when they discover they will be participating in the series first-ever "Teams Edition." In the premiere episode, the designers will have New York as their inspiration in creating their garments.
- Judges: Heidi Klum, Nina Garcia, Zac Posen
- Guest Judge: Christian Siriano
- WINNER: Daniel (Keeping It Real)
- ELIMINATED: Emily (Dream Team)

=== Episode 2: Spin Out ===
Original airdate: January 31, 2013

- The designers serve up ball-boy outfits and new server uniforms for a Ping-Pong social club.
- Judges: Heidi Klum, Nina Garcia, Zac Posen
- Guest Judge: Susan Sarandon
- WINNER: Layana (Keeping It Real)
- ELIMINATED: James (Dream Team)

=== Episode 3: Surprise Me ===
Original airdate: February 7, 2013

- The contestants are tasked to design garments for host Heidi Klum for the launch of her new fragrance line. Heidi will wear the winning garments in her national commercial and a second winning garment for a press event.
- Judges: Heidi Klum, Nina Garcia, Zac Posen
- Guest Judge: Kristin Davis
- WINNER: Kate (Keeping It Real) & Daniel (Keeping It Real)
- ELIMINATED: Cindy (Dream Team)

=== Episode 4: The Ultimate Hard and Soft ===
Original airdate: February 14, 2013

- While the teams get a twist, the designers also get a blast from the past when two unconventional challenges are merged into one for their newest challenge—creating a line out of hard and soft materials from the flower shop and hardware store.
- Judges: Heidi Klum, Nina Garcia, Zac Posen
- Guest Judge: Bette Midler & Leandra Medine
- WINNER: Samantha (Dream Team)
- ELIMINATED: Joseph (Keeping It Real)

=== Episode 5: A Little Bit Country, A Little Bit Rock N Roll ===
Original airdate: February 21, 2013

- The designers are separated into teams of two to create a performance outfit and a red-carpet look for country artist Miranda Lambert, who is also the guest judge.

Team	Performance Outfit	The Red-Carpet Look
1	Samantha	Daniel
2	Richard	Stanley
3	Matthew	Michelle
4	Amanda	Benjamin
5	Patricia	Layana
6	Tu	Kate

- Judges: Heidi Klum, Nina Garcia, Zac Posen
- Guest Judge: Miranda Lambert
- WINNER: Richard (Partner – Stanley)
- ELIMINATED: Matthew (Partner – Michelle)

=== Episode 6: Senior Fling ===
Original airdate: February 28, 2013

- Fashionable clothes for senior citizens are created by the contestants
- Judges: Heidi Klum, Nina Garcia
- Guest Judge: Rachel Roy (sitting in for Zac Posen) & Joan Rivers & Melissa Rivers
- WINNER: Stanley (Partner – Richard)
- ELIMINATED: Benjamin (Partner – Amanda)

=== Episode 7: A Sticky Situation ===
Original airdate: March 7, 2013

- The contestants design fashion-forward prom looks constructed from duct tape.
- Judges: Heidi Klum, Nina Garcia, Zac Posen
- Guest Judge: Chris Benz
- WINNER: Michelle (Partner – Amanda)
- ELIMINATED: Kate (Partner – Tu) & Tu (Partner – Kate)

=== Episode 8: Take It All Off! ===
Original airdate: March 14, 2013

- The contestants design outfits for the male revue Australia's Thunder from Down Under
- Judges: Heidi Klum, Nina Garcia, Zac Posen
- Guest Judge: Emmy Rossum
- WINNER: None
- ELIMINATED: Amanda (Slick And Hip)

=== Episode 9: He Said, She Said ===
Original airdate: March 21, 2013

- For this episode, the designers are instructed to draw inspiration from Lord & Taylor's signature "American Beauty Rose" and create a design with the retailer's customer in mind.
- Judges: Heidi Klum, Nina Garcia
- Guest Judge: Rachel Roy (sitting in for Zac Posen) & Bonnie Brooks
- WINNER: Michelle (Partner – Daniel)
- ELIMINATED: Samantha (Partners – Layana & Richard)

=== Episode 10: The Art of Fashion ===
Original airdate: March 28, 2013

- The designers will go to the Solomon R. Guggenheim Museum and draw some inspiration from the artwork displayed to create their own textile designs for their outfit. The winning designer was also awarded $10,000 and an HP Envy X2.
- Judges: Heidi Klum, Nina Garcia
- Guest Judge: Rachel Roy (sitting in for Zac Posen) & Tracy Reese
- WINNER: Stanley (Partner – Michelle)
- ELIMINATED: Richard (Partner – Patricia)

=== Episode 11: Finally on My Own ===
Original airdate: April 4, 2013

- The designers get the chance to show off their own aesthetic when they create editorial-worthy looks to be worn by actress Jordana Brewster in Marie Claire. At elimination Patricia and Michelle landed in the bottom two. Heidi said that they were giving Patricia another chance, making it appear that Michelle was being eliminated. However, Heidi told Michelle that she was getting another chance. Michelle must prove herself as the episode ends with uncertainty as to whether or not there will be an elimination.
- Judges: Heidi Klum, Nina Garcia, Zac Posen
- Guest Judge: Jordana Brewster
- WINNER: Stanley (Assistant – Tu)
- ELIMINATED: None

=== Episode 12: Europe, Here We Come ===
Original airdate: April 11, 2013

- The designers travel to Berlin, Barcelona, London and Paris to get inspiration for the final challenge before the finale. Michelle was given a second chance to stay in the competition in this episode, but would draw inspiration from New York City, rather than travelling to Europe with the other designers.
- Judges: Heidi Klum, Nina Garcia, Zac Posen
- Guest Judge: John Legend
- WINNER: Stanley
- ELIMINATED: Layana (Assistant – Samantha)

=== Episode 13: Finale: Part 1 ===
Original airdate: April 18, 2013

- The finalists work on their collections; Tim Gunn visits each of the finalists in their hometown.
- Judges: Heidi Klum, Nina Garcia, Zac Posen
- Guest Judge: None
- ADVANCED TO FASHION WEEK: Michelle, Patricia, Stanley
- ELIMINATED: Daniel

=== Episode 14: Finale: Part 2 ===
Original airdate: April 25, 2013

- The designers show their collections in the final runway show at Lincoln Center.
- Judges: Heidi Klum, Nina Garcia, Zac Posen
- Guest Judge: Michael Kors
- WINNER: Michelle
- ELIMINATED: Stanley & Patricia

=== Episode 15: Reunion Special ===
Original airdate: May 2, 2013

- After the Finale, the designers reunite to discuss their journey on Project Runway.

== Trivia ==
- Amanda Valentine is a younger sister of guitarist James Valentine of Maroon 5
- Lisa Jackson, the winning model, also appeared in America's Next Top Model.
