= Jeri Ah-be-hill =

Kiowa fashion expert and art dealer (1933–2015)

- Born: Geraldine Fuller; September 23, 1933; Apache, Oklahoma
- Died: March 11, 2015 (aged 81); Santa Fe, New Mexico
- Other names: Jeri Greeves, Jeri Fuller Ahbe-hill
- Citizenship: Kiowa Tribe of Oklahoma and U.S.
- Occupations: businesswoman, Native American apparel collector, docent, and curator
- Years active: 1965–2015
- Children: Teri Greeves; Keri Ataumbi

Jeri Ah-be-hill (September 23, 1933 – March 11, 2015) was a Kiowa fashion expert and art dealer. She owned and operated a trading post on the Wind River Indian Reservation for more than 20 years before moving to Santa Fe, New Mexico, where she became the curator of the annual Native American Clothing Contest held at the Santa Fe Indian Market. She also worked as a docent at both the Institute of American Indian Arts and the Wheelwright Museum of the American Indian. Considered an expert on Native American fashion, she traveled nationally presenting educational information about tribal clothing.

== Early life ==
Geraldine Fuller was born on September 23, 1933 (Note: Several published sources give her birth year as 1934; however, given that she was born in September and appears on the 1934 Kiowa-Comanche Census which was taken April 1, 1934, the date on the census appears to be more accurate.) in Apache, Oklahoma to Sarah (née Ataumbi) and Earl Fuller. Her mother was a member of the Kiowa Tribe of Oklahoma, and her father was a member of the Comanche Nation. She was a great-niece of the noted Kiowa artist Silver Horn. Fuller studied at Riverside Indian School in Anadarko, becoming involved in Native American apparel when she was asked to model in 1951 at the fashion show of the Peoria, Illinois Indian Arts and Crafts Association. From the age of twenty-one, she wore nothing but American Indian-inspired clothing. She attended courses at the University of Oklahoma in the early 1950s, before moving to St. Louis, Missouri, where she worked at McQuay-Norris. In 1954, Fuller married Richard Greeves, an artist and the couple moved to Fort Washakie, Wyoming, where Jeri set up a studio on the Wind River Indian Reservation. They had their two daughters Teri (born 1970) and Keri (born 1971), who would both become noted Native American artists.

== Career ==
In 1965, Fuller established a gallery and trading post for American Indian arts and crafts. She also began collecting Native American apparel. Though it was unusual for an American Indian woman to operate a business at that time, Fuller had wanted to find ways to help Native artists promote their work since she was a child. Many of the works she carried featured the beadwork of the nearby Arapaho and Shoshone artists, but she carried a wide variety of arts and crafts made by diverse indigenous Americans. She began giving fashion shows to showcase various examples of tribal dress. She operated the trading post until her divorce in 1988 and then relocated to Santa Fe, New Mexico.

Fuller volunteered at the Indigenous Language Institute and worked at both the Institute of American Indian Arts and the Wheelwright Museum of the American Indian, as a docent. In 1990, she legally changed her name to Jeri Ah-be-hill and began working at Arrowsmith's Gallery, providing year-round fashion exhibitions. Ah-be-hill did not see herself as an artist, but rather someone who had gained knowledge from buying for many years and who could educate others about Native American dance regalia and historical clothing. In 1991, she was elected to the board of directors for the Southwestern Association for Indian Arts (SWAIA) and began directing the fashion show and contest for the Santa Fe Indian Market. Ah-be-hill was quick to point out the differences in Native fashions from more mainstream clothing. They were not "costumes", which she equated to dress-up games, but rather culturally significant clothing and often handmade in tribally specific styles. Over the years that she directed the fashion contest, she saw an increase in contemporary design, which was judged in a separate category. After seventeen years of directing the popular style show at the Santa Fe Indian Market, Ah-be-hill stepped aside as chair in 2008, but continued to serve as an event advisor.

Ah-Be-Hill co-wrote "As Long As I Can Thread a Needle: Southern Plains Beadworkers and Their Art" with Charles J. Lohrmann in Native Peoples magazine (Summer 1992).

When she was not involved with the Indian Market, Ah-be-hill traveled widely presenting educational talks on Native fashions both throughout the United States and internationally. She also curated events such as the Smithsonian Museum of Natural History traveling exhibit on Silver Horn, which toured the country in 1995 and included pieces from her collection of her great-uncle, Silver Horn's work. In 2010, she served as a Native representative for the Caen Festival of Normandy, France. In 2011, she was the recipient of the Povi’ka Award of the Santa Fe Indian Market in recognition of her leadership and support to Native American artists and communities.

== Death and legacy ==
Ah-be-hill died on March 11, 2015, in Santa Fe. Between 2014 and 2016, an exhibit held honoring Native American women artists, featured part of the collection of Jeri Ah-be-hill, and works by Margarete Bagshaw, and Josephine Myers-Wapp and were displayed at the Museum of Indian Arts and Culture (MIAC) in Santa Fe. The three were honored in 2016 by the MIAC for Women's History Month.
