= Winter count =

Pictorial histories created by native tribes in North America

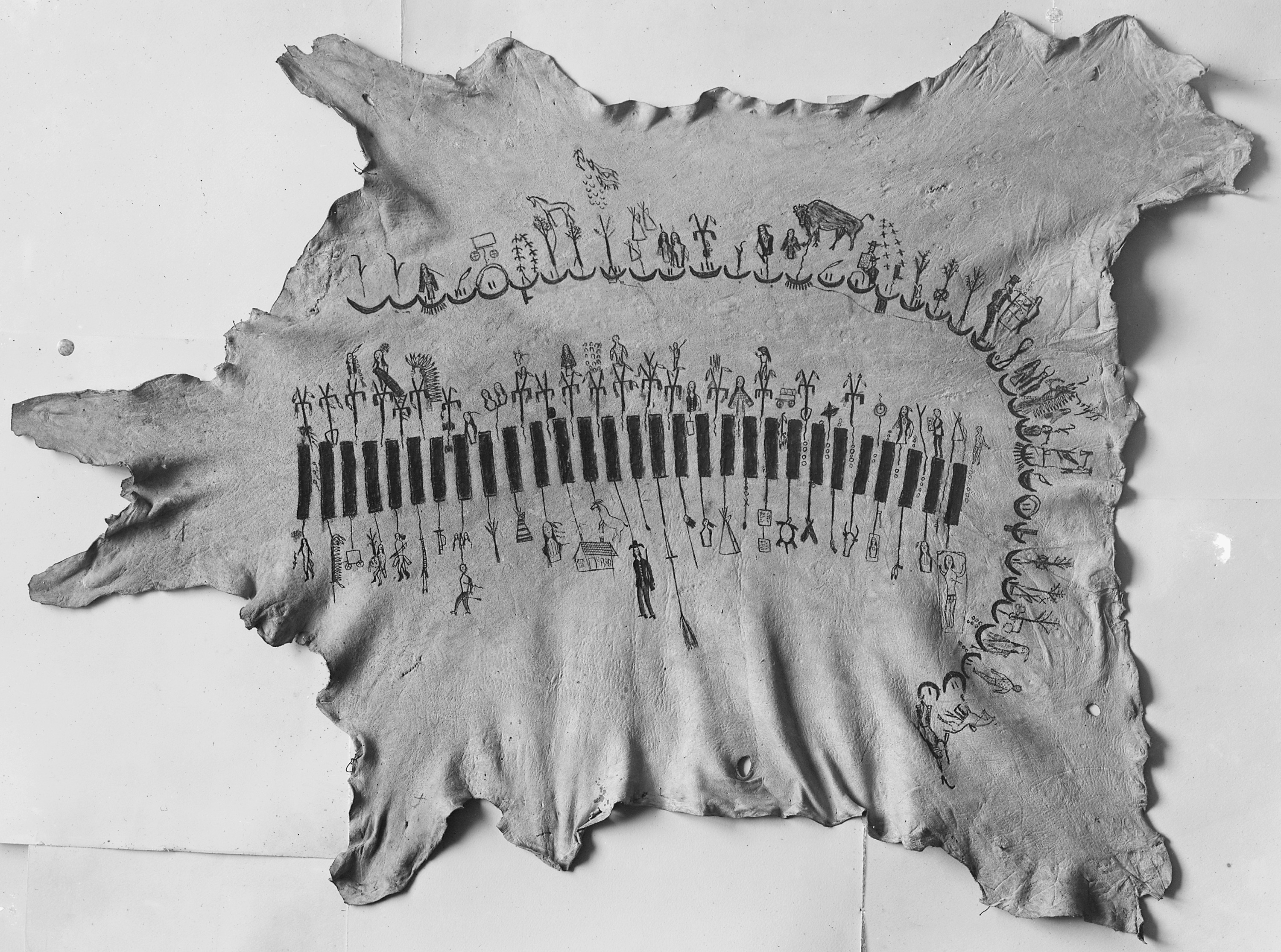
Kiowa winter count by Anko, covers summers and winters for 37 months, 1889–92, ca. 1895. National Archives and Records Administration

Winter counts (Lakota: waníyetu wówapi or waníyetu iyáwapi) are pictorial calendars or histories in which tribal records and events were recorded by Native Americans in North America. The Blackfeet, Mandan, Kiowa, Lakota, and other Plains tribes used winter counts extensively. There are approximately one hundred winter counts in existence, many of which are duplicates.

== Description ==
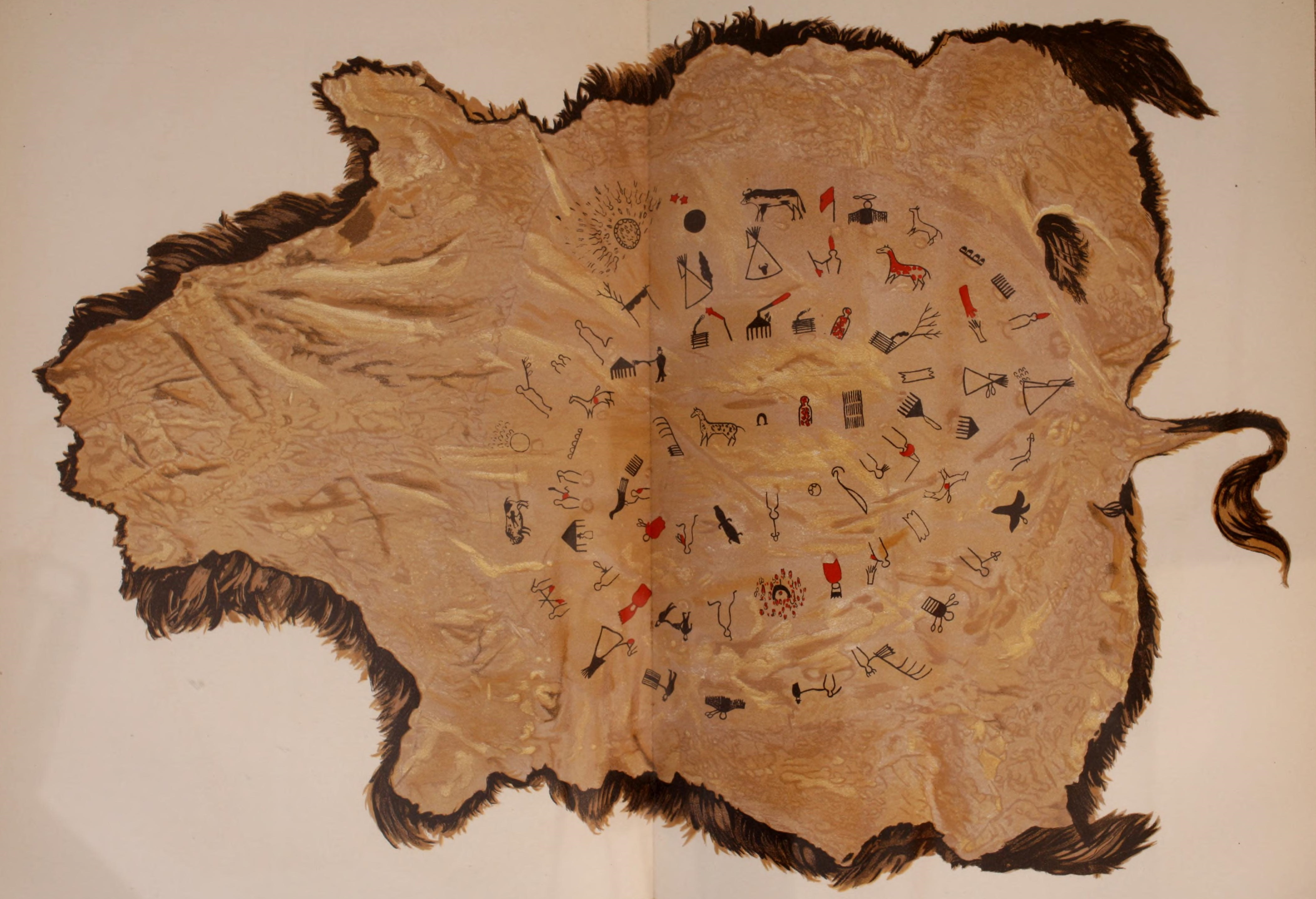
A copy of the winter count kept by Yanktonai Sioux Lone Dog

Winter counts are pictographic calendars, traditionally painted on bison hides, which display a sequence of years by depicting their most remarkable events. The term winter count itself comes from the Lakota name waniyetu wowapi, ‘waniyetu’ translating to ‘winter’ while ‘wowapi’ refers to “anything that is marked and can be read or counted.” Most winter counts have a single pictograph symbolizing each year, based on the most memorable event of that year. For Lakota people, years ran from first snowfall to first snowfall. Kiowa winter counts usually feature two marks per year – one for winter and one marking the summer Sun Dance. The glyphs representing significant events would be used as a reference that could be consulted regarding the order of the years.

Similar to other traditions among the Indigenous nations of North America, winter counts were used as mnemonic records in order to help structure fuller accounts of history that would be passed on orally. The Indigenous peoples of North America had many ways of recording history during the pre-contact period that did not depend on alphabetic writing. Without the practice of written records, oral tradition was an extremely important aspect of Indigenous lifeways and was the main way that knowledge was transmitted from generation to generation. Oftentimes, pictorial or other mnemonic devices were used as guide posts for these practices. This is significantly present in the Sioux cultural tradition of oral history preservation through the form of winter counts. Located in the Northern Great Plains, Dakota, Nakota, and Lakota people physically recorded yearly events on various materials before and continuing past the point of contact with settlers.

While winter counts reveal the year number when studied and compared to other sources, the similarities between some winter counts also demonstrate inter-band relations. As some bands in the Great Plains region had close ties through alliances, their winter counts could often be very similar. Scholars have noted that the Lone Dog, The Flame, The Swan, and Major Bush winter counts are so similar for this reason; because these bands lived close by and often interacted with each other.

Lakota winter counts particularly reveal deeply rooted historical ties with European traders during a period that predates the Lewis and Clark Expedition and the subsequent extreme marginalization and oppression of Indigenous peoples in North America. This demonstrates a type of communal history that indicates the relationship between bands as well as settlers, and their political and social dynamics. By the end of the 1870s to the early 1880s, copies of winter counts (including the American Horse, Cloud Shield, and Battiste Good) were being commissioned by European collectors as Indigenous ethnographic objects.

== Creation of winter counts ==
Traditionally each band would choose a single keeper of the winter count. Until the twentieth century, these keepers were always men. They would consult with tribal elders to reach a consensus for choosing a name for the year. The keeper chose his successor in recording the count, who was often a family member. In many cases, winter counts were buried with their keepers when they died, so that many winter counts were recreated copies done by an apprentice or collector.

Until the late 19th century, winter counts were recorded on buffalo hides. When buffalo became scarce, keepers resorted to using muslin, linen, or paper. The annual pictographs began on either the left or right side of the drawing surface and could be run in lines, spirals, or serpentine patterns. Epidemic diseases were commonly depicted in winter counts, providing some historical record of the effects of illnesses among tribes. By studying written accounts from fur traders, missionaries, and military personnel from a winter count's time and place of origin, scholars gain a broader understanding of the effects of epidemics.

Today, winter counts serve as valuable historical sources when recalling the history of the Great Plains peoples as well as their experiences with colonialism. During the nineteenth century, settler colonialism led to the marginalization of many groups of Sioux people. Because many Indigenous groups were not literate in a European sense, their story was largely omitted from an American history that was predominantly dependent on written source material.

== Corroborating dates ==
Garrick Mallery, a Smithsonian scholar, recognized that one of those events, "The Year the Stars Fell," correlated with the Leonid meteor storm of November 1833. He used that event to correlate the Lakota winter counts with western calendars and analyze the history of the people.

== Known winter counts ==
=== Oglala Lakota ===
- Tradition 1: No Ears, John Colhoff, Flying Hawk, Baptiste Garnier
- Tradition 2: Short Man
- Tradition 3: White Cow Killer
- Tradition 4: Iron Crow, Wounded Bear
- Tradition 5: Red Horse Owner
- Tradition 6: Cloud Shield
- Tradition 7: American Horse
- Tradition 8: Breast

=== Brulé Lakota ===
- Battiste Good and High Hawk
- Rosebud
- Swift Bear
- Swift Dog
- Iron Shell

=== Hunkpapa Lakota ===
- Iron Dog
- Lone Dog
- Long Soldier
- Major Bush

=== Miniconjou Lakota ===
- Swan
- Thin Elk / Wata Peta (Steamboat), 1821-1877

=== Other Lakota, and Dakota ===
- Hardin Winter Count
- Mato Sapa
- Northern
- The Flame
- Lone Dog's winter count

=== Blackfeet ===
- Bad Head, 1810–1883, oral count recorded
- Bull Plume, 1794–1924, survives only as copied drawings from 1912
- Percy Creighton, 1831-1938

=== Mandan ===
- Butterfly, 1833-1870s
- Foolish Woman, 1833-1870s

=== Kiowa ===
- Tohausen
- Silver Horn, 1860-1940
- Haba, 1828-1909
- Settan, 1833-1892
- Anko Seasonal, 1864–1892; and Anko Monthly, August 1889-August 1892
- Harry Ware, 1860-1887
- Quitone, 1825-1921

== See also ==
- Ledger art
- Plains hide painting
