= Fingerweaving =

Traditional loomless plaiting technique

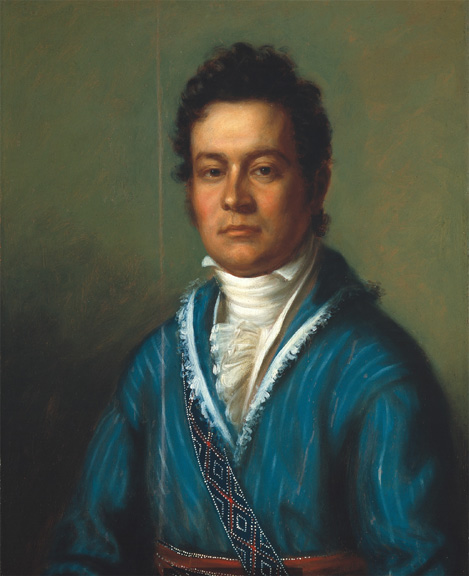
In this 1825 portrait by Charles Bird King, David Vann (later Treasurer of the Cherokee Nation) wears a fingerwoven sash and shoulder strap

Fingerweaving is an art form used mostly to create belts, sashes, straps, and other similar items through a non-loom weaving process. Unlike loom-based weaving, there is no separation between weft and warp strands, with all strands playing both roles. It is used among the Indigenous peoples of the Americas and in Europe.

== Scandinavian fingerweaving ==
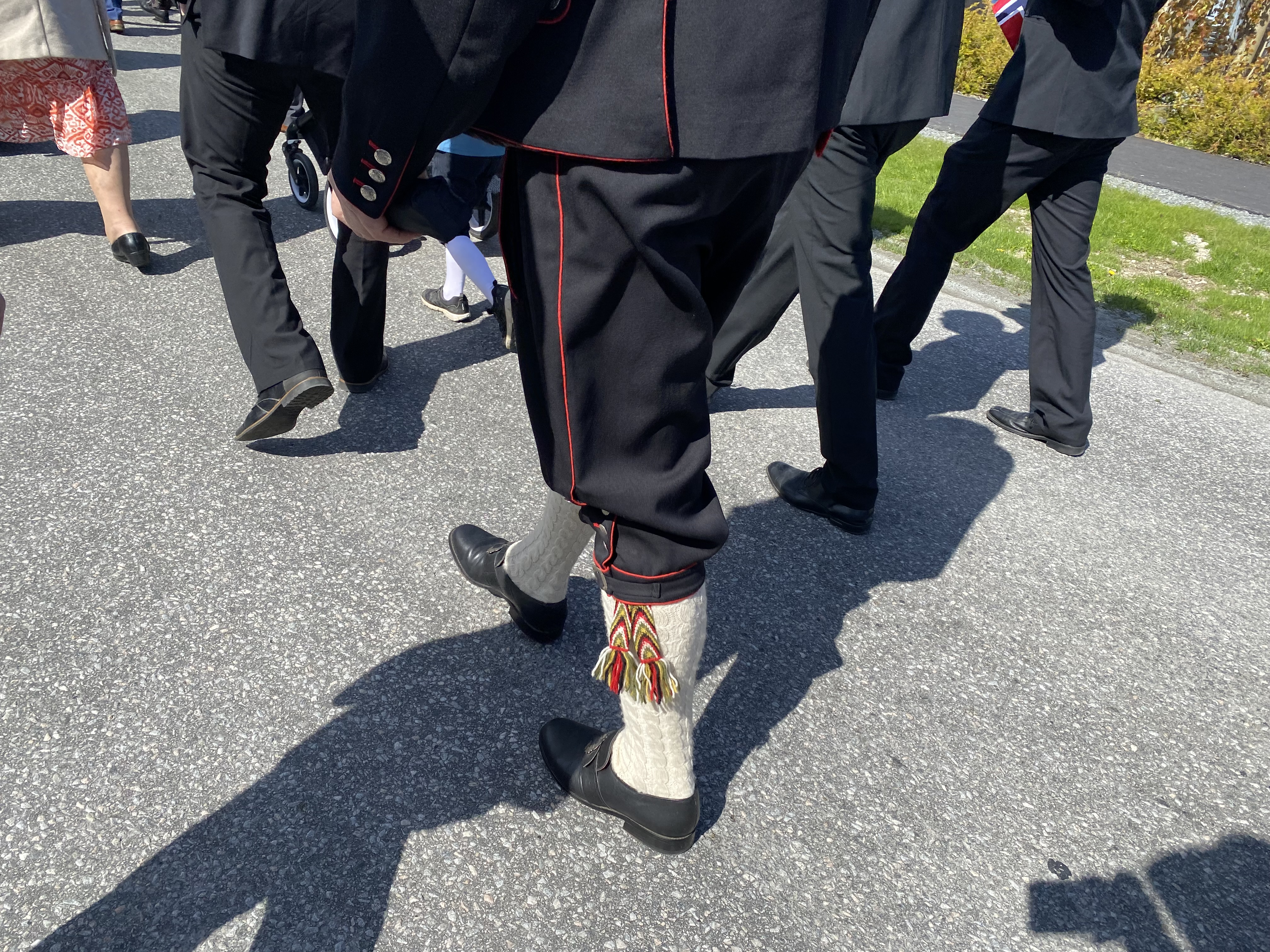
Sokkeband, worn as part of traditional Norwegian costumes

Fingerweaving has been used in Scandinavia at least since the Viking age. A fingerwoven ribbon was found in the Oseberg ship. Fingerwoven bands are part of the traditional costume (bundad) in several regions of Norway.

== Bibliography ==
- Barbeau, Marius (1939). Assomption Sash. Ottawa: Dept. of Mines, National Museum of Canada. 51 p. (National Museum of Canada bulletin; 75E). OCLC 655672792.
- Turner, Alta R. (1974). Fingerweaving. Sterling Publishing Co. ISBN 978-0935741131.
- Dendel, Esther Warner (1974). The Basic Book of Fingerweaving. New York: Simon & Schuster. ISBN 978-0671216979.
- Austin, Robert J. (2000). Fenner, Earl (ed.). A Manual of Fingerweaving. Book Pub Co. ISBN 978-1929572007.
- Findley, Gerald L. (2006). Fingerweaving Basics. Book Pub Co. ISBN 978-1929572083.
- James, Carol; La France, Janet (2011). Fingerweaving Untangled. Winnipeg: Carol James. ISBN 978-0978469504.
- James, Carol; La France, Janet (2015). Le fléché démêlé. (in French). Translated by Forbes, Lorraine. Winnipeg: Carol James. ISBN 9780978469511.
- Findley, Gerald Lee (2019) Fingerwoven Sashes BasicTechniques, The book provides detailed instructions for three forms of fingerweaving that were developed by the people of the First Nations, and the settlers of North America. Amazon print on demand, Paperback : 193 pages ISBN 978-1070707488, ASIN 1070707481
