= Museum of Indian Arts and Culture =

Museum of Indian Arts and Culture/Laboratory of Anthropology
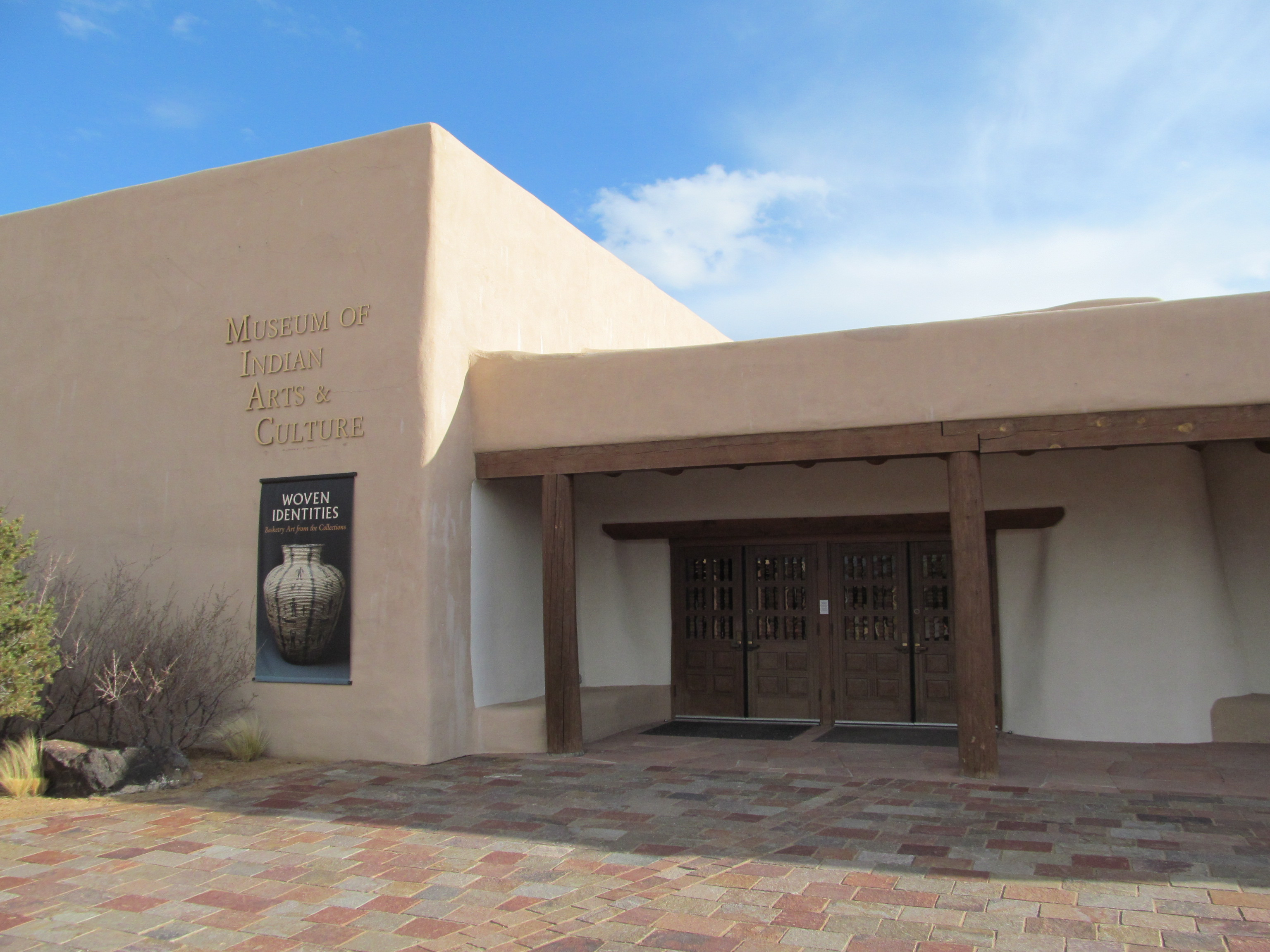
- Museum of Indian Arts and Culture
- Established: 1927
- Location: Santa Fe, New Mexico
- Type: Anthropology museum
- Director: Danyelle Means
- Website: www.indianartsandculture.org
- Laboratory of Anthropology
- U.S. National Register of Historic Places
- NM State Register of Cultural Properties
- Location within New Mexico Location within the United States
- Location: 708 Camino Lejo, Santa Fe, New Mexico
- Coordinates: 35°39′52″N 105°55′28″W
- Area: less than one acre
- Built: 1931
- Architect: John Gaw Meem
- Architectural style: Spanish Pueblo Revival
- NRHP reference No.: 83001630
- NMSRCP No.: 890

Significant dates
- Added to NRHP: July 12, 1983
- Designated NMSRCP: December 1, 1982

The Museum of Indian Arts and Culture is a museum of Native American art and culture located in Santa Fe, New Mexico. It is one of eight museums in the state operated by the New Mexico Department of Cultural Affairs and is accredited by the American Alliance of Museums as part of the Museum of New Mexico system. The museum and its programs are financially supported by the Museum of New Mexico Foundation.

The Museum of Indian Arts and Culture is dedicated to the accurate and culturally sensitive presentation of southwestern Native American cultures. Its mission statement emphasizes its intention to work closely with the Native communities of the region. The current director is Danyelle Means (Oglala Lakota). The interim director was Dr. Matthew Martinez (Ohkay Owingeh). Before Dr. Martinez, the prior director was Della Warrior (Otoe-Missouria).

== Collections ==
Object collections at the Museum of Indian Arts & Culture are divided administratively into "Individually Catalogued Collections," which include typological collections of Southwestern textiles, pottery, baskets, jewelry, contemporary art, and artifacts chronicling the everyday life of New Mexico's long period of human habitation. As the state repository for archaeological materials, the Museum has the responsibility to care for and maintain all artifacts excavated on state-owned land. Its Archaeological Research Collection contains artifacts numbering between 5 and 10 million. (As these artifacts are stored as "bulk" collections, and not catalogued individually, an exact count is unknown.

== Exhibitions ==
The museum has a regularly changing schedule of temporary exhibitions, which draw on the strengths of its collection. Long-term exhibitions on view at the museum include:

- Painted Reflections: Isomeric Design in Ancestral Pueblo Pottery, displays ancestral pottery from the 9th century to modern that exemplify using unpainted liminal space and negative space painted design to achieve meaningful optical illusions of texture and space.
- Clearly Indigenous: Native Visions Reimagined in Glass, featuring work by 33 distinct artists along with field innovator Dale Chihuly who is highlighted as introducing glass work to Indian Country by opening the first hot shop at the Institute of American Indian Arts in Santa Fe in 1974.
- The Buchsbaum Gallery of Southwestern Pottery, which contains nearly 300 ceramic vessels created by artists of the Pueblos of New Mexico and Arizona. Objects on display range from those created near the inception of pottery-making in the Southwest up to the present.
- Here, Now & Always, (currently closed for renovation, scheduled to reopen July 2022) a permanent major exhibition that documents the Southwest's indigenous communities and their challenging landscapes. Here, Now and Always includes more than 1,300 objects from the museum's collection accompanied by poetry, story, song and scholarly discussion.

== See also ==
- National Register of Historic Places listings in Santa Fe County, New Mexico
