= Native American fashion =

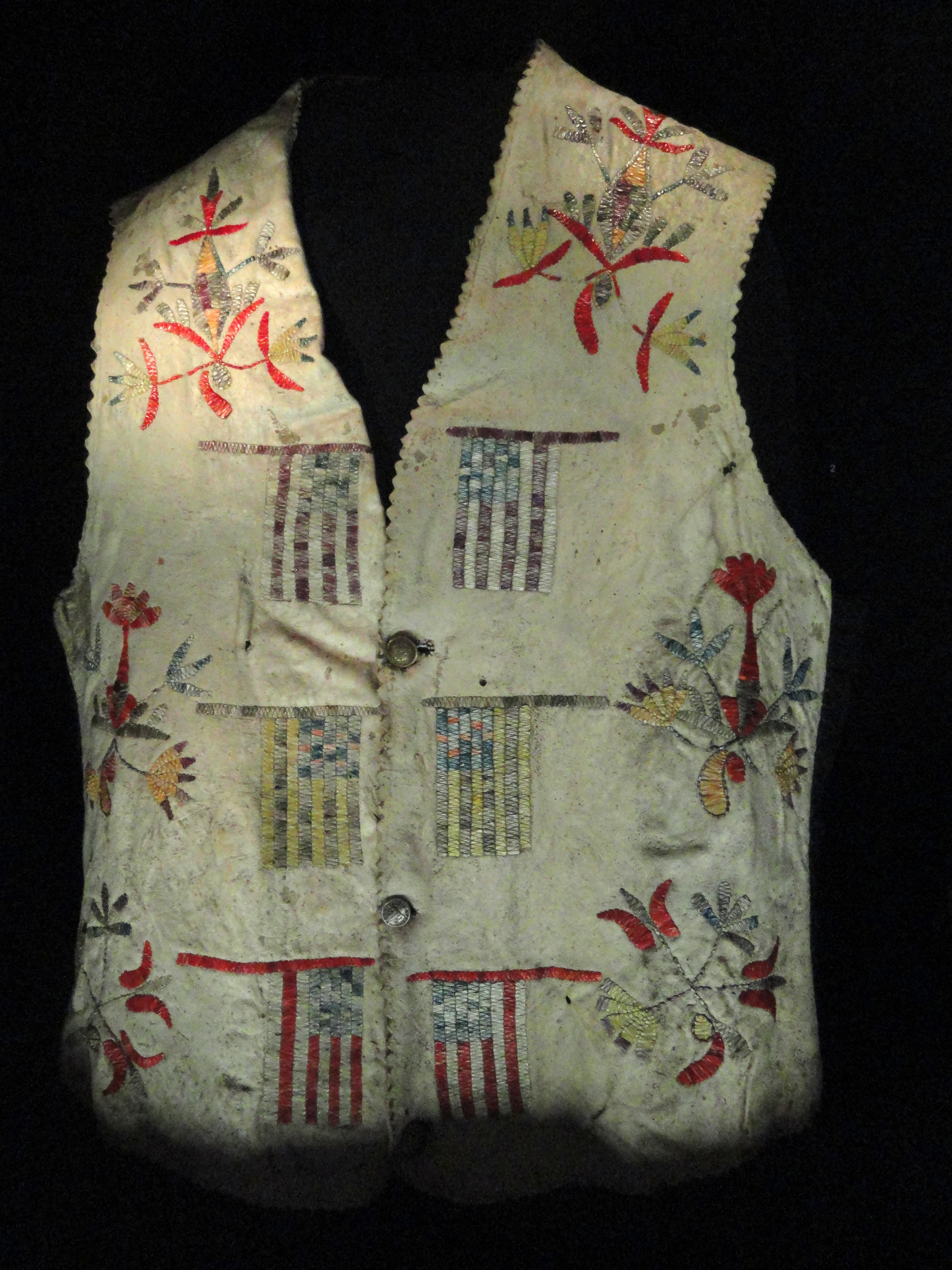
Quilled vest

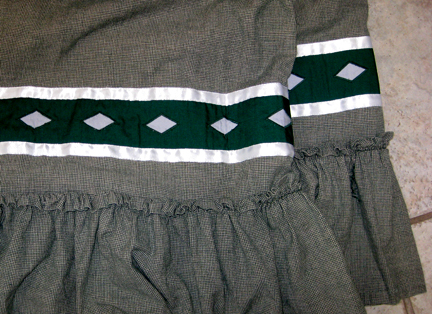
Ribbonwork by Ardina Moore

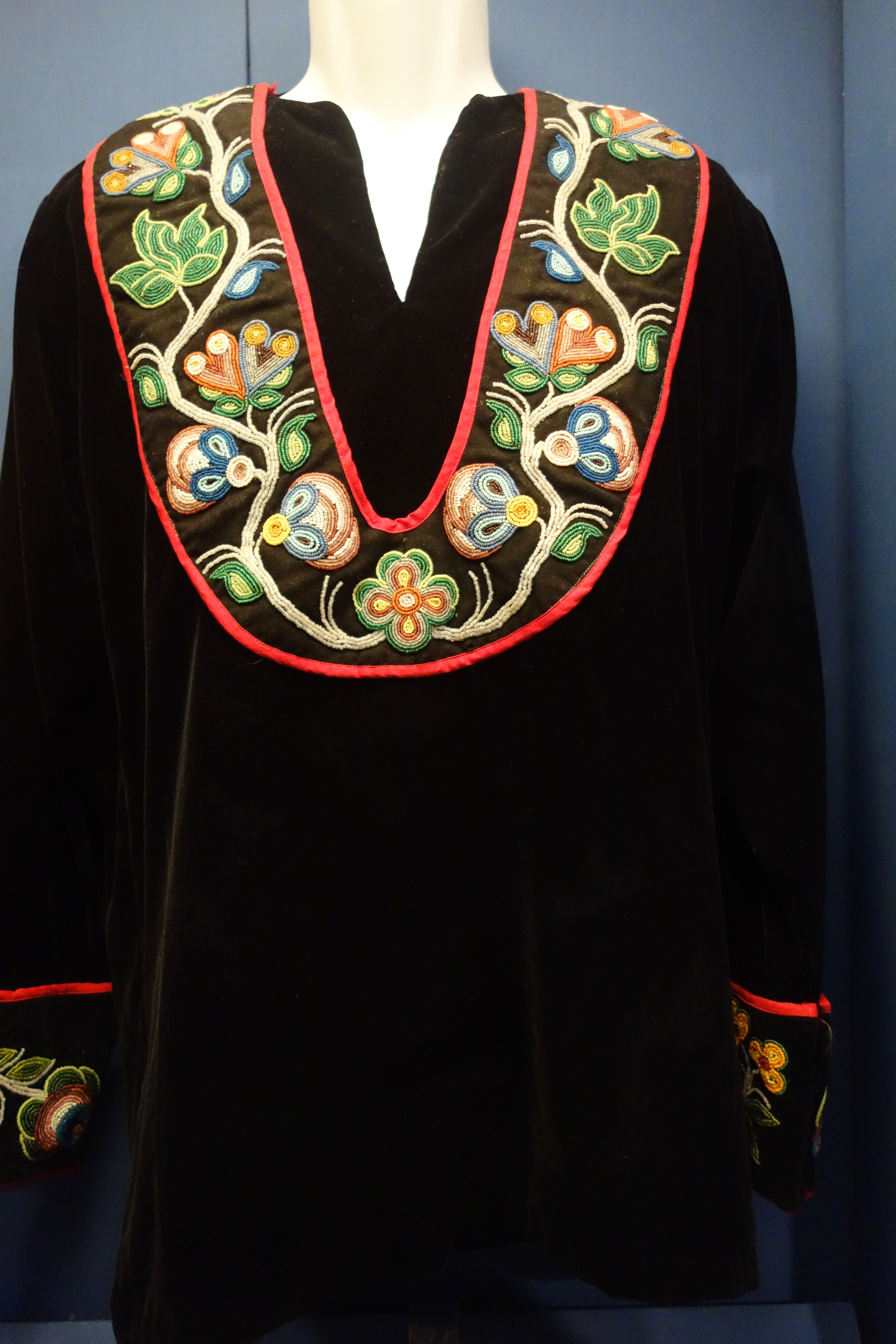
Ojibwe beaded velvet shirt, Wisconsin

Native American fashion is the design and creation of high-fashion clothing and fashion accessories by Native Americans in the United States. This is a part of a larger movement of Indigenous fashion of the Americas.

Indigenous designers frequently incorporate motifs and customary materials into their wearable artworks, providing a basis for creating items for the haute couture and international fashion markets. Their designs may result from techniques such as beadwork, quillwork, leather, and textile arts, such as weaving, twining, and tufting. In some cases, however, they choose not to include any materials associated with Indigenous cultures.

In the United States, under the Indian Arts and Crafts Act of 1990, in order to qualify as Native American designers, artists must be enrolled in a federally recognized tribe, state-recognized tribe, or be certified as a designated tribal artisan by the tribal council.

When Native American designers first broke into the modern fashion industry in the 1940s and 1950s, many adopted a pan-Indian approach. By selecting motifs and iconography easily identified as part of Indigenous culture, they were able to gain acceptance and develop a market share with mainstream buyers. As the field of Native designers in high fashion expanded, individual designers moved away from pan-Indianism, expressing their individual identity, whether or not it was based on their specific tribal heritage. Many have taken Indigenous themes and incorporated them into their works, while others have taken specific garments and updated them to contemporary aesthetics by changing necklines, sleeve lengths, hemlines, and other features.

Controversy has emerged over the misappropriation or inappropriate use of cultural heritage by non-Native designers. Respectful use of imagery by mainstream designers who are not Indigenous can help expand appreciation of Native cultures, but plagiarism of design or malapropos use reinforces negative stereotypes and spurs controversy. Similarly, utilizing artisan craftwork can expand awareness if designers are fairly compensated for their work and given credit for their contributions. Contemporary controversies have spurred both crowd-sourced and legislative action to protect the designs and cultural heritage of Indigenous designers.

== History ==
Historical clothing of Native American peoples has been collected and displayed by curators of major museums with a focus on pre-20th century attire. For the most part, these collections failed to take into consideration the shift in clothing trends among Indigenous peoples brought about by assimilation policies or by access to tailoring training and industrially produced textiles. However, Indigenous-focused museums have featured exhibitions of contemporary Native fashion. For example, the National Museum of the American Indian in New York City's 2017 "Native Fashion Now" exhibit featured Project Runway finalist Patricia Michaels and The Museum of Indian Arts and Culture in Santa Fe held exhibits as early as 2007 on Native couture and Institute of American Indian Arts founder Lloyd Kiva New.

While Native peoples have always produced clothing, until the 20th century the garments they made were often for personal, familial, or ceremonial use. However, forced assimilation policies throughout the 19th and early 20th centuries focused on eradicating Native American culture, including religious observance, language, and other traditional practices. Later, policies such as the 1934 Indian Reorganization Act changed the strategy for the education of Native peoples, encouraging them instead to reconnect with their cultures, including the creation of traditional dress.

In 1942, the American anthropologist Frederic H. Douglas, sought to highlight the beauty of Native American fashion by presenting a fashion show featuring garments made by Native Americans between 1830 and 1950. During the same decade, Lloyd Kiva New, a Cherokee who had graduated from the Art Institute of Chicago began touring throughout Europe and the United States with clothing and accessory lines he had designed, using hand-woven and dyed fabrics and leather crafts. In 1945, New opened a studio in Scottsdale, Arizona, with financial backing from Douglas, which initially focused on belts, hats and purses. Influenced by Navajo medicine bags, his purses, decorated with hand-worked metals became a specialty. Recognizing the need to reduce labor costs, he began combining machine work with handcrafting and instituted an apprenticeship program to meet increasing production demands while gearing his designs for the up-scale market.

Gaining coverage from national magazines like Harper's Bazaar and The New Yorker, New began selling his bags at the Elizabeth Arden Salon and Neiman Marcus. Expanding into clothing with a focus on classic cuts and simple designs using quality materials, New incorporated woven Cherokee fabrics, bead- and silver-work into a line of coats and dresses for women and men's suits, capitalizing on the luxury clothing market which emerged after World War II. "Southwestern chic" became a national trend in the early 1950s. In 1951, New was the only Native American designer who participated in the Atlantic City International Fashion Show, winning national recognition. He began to consult with artists and incorporated silk screened fabrics using native motifs, such as Pima basket weaving designs, Hopi pottery patterns, Navajo and Zuni yei elements, drawing from a variety of tribal aesthetics. As with designers who followed him, his sacred symbols and iconography were modified to become secularized.

To encourage other Indigenous artists to enter fashion design and safeguard cultural traditions which he feared might be lost, New turned his attention to education in 1959, sponsoring a summer design project, known as the Southwest Indian Arts Project. The experimental project eventually resulted in the founding by New and other artists of the Institute of American Indian Arts (IAIA) in 1962. The purpose of the school was to provide an education that fostered pride in students' Indigenous heritage and featured the development of skills designed to improve their economic opportunities. New taught a printed textiles course focused on dying techniques, and Azalea Thorpe (Scottish) taught weaving. Josephine Myers-Wapp (Comanche) was hired to instruct students in the traditional techniques used to make garments and accessories, laying the groundwork for the aesthetic appreciation of tribal traditions. She taught students to use traditional materials like feathers, leather and shells, and methods including beadwork, ribbonwork and weaving to create garments. By 1965, IAIA was hosting local fashion shows. Within three years, the students had begun showing their works in other venues in Arizona, New Mexico, Texas, and New York. Within ten years, the reputation of the textile design programs at the school had gained international acclaim.

During the 1970s, Native American designers began to make a name for themselves during the Indian and Natural movements, such as Jewel Gilham (Blackfeet) and Remonia Jacobsen (Otoe/Iowa). Gilham catered to working women, designing pantsuits and long dresses made of polyester fabrics with felt insets depicting geometric figures and native motifs. Jacobsen's work featured loose-fitting dresses featuring decorative techniques, such as embroidered ribbonwork in the Otoe and Iowa style, appliqué drawing on Seminole traditions, buckskin leggings patterned on Kiowa designs, as well as influences from Pueblo and Sioux decorative silhouettes. Fueled by the American Indian and Civil Rights Movement, countercultural consumers found appeal in Gilham and Jacobsen's work. Furthermore, their fashion fostered a pan-Indian unity in the quest for political power through self-expression.

== 1975 to 1990 ==
When Josephine Wapp retired in 1975, Sandy Fife Wilson (Muscogee) took over instruction of her traditional techniques course and offered "Traditional and Contemporary Fashion Design" to include current fashion trends. Fife's students formed the Full Moon Fashions group and began targeting non-native women as prospective buyers for their products. In 1982, when Wendy Ponca (Osage) took over the fashion design courses at the IAIA, she renamed them fiber arts in accordance with other accredited university curricula, offering three levels of instruction. She founded the Waves of the Earth Fashion Group and required her students to participate in the fashion shows of the IAIA, giving them an opportunity to show their creations and discover how to market their works. Ponca changed the direction of Native American fashion by allowing the designers to determine whether their works would include traditional influences and media. She taught them garment design, structural integrity, and color theory, but allowed students to interpret how they used the lessons. Ponca's approach was to ignore demands to make designs fit stereotypical definitions of Indigenous identity. Instead she encouraged creativity and innovation, like utilizing mylar, a space-age material to create designs which reflected the Osage connection with the sky.

The fashion show of the Santa Fe Indian Market, hosted for nearly two decades by fashion expert, Jeri Ah-be-hill (Kiowa), quickly became another venue to showcase the students' work, using the body as a venue to display designs, rather than galleries. Native Uprising, initially called Native Influx was founded in the 1980s as a collaborative association of Indigenous artists, designers, and models, who were alumni of IAIA, with the express purpose of building a contemporary, Native fashion design movement and allowing members to profit from their fashion shows. With New as an advisor and Ponca as the coordinator, the group included many members who made a name for themselves in fashion, for example Marcus Amerman (Choctaw), who acted as the stage director and RoseMary Diaz (Santa Clara Pueblo), who majored in fashion design and creative writing, before turning to writing about fashion.

In 1981, Margaret Wood (Navajo/Seminole) of Arizona, known for fashion design as well as for her quilts, published Native American Fashion: Modern Adaptations of Traditional Designs. The book was the first treatment of contemporary Native American fashion and remains the sole in-depth treatment of the subject. Also in the 1980s, Indigenous designers like Luanne Belcourt (Chippewa-Cree) and Myrtle Raining Bird (Chippewa-Cree) operated their company Sitting Eagles, marketing custom-made garments on their reservation to high-end buyers. Jeanette Ferrara (Isleta Pueblo) opened a design studio known for coats and vests incorporating cotton, wool, and velvet, and Ardina Moore (Quapaw/Osage) founded Buffalo Sun in Oklahoma in 1983. Geraldine Sherman (Lakota) designed for non-native marketer and anthropologist Helene Hagan to produce garments featuring Native American iconography. Hagan marketed them, stressing their spiritual and symbolic meaning.

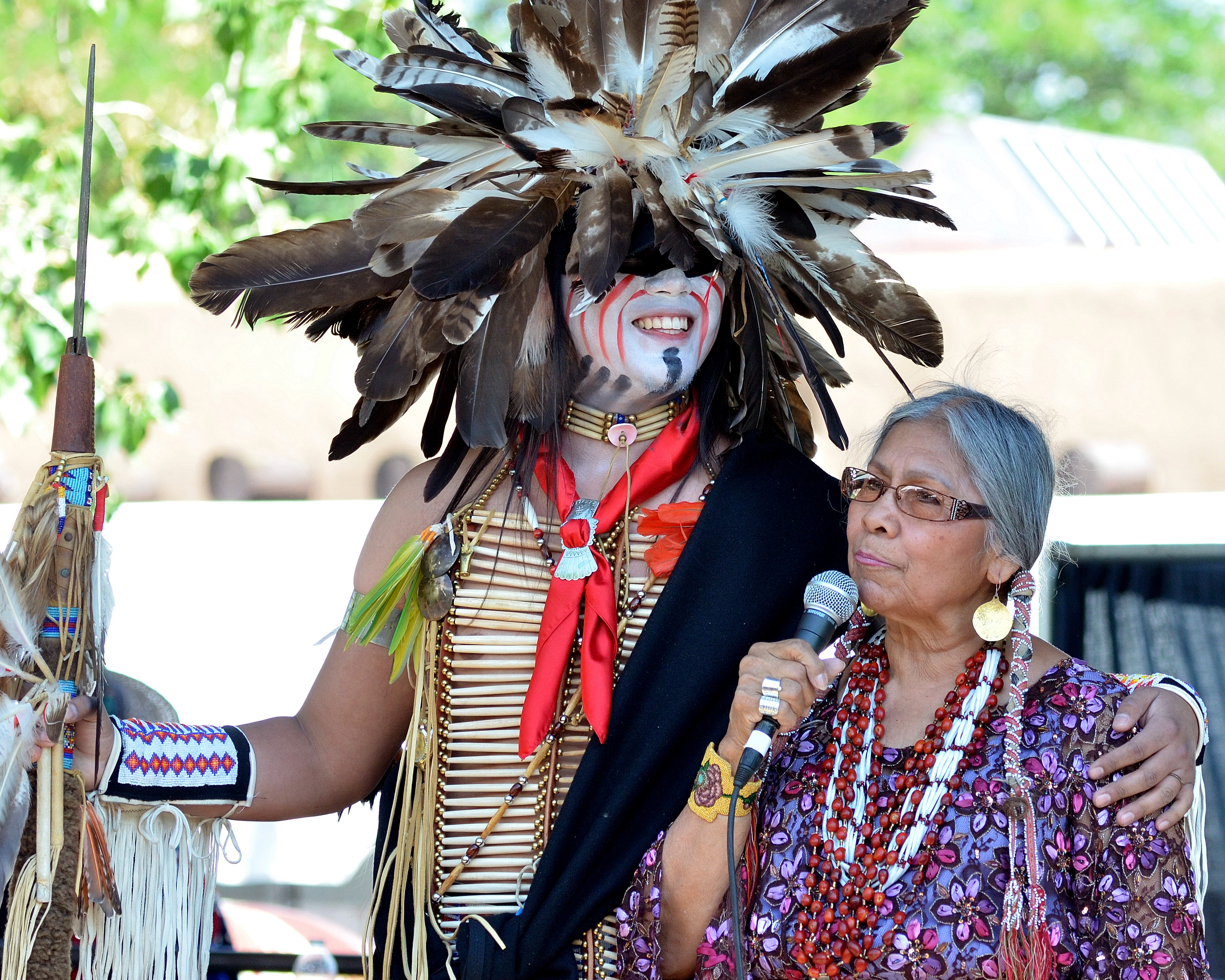
Jeri Ah-be-hill at the Santa Fe Indian Market 2014. Demonstration of the difference in dance regalia and experimental fashion.

Healthcare professional and fashion designer, Marjorie Bear Don't Walk (Chippewa-Salish) designed high-end couture for working women and displayed her fashions featuring appliqué techniques at conferences. Shed ran a mail order business, allowing customers to provide her with their preferred materials which she then worked into her designs. In 1984, Selina Curley (Apache-Navajo) founded a design firm, Traditions by Selina, aimed at preserving the traditions of her heritage. Her typical designs are based on the Apache camp dress with a full, ankle-length skirt and long sleeves.

The Wheelwright Museum of the American Indian, located in Santa Fe, New Mexico, hosted Talking Threads: Contemporary Native American Fashions in 1986. The exhibit featured designs by Joyce Begay-Foss (Navajo), Loretta Tah-Martin (Apache-Ponca) and Michelle Tsosie Naranjo (Santa Clara-Navajo-Laguna Pueblo-Mission), among others. The following year, the Red Earth Festival was established in Oklahoma City, showcasing creations by non-native designer Michael Kors, along with Phyllis Fife (Muscogee), to demonstrate that Native clothing was part of mainstream fashion. Fife was part of a group of native designers known as the Fashion Drums of Red Earth, who have made the fashion show of the Red Earth Festival an annual event, demonstrating that native clothing is wearable for every day and not simply as ceremonial costuming. Also in 1987, Patta PT Joest (Choctaw) established her firm Patta LT with the label Dancing Rabbit, to create high-fashion, producing contemporary garments with design elements from Southeastern Woodland tribal heritage. They included Cherokee tear dresses and Seminole patchwork vests, incorporating features such as Plains Tribes-style beadwork. Her line also included innovative bras and lingerie as well as broomstick skirts.

The Indian Arts and Crafts Act of 1990 was passed by the United States Congress. It specified that for artists to market their works as Native American, they must be enrolled in a state or federally recognized tribe or be certified by a tribal council as a member and must disclose their affiliated tribe. The law aimed to curtail the misappropriation of Native American designs by non-Natives wishing to capitalize on the Indigenous market. For Indigenous Americans, their symbols, such as the headdress have ceremonial and sacred properties. Inappropriate use of such objects, like the 2014 Next Top Model use of the headdress for non-Native models and its use in Dallas by Chanel for their Métiers d'Art show, were all too frequent occurrences. Though the law made it illegal to sell items by those not affiliated as a tribal member, little could be done when designs, symbols, or names were usurped. The law, written to protect the tribes and their cultures as a whole, does not cover individuals, with the result that there is no protection for the works of fashion designers. As part of their tribal tradition, symbols of various tribes are not typically trademarked, but one exception is the name "Navajo", which was legally trademarked in 1943.

== 1991–2010 ==
The 1990s saw a split in the Native American fashion design styles, with one group pursuing simple silhouettes with defined, smooth transitions between fabric lines, while the other group focused on avant-garde Indigenous couture. Among those who favored classic, clean lines were Betty David (Spokane), known for her shearling coats; Dorothy Grant (Haida), who trained at Vancouver's Helen Lefeaux School of Fashion Design and whose work includes images of flora and fauna of the Pacific Northwest, formline art and basketry designs; and Penny Singer (Navajo), who added photographic images on fabric to her traditional men's and women's shirts and accessories decorated with beads and ribbon work. Virgil Ortiz (Cochiti Pueblo) and Grant were the first Native American fashion designers to exhibit at an event in Manhattan. They held a show together at the Mercedes-Benz New York Fashion Week in 2009, though Ortiz's work generally is known as more cutting-edge and noted for incorporating colors, shapes, and symbols from pottery in his fashion design. Angela DeMontigny (Chippewa-Cree/Métis) of southwestern Ontario, a Canadian First Nation designer, also followed the classic traditional lines, with edgy elements based initially on leather and suede garments before branching into jewelry and accessories.

Other Native American designers from the early 1990s included the master weaver Margaret Roach Wheeler (Chickasaw/Choctaw), who earned a master's degree in art at Pittsburg State University in Kansas, under the tutelage of Marjorie Schick; Aresta LaRusso founded Deerwater Design in Flagstaff in 1994 featuring items made of silk or wool fabrics and deer or elk skin. To update her contemporary patterning, she used zebra and impala hide, decorated with beadwork, fringe, and silver.

Wendy Ponca, one of the leaders of the avant-garde group, left IAIA in 1993. After she was replaced by Pearl Sunrise (Navajo), a noted weaver, the fashion curriculum at IAIA was eliminated in 1995, though momentum for high fashion works produced by native designers was rising. Among Ponca's students at IAIA in the 1990s were the designers Pilar Agoyo (Ohkay Owingeh/Cochiti/Kewa), who works on costuming for several films, including Indiana Jones and the Kingdom of the Crystal Skull (2008) and The Avengers (2012), and Patricia Michaels (Taos Pueblo), who went on to take second place in season 11 of Project Runway. Her women's jacket titled "Weathered Text: No Trespassing by the Taos War Chief." won the Best of Class award in the textiles category at the Santa Fe Indian Market in 2010. Another of Ponca's students, Brenda Wahnee (Comanche), developed her own line Com-N-Acha, featuring fashion forward designs. Her works were featured in 2003 at the Grammy Fest party. Tazbah Gaussoin (Picuris Pueblo/Navajo), Consuelo Pascual (Navajo/Maya), and Rose Bean Simpson (Santa Clara Pueblo) were other Ponca students who began making a name in fashion circles in the 1990s.

In 2005, the IAIA with support from the W. K. Kellogg Foundation, sponsored Tribal Fusions, as a cross-cultural fashion endeavor, uniting designers from Africa with Marcus Amerman, Dorothy Grant, Patricia Michaels, and Virginia Yazzie Ballenger for the annual fashion show at the Santa Fe Indian Market. It was a unique opportunity for designers from diverse Indigenous populations to share designs and methods of economic empowerment. In 2009, Jessica Metcalfe (Chippewa), a scholar who earned her doctorate from the University of Arizona, created a fashion blog called "Beyond Buckskin". Metcalfe used the blog to promote Native American designers, to talk about how they fit into popular culture and also to hold companies accountable when they attempted to appropriate Native culture. The following year, Patricia Michaels formed UNRESERVED Alliance, in an attempt to ensure that Native American fashion designers were represented at New York Fashion Week. Similarly to Native Uprising founded two decades previously, the collective of designers aimed through collaboration to improve inclusion of Indigenous artists.

== 2011 and beyond ==
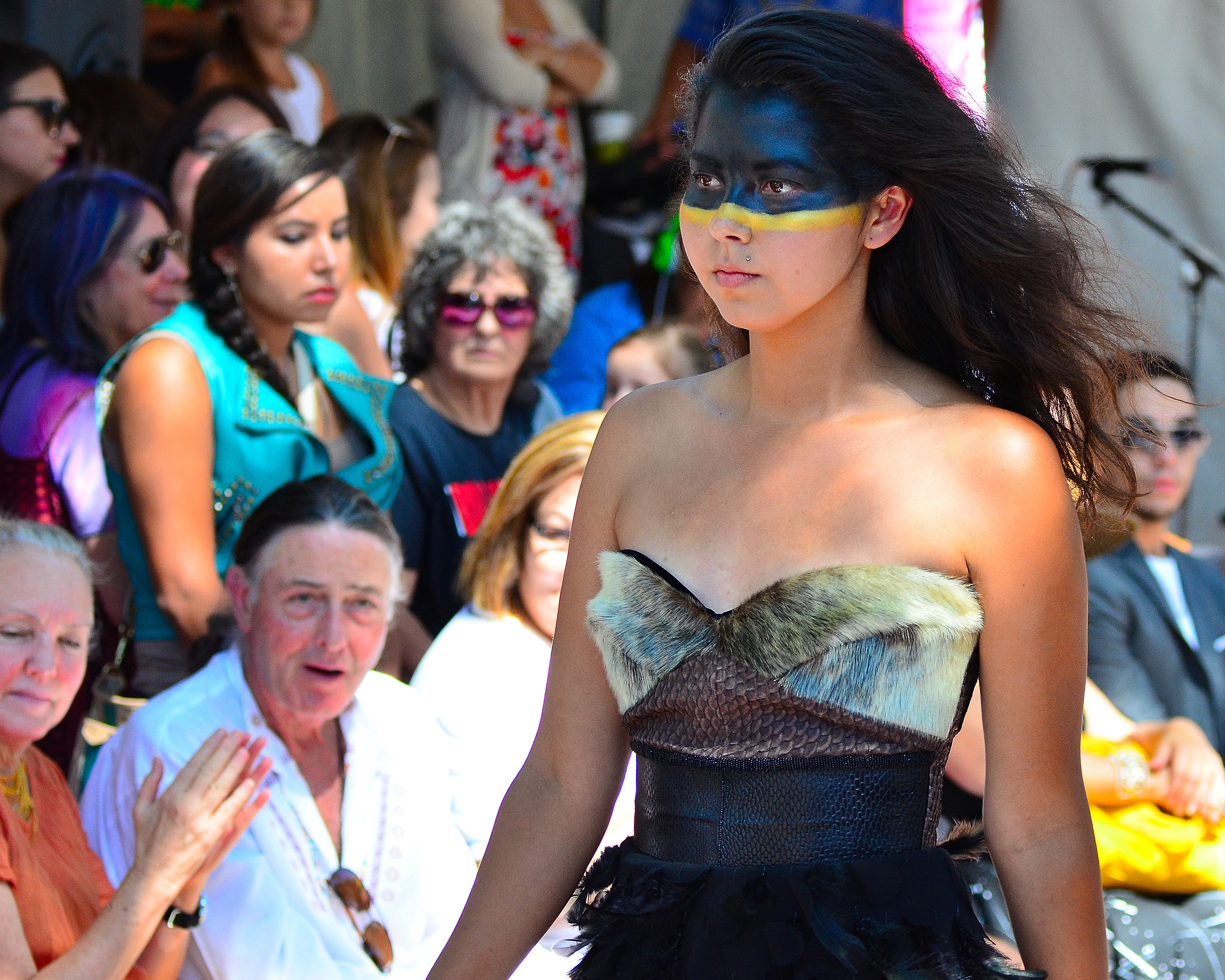
Santa Fe Indian Market Fashion show 2014

As Native American designers recognized that marketing to Indigenous peoples alone limited their business sustainability, they increasingly created clothing that is derived from their cultural heritage but has been adapted to appeal to a larger aesthetic. Early designers tended to approach fashion from a pan-Indian perspective, but contemporary Indigenous designers often "stay within the realm of their own traditional tribal or regional clothing techniques". In 2012, Kelly Holmes (Cheyenne River Lakota), a former model, founded Native Max, "the first Native American fashion magazine". Jessica Metcalf (Turtle Mountain Chippewa), who wrote the "Beyond Buckskin" blog, opened a fashion boutique in Gardena, North Dakota the same year. Metcalfe, along with photographer Anthony Thosh Collins and designer Bethany Yellowtail (Northern Cheyenne/Crow) created a compilation of fashion called Beyond Buckskin Lookbook which she says is the "first compilation of modern Native fashion produced exclusively by Natives". In 2014, Loren Aragon (Acoma Pueblo) and Valentina Aragon (Diné) founded the ACONAV couture brand known for its asymmetrical designs that blend cultural ideas with modern silhouettes. Virgil Ortiz (Cochiti Pueblo) creates futuristic fashion designs that reference the Pueblo Revolt of 1680 blended with science fiction narratives about fighters for freedom based in the year 2180.

In 2016, a survey exhibition, "Native Fashion Now," curated by Karen Kramer at the Peabody Essex Museum in Salem, Massachusetts, traveled to Philbrook Museum of Art in Tulsa, Oklahoma, Portland Art Museum in Oregon, and the Smithsonian's National Museum of the American Indian in Manhattan. The exhibition and its catalog spotlighted on contemporary Native American fashion. Featuring designs from 75 fashion designers from throughout Canada and the United States, the exhibit presented a range of styles and designs from diverse cultures, such as Alano Edzerza (Tahltan Nation), Maya Stewart (Chickasaw/Muscogee/Choctaw) and Bethany Yellowtail (Northern Cheyenne/Crow), among others. Becki Bitternose (George Gordon), who designs jackets and coats from Pendleton blankets, was featured at the 2016 New York Fashion Week.

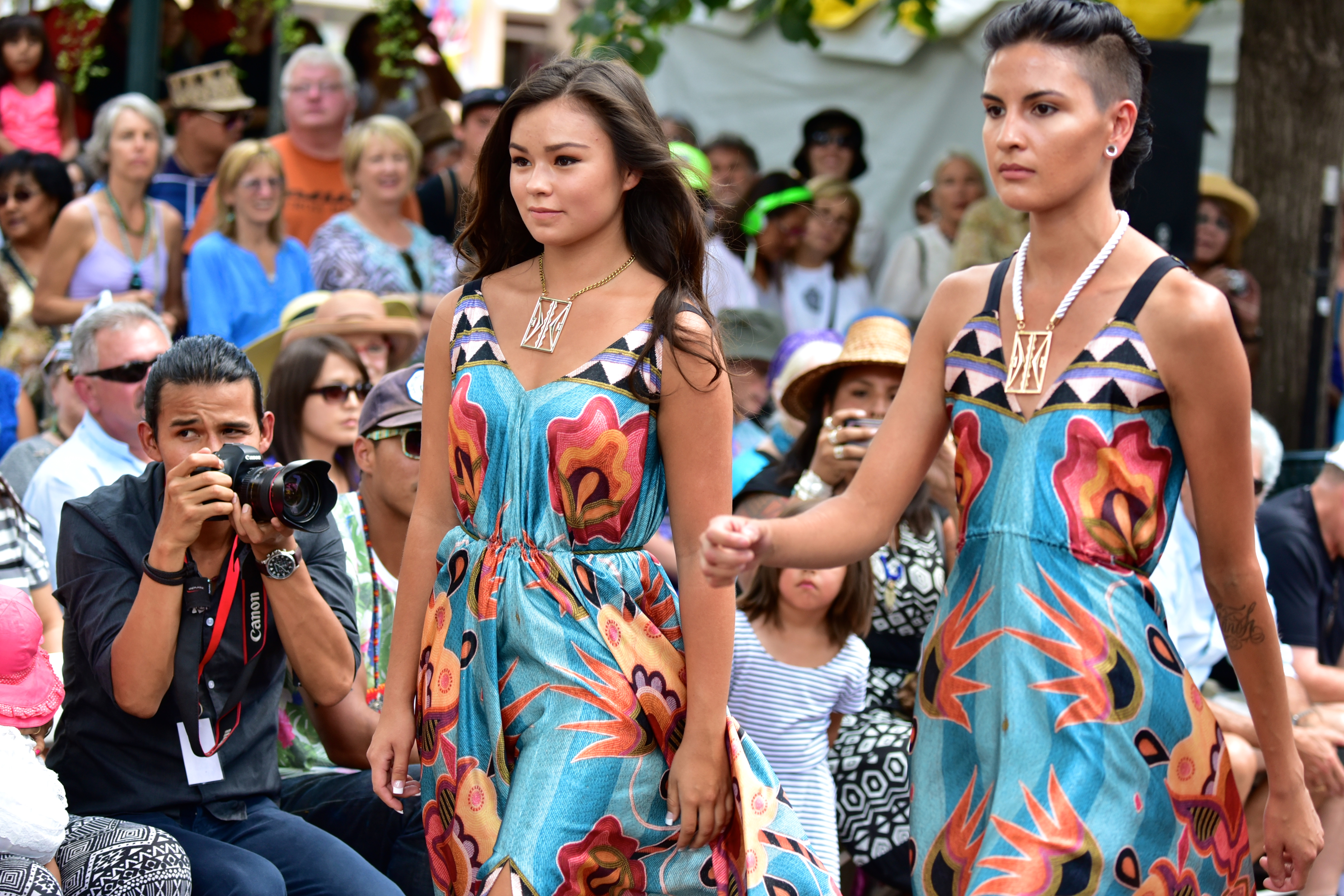
Contemporary Native American Fashion Show at the 2015 Santa Fe Indian Market.

== Controversy ==
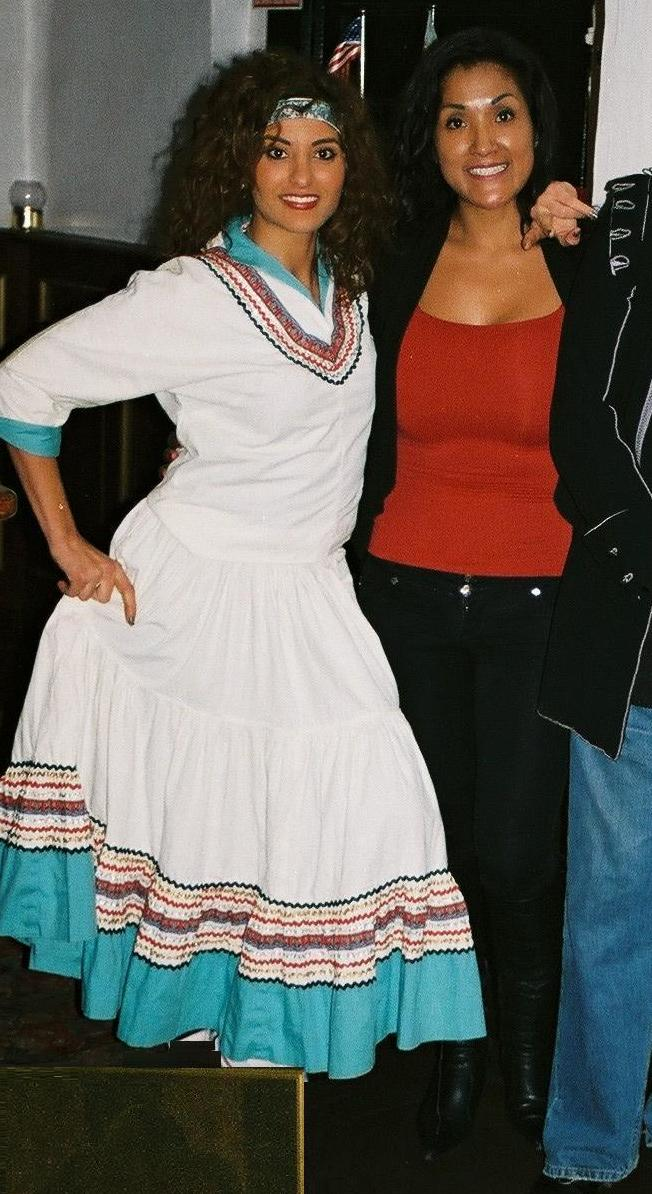
The woman on the left is wearing a "Squaw Dress."

Non-Native companies and individuals have attempted to use Native American motifs and names in their clothing designs. As early as the 1940s, Anglo designers in the United States had developed a type of one and two-piece dresses called "squaw dresses." These outfits were based on Mexican and Navajo skirts and Western Apache camp dresses. The dresses, also known as Fiesta, Kachina, Tohono or Patio Dresses "represented both idealized femininity and Americanness because of their Native American origins." These dresses, knowingly appropriating Indigenous styles, were considered a "fashion sensation" of the time, according to the Arizona Daily Star. The Navajo style that influenced the creation of Squaw Dresses was itself an adaptation of European styles by Navajo women. The bodice of a Squaw Dress drew from Western Apache and Tohono O'odham styles. Squaw dresses were popular in the United States for around 20 years. The original "designer" of the Squaw Dress was Dolores Gonzales of Tucson, Arizona. Gonzales herself said of her dresses, "I didn't design them; I lifted them. The Indian women were already wearing them." Other people involved in promoting and working on the designs included the designers Cele Peterson and George Fine.

Urban Outfitters created a collection in 2011 called "Navajo," featuring underwear, hats and other items with art based on traditional Navajo rugs. The Navajo Nation responded by issuing a cease and desist on their use of the word "Navajo". Pop band No Doubt released a 2012 video featuring stereotypical images of the American frontier and ended up pulling the video and issuing an apology. Victoria's Secret clothed a model in a "Native-inspired" bikini and giant war headdress at their fashion show that same year. Victoria's Secret was again accused of cultural appropriation in their 2017 fashion show, which featured outfits inspired by traditional Native fashion.

Another issue in regard to Native American fashion is the stereotypical representation of Indigenous peoples' clothing in mass media depictions. Native Americans are portrayed most often in historical contexts wearing traditional clothing.

== See also ==
- Textile arts of the Indigenous peoples of the Americas
- Inuit clothing
