= Traditional Native American clothing =

Traditional Native American clothing is the apparel worn by the indigenous peoples of the region that became the United States before the coming of Europeans. Because the terrain, climate and materials available varied widely across the vast region, there was no one style of clothing throughout, but individual ethnic groups or tribes often had distinctive clothing that can be identified with them. The arrival of Europeans introduced new materials, e.g. beads, dyes, silk ribbons and thread, which were incorporated into the clothing.

Modern Native Americans continue to wear traditional clothing, usually just on special occasions, to honor their cultures and traditions. Native American fashion designers often incorporate motifs or customary materials of traditional clothing in their designs.

== Types of clothing ==
- Breechcloth
- Buffalo robe
- Ghost shirt
- Jingle dress
- Moccasin
- Roach
- War bonnet

== Materials ==
- Buckskins

== See also ==
- Textile arts of the Indigenous peoples of the Americas
- Inuit clothing
- Yup'ik clothing
- Folk costume
- Native American jewelry
