= Squaw dress =

American style of dress

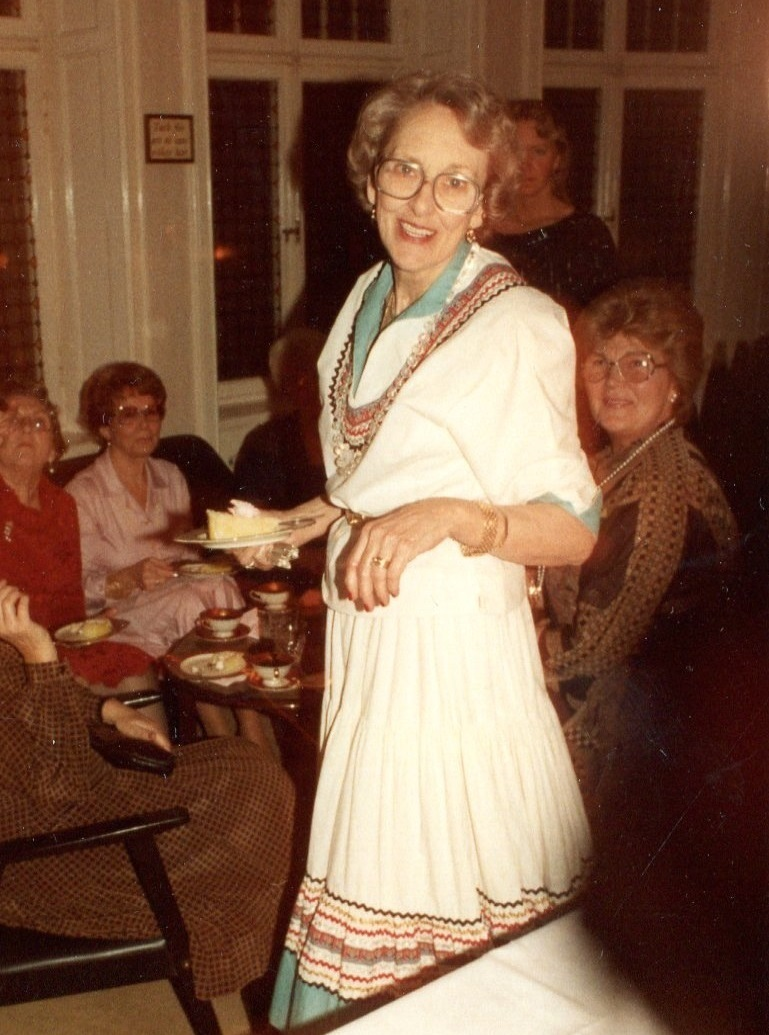
Birgit Ridderstedt wears her 1950s squaw dress on Thanksgiving 1984 for her 70th birthday party

A squaw dress, fiesta dress, Kachina, Tohono or patio dress is an American style of dress developed in Arizona. It became popular during the 1940s and 1950s, and many famous women owned these dresses. It was developed primarily by Dolores Gonzales and Cele Peterson, who were inspired by Native American fashion.

== Overview ==
The squaw dress could be either one or two pieces, with a two-piece "dress" consisting of a skirt and a blouse. They were made with cotton or calico print. The skirt part of the dress is pleated, gathered or fully gathered with three-tiers. The dresses were often colorful and incorporated rickrack as well. The hemlines sometimes copied Native American basket designs. Many squaw dresses would be accessorized with concho belts, squash blossom necklaces and turquoise earrings. Later versions of the squaw dress included metallic fabrics and glitter.

The garment was described as being comfortable and flattering to most figures, according to The Arizona Republic. The dresses were lightweight and comfortable to wear on hot days. They did not require ironing. In addition, the dress could be worn for many different kinds of occasions.

== History ==
PSA about Western fashions in Arizona, including the "squaw dress".

The original designs that served as the basis of the squaw dress skirt were found in Navajo broomstick skirts. These skirts and blouses that the Navajo wore were, in turn, based on 1870s and 1880s European fashions and fabrics. By 1910, a unique style had developed which incorporated Navajo ideals of beauty and it had become widespread among Navajo women. The dresses also reflected a sense of "cultural revitalization, high self-esteem, and ethnic identity," according to professor of American Indian studies Nancy Parezo and Angelina R. Jones. Bodices and blouses worn with the skirts reflected different origins. Loose blouses paired with the skirt came from Western Apache and Tohono O'odham dress. The squaw dress also had Mexican influences.

The different looks of the dress were based on different types of popular Navajo, Mexican, Tohono O'odham and Western Apache dresses. Zuni and Hopi dress were also an inspiration. The squaw dress also shows influence from the New Look in fashion. Using the term "squaw" to name the dresses evoked a connection to Native American culture. In addition, the Native American roots of the design made the dresses seem like uniquely "American" clothing items. The dress also became synonymous with the Southwest.

The squaw dress started out as a trend in the American Southwest in the 1940s and went nationwide in the 1950s. The first designers of the squaw dress are unknown, however designers such as Dolores Gonzales and Cele Peterson were selling dresses they called "squaw Dresses" by 1948. Bill and Elizabeth Macey who owned a clothing manufacturing plant called the Arizona Shirt Company, created a design for the squaw dress as well. The Maceys' design was considered "smart," but authentic, according to The Arizona Republic. George Fine who owned Georgie of Arizona was another major creator of the dresses. Lloyd Kiva New, a Cherokee designer, also created squaw dresses. Eventually J.C. Penney, Woolworth's and Neiman Marcus were selling versions of the squaw dress. In 1954, Gimble's department store in Philadelphia held a fashion show where "Princess Red Rock" modeled the dress on the runway and the store sold versions of the dress. Women such as Mamie Eisenhower, Pat Nixon, Cyd Charisse and Elsa Martinelli were seen in these dresses.

Squaw dresses went out of fashion nationally by 1960, but remained popular in the southwestern United States and also in square dancing and rodeos. When the style was revisited in later decades, the dresses were labeled as "Western wear" and given new names. These dresses are today more often called patio or fiesta dresses.

== Tucson-based dress designers (1950–1960) ==
- Dolores Resort Wear
- Alpha Sportswear or Alpha of Tucson
- Cele Peterson
- Costa Co.
- Danzy Manufacturing Co.
- Faye Creations and Western Fun Togs (Frye R. Cohen)
- Georgie of Arizona (George Fine)
- Imlach of Tucson (James Imlach)
- Desert Togs (Bea Barcelo)
- GRETA'S (Greta De Luca)

== Controversy ==
Because the squaw dress borrows from various different indigenous people's clothing and because of the use of the word "squaw," there were people who were uncomfortable with the fashion. Designer Dolores Gonzales admitted that she had taken the idea for the design from Native American women's clothing. In a 1954 article in The Arizona Daily Star, the dresses were described as "What was once worn proudly by Indian squaws is now being worn across the country by many women." Anthropologist Adelaide Law believed that the dresses were blatant ploys to cash in on "tourist trade." Curator Frederick H. Douglas, who was known for his early exhibits of Native American fashion, felt that using the name "squaw" was disrespectful. Around the same time the dresses went out of fashion in the 1960s, the Native American community began to decry the use of the word "squaw," which was seen as derogatory. Modern use of the word "squaw" to describe the dress is seen as culturally insensitive.
