= Textile arts of the Indigenous peoples of the Americas =

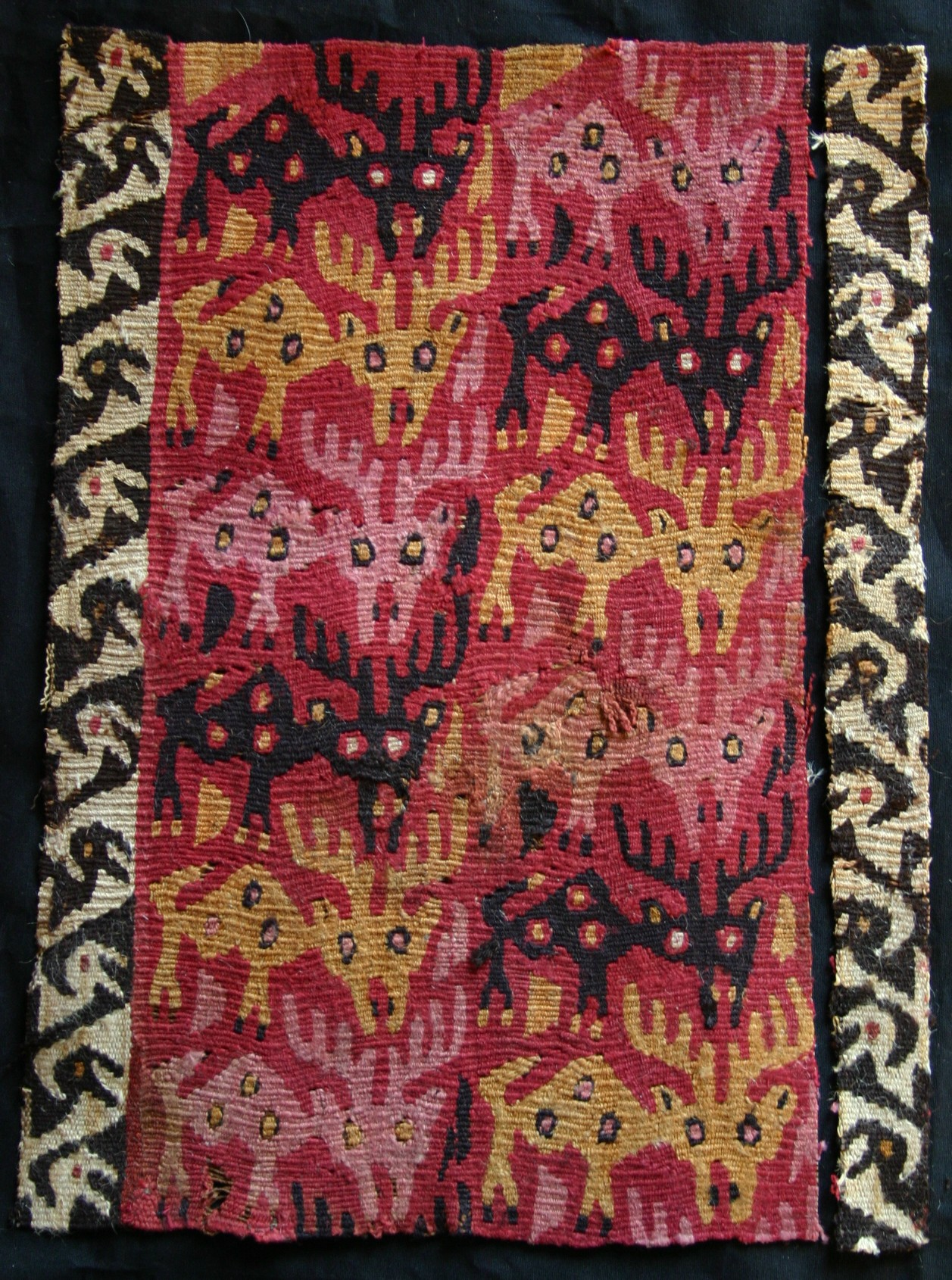
Chancay culture tapestry featuring deer, 1000-1450 CE, Lombards Museum

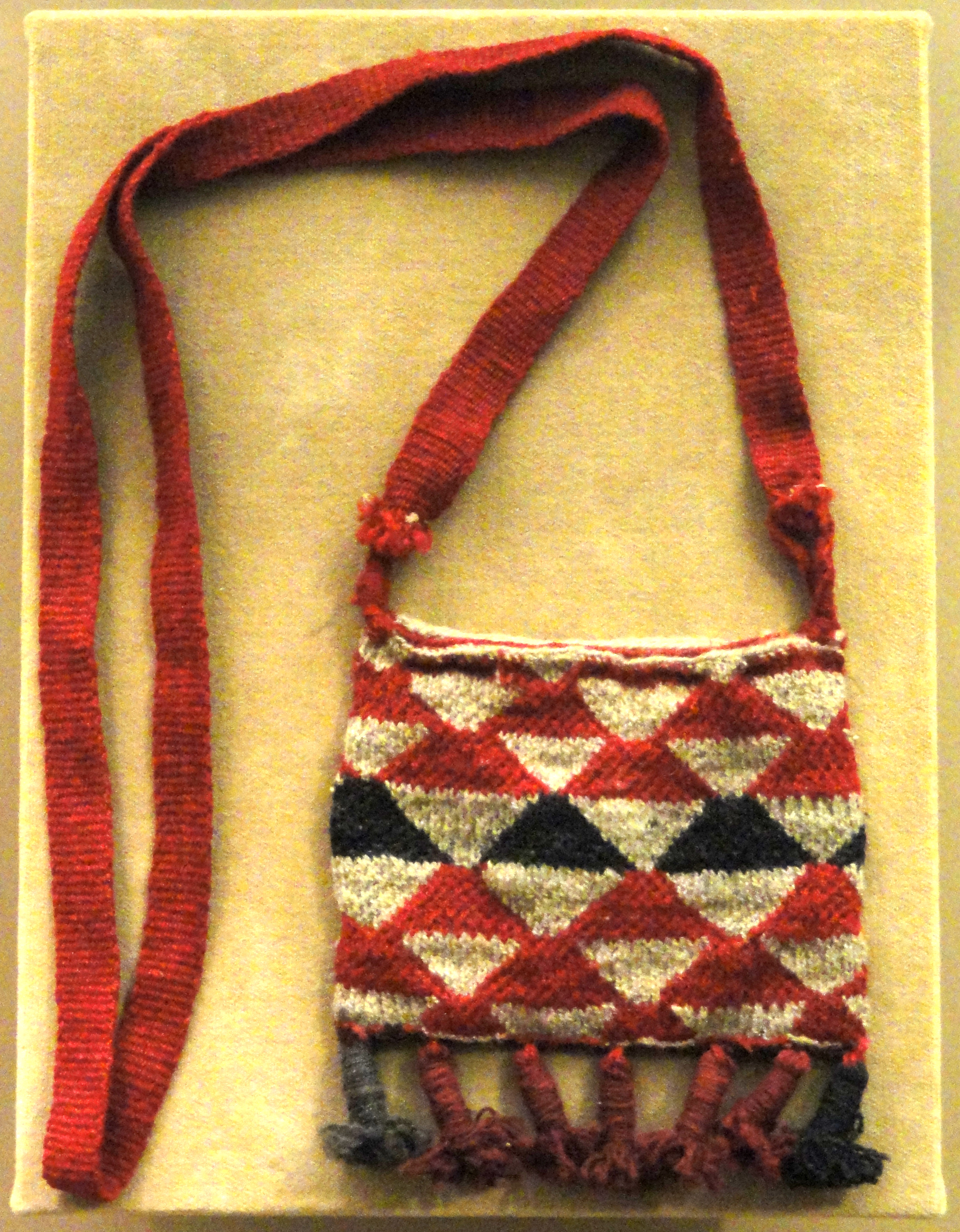
Nivaclé textile pouch, collection of the AMNH

The textile arts of the Indigenous peoples of the Americas are decorative, utilitarian, ceremonial, or conceptual artworks made from plant, animal, or synthetic fibers by Indigenous peoples of the Americas.

Textile arts and fiber arts include fabric that is flexible woven material, as well as felt, bark cloth, knitting, embroidery, featherwork, skin-sewing, beadwork, and similar media. Textile arts are one of the earliest known industries. Basketry is associated with textile arts.

While humans have created textiles since the dawn of culture, many are fragile and disintegrate rapidly. Ancient textiles are preserved only by special environmental conditions. The oldest known textiles in the Americas are some early fiberwork found in Guitarrero Cave, Peru dating back to 10,100 to 9,080 BCE.

The oldest known textiles in North America are twine and plain weave fabrics preserved in a peat pond at the Windover Archaeological Site in Florida, the earliest dating to 6,000 BCE.

== Cultural regions ==
=== Andes ===
An Inca quipu, or textile recording device

As previously mentioned, fragments of rope and textiles dating back between 12,100 and 11,080 years ago have been unearthed from Guitarrero Cave in Peru. Because of the extremely dry conditions of the desert sands, twined textiles from the Norte Chico civilization in Peru have survived, dating back to 2500-1800 BCE. Cotton and wool from alpaca, llamas, and vicuñas have been woven into elaborate textiles for thousands of years in the Andes and are still important parts of Quechua and Aymara culture today. Coroma in Antonio Quijarro Province, Bolivia is a major center for ceremonial textile production. An Aymara elder from Coroma said, "In our sacred weavings are expressions of our philosophy, and the basis for our social organization... The sacred weavings are also important in differentiating one community, or ethnic group, from a neighboring group..." Aguayos are clothes woven from camelid fibers with geometric designs that Andean women wear and use for carrying babies or goods.

Inca textiles

Awasaka was the most common grade of weaving produced by the Incas of all the ancient Peruvian textiles, this was the grade most commonly used in the production of Inca clothing. Awaska was made from llama or alpaca wool and had a high thread count (approximately 120 threads per inch). Thick garments made from awaska were worn as standard amongst the lower classes of the Andean highlands, while lighter cotton clothing was produced on the warmer coastal lowlands. Peruvian Pima cotton, as used by the Incas, is still regarded as one of the finest cottons available on today’s market.

The finest Inca textiles were reserved for the nobility and royalty, including the emperor himself. This cloth, known as qompi, was of exceptionally high quality and required a specialized and state-run body of dedicated workers. Qompi was made from the finest materials available, alpaca, particularly baby alpaca, and vicuña wool were used to create elaborate and richly decorated items. As a result of their smoothness, Inca textiles made of vicuña fiber are described as "silk" by the first Spanish explorers. The finest Inca cloth had a thread count of more than 600 threads per inch, higher than that found in contemporaneous European textiles and not excelled anywhere in the world until the industrial revolution in the 19th century.

=== Circum-Caribbean ===
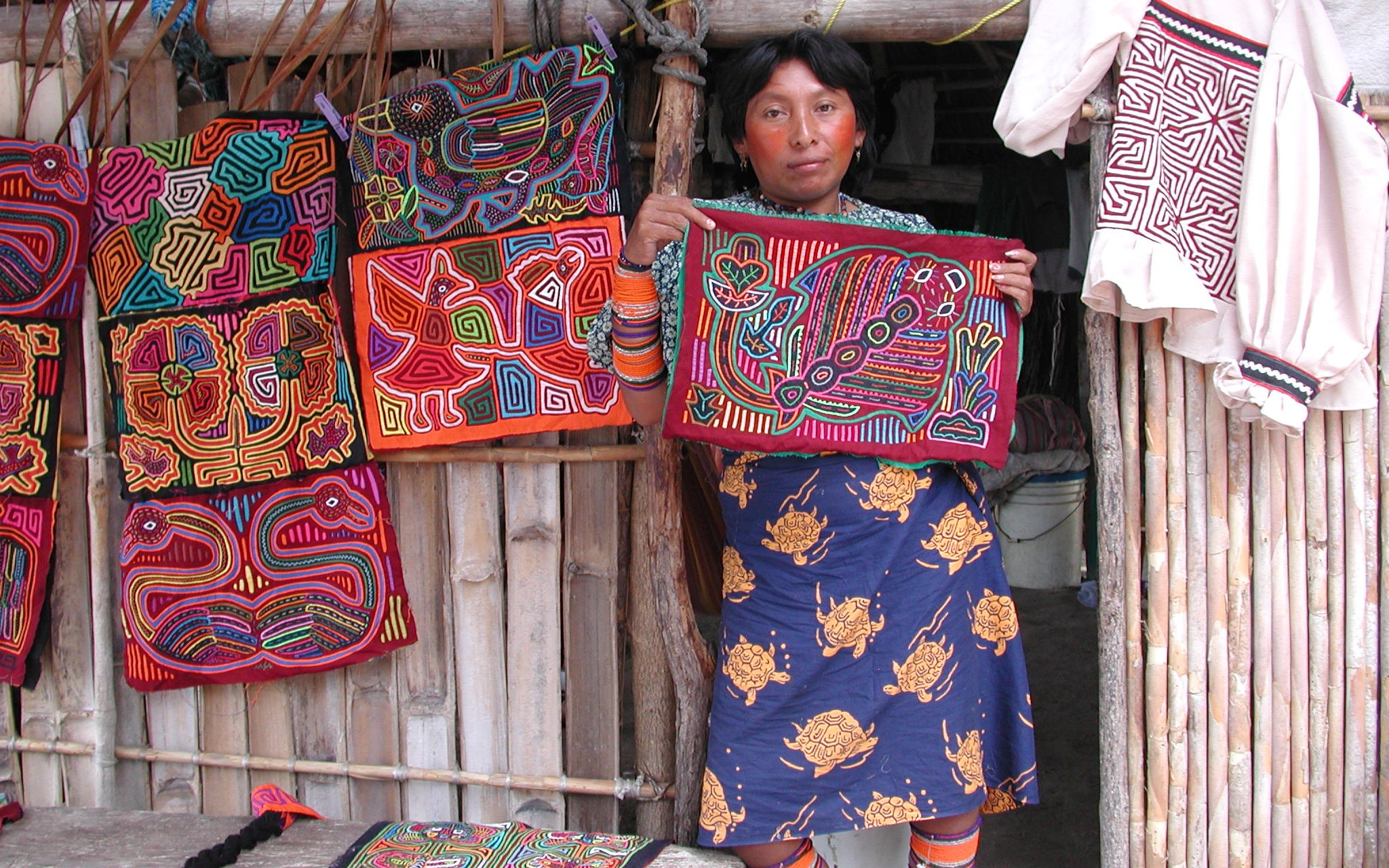
Guna woman with molas, San Blas Islands, Panama.

Guna tribal members of Panama and Colombia are famous for their molas, cotton panels with elaborate geometric designs created by a reverse appliqué technique. Designs originated from traditional body art designs but today exhibit a wide range of influences, including pop culture. Two mola panels form the bodice of a blouse. When a Guna woman is tired of a blouse, she can disassemble it and sell the molas to art collectors.

=== Mesoamerica ===
Maya women have woven cotton with backstrap looms for centuries, creating items such as huipils or traditional blouses. Elaborate Maya textiles featured representations of animals, plants, and figures from oral history. In modern times, weaving serves as both an art form and a source of income. Organizing into weaving collectives have helped Maya women earn better money for their work and greatly expand the reach of Maya textiles in the world.

=== Oasisamerica ===
Pueblo men weave with cotton on upright looms. Their mantas and sashes are typically made for ceremonial use for the community, not always for outside collectors.

Navajo rugs are woven by Navajo women today from Navajo-Churro sheep, other breeds of sheep, or commercial wool. Designs can be pictorial or abstract, based on historic Navajo, Spanish, Asian, or Persian designs. 20th century Navajo weavers include Clara Sherman and Hosteen Klah, who co-founded the Wheelwright Museum of the American Indian.

Valencia, Joseph and Ramona Sakiestewa (Hopi) and Melissa Cody (Navajo) explore non-representational abstraction and use experimental materials in their weaving.

=== Northwest Coast ===
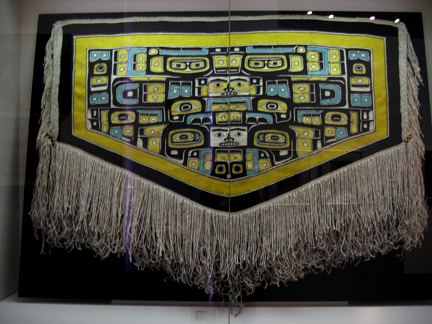
Chilkat blanket in the collection of the University of Alaska Museum of the North, Fairbanks, Alaska

Traditional textiles of Northwest Coast tribes are enjoying a dramatic revival. Chilkat weaving and Ravenstail weaving are regarded as some of the most difficult weaving techniques in the world. A single Chilkat blanket can take an entire year to weave. In both techniques, dog, mountain goat, or sheep wool and shredded cedar bark are combined to create textiles featuring curvilinear formline designs. Tlingit weaver Jennie Thlunaut (1892–1986) was instrumental in this revival.

Button blankets are wool blankets embellished with mother-of-pearl buttons worn on significant occasions, such as potlatches.

=== Northeastern Woodlands ===
Great Lakes and Prairie tribes are known for their ribbonwork, found on clothing and blankets. Strips of silk ribbons are cut and appliquéd in layers, creating designs defined by negative space. The colors and designs might reflect the clan or gender of the wearer. Powwow and other dance regalia from these tribes often feature ribbonwork. These tribes are also known for their fingerwoven sashes.

=== Southeastern Woodlands ===
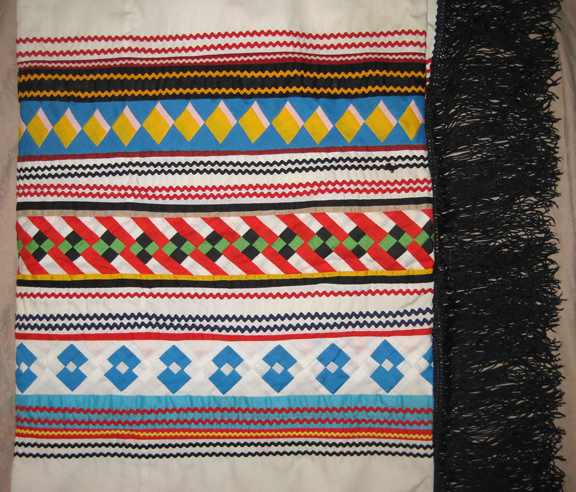
Seminole patchwork shawl made by Susie Cypress from Big Cypress Indian Reservation, c. 1980s

Pieces of 7,000- to 8,000-year-old fabric have been found with human burials at the Windover Archaeological Site in Florida. The burials were in a peat pond. The fabric had turned into peat, but was still identifiable. Many bodies at the site had been wrapped in fabric before burial. Eighty-seven pieces of fabric were found associated with 37 burials. Researchers have identified seven different weaves in the fabric. One kind of fabric had 26 strands per inch (10 strands per centimeter). There were also weaves using two-strand and three-strand wefts. A round bag made from twine was found, as well as matting. The yarn was probably made from palm leaves. Cabbage palm, saw palmetto and scrub palmetto are all common in the area, and would have been so 8,000 years ago.

Seminole seamstresses, upon gaining access to sewing machines in the late 19th century and early 20th centuries, invented an elaborate appliqué patchwork tradition. Seminole patchwork, for which the tribe is known today, came into full flower in the 1920s.

=== Southern Cone ===
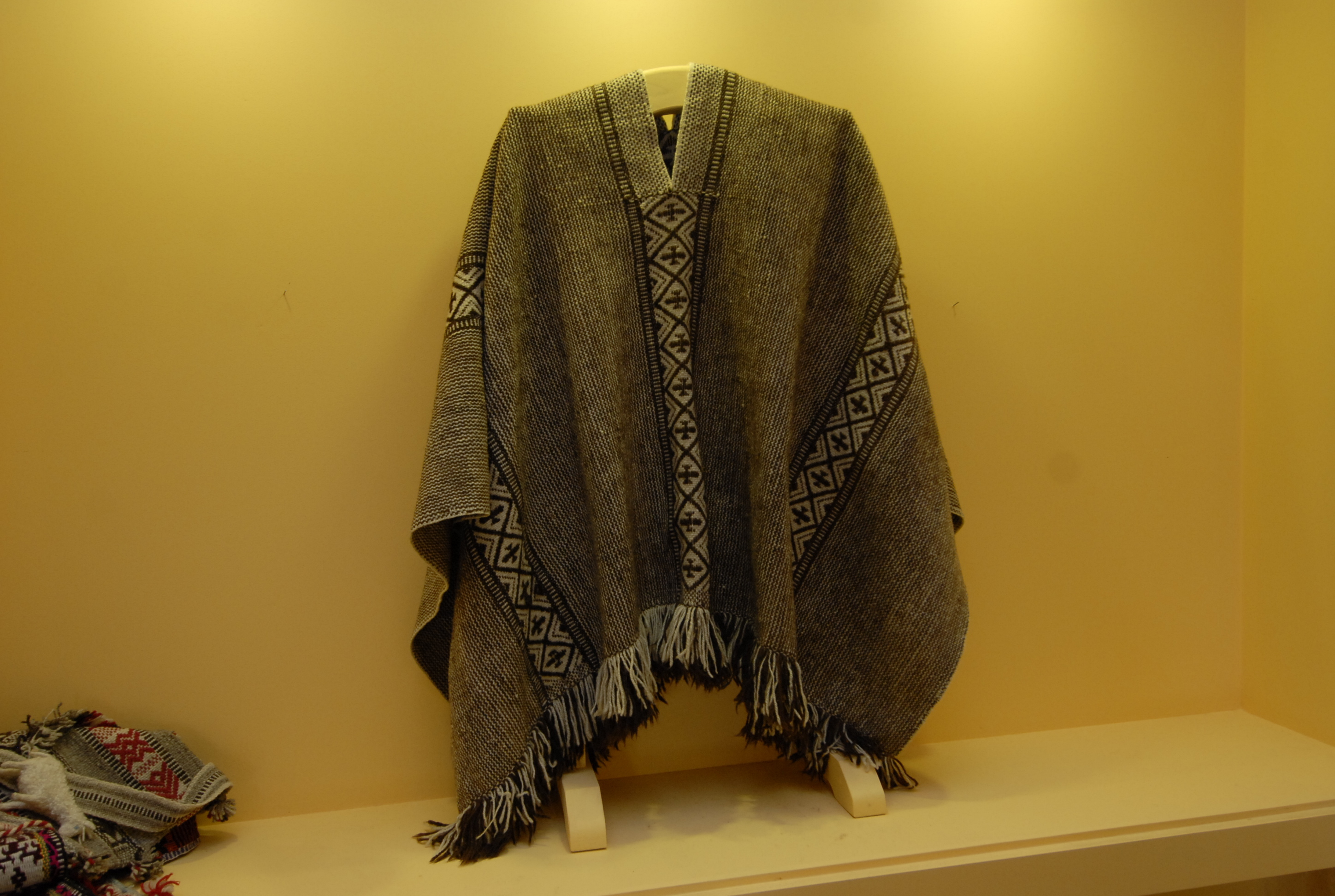
Traditional Mapuche poncho exhibited in Museo Artesanía Chilena.

Mapuche women engaged in the practice of weaving textiles and ponchos by using the wool of llamas and alpacas before replacing them with sheep after the Spanish colonists introduced them.

== See also ==
- Indigenous textile artists of the Americas
- Visual arts by indigenous peoples of the Americas
- Native American fashion
- Amauti
- Anorak
- Aztec clothing
- Bustle (regalia)
- Huipil
- Inuit clothing
- Mukluk
- Ñandutí
- Petate
- Piteado
- Quillwork
- Roach (headdress)
- Ruana
- War bonnet
