= Margaret Wood (fashion designer) =

Navajo/Seminole fiber artist (born 1950)

- Born: 1950 (age 75–76); Parker, Arizona
- Citizenship: American
- Occupations: fiber artist, fashion designer, quilt maker
- Years active: 1971–present

Margaret Wood (born 1950) is a Navajo-Seminole fiber artist, fashion designer, and quilt maker. Though she began her career as a teacher and librarian, Wood switched to fiber arts to allow her to express her creativity. She published Native American Fashion: Modern Adaptations of Traditional Designs, which for four decades was the only book focused on traditional native clothing and how it was modified in contemporary design. From 1990, Wood primarily became a quilter, displaying her works at numerous featured exhibitions throughout the United States, including such venues as the American Craft Museum in Manhattan; the Heard Museum of Phoenix, Arizona; the Riverside Metropolitan Museum of Riverside, California and the Wheelwright Museum of the American Indian of Santa Fe, New Mexico, among many others.

== Early life ==
Margaret Wood was born in 1950 in Parker, Arizona to Helen Mae (née Watchman) and Charlie Wood. Her mother was a Navajo and her father was Oklahoma Seminole. Her mother was raised at Fort Defiance on the Navajo Nation, and became a teacher in Poston and later in Tuba City. Her father grew up in Oklahoma as part of the Seminole Nation of Oklahoma and was a carpenter. She learned to sew from her mother when she was about nine years old.Completing her secondary schooling, Wood attended Arizona State University on a full scholarship from the Navajo Nation. She graduated with a bachelor's degree in education in 1971. She obtained a master's degree in library science from the University of Denver in 1973.

== Career ==
Wood began her career as a teacher immediately upon earning her degree, but after a year continued with graduate studies at the University of Denver. She earned a master's degree in library science with a thesis A Survey of Library Services Available to Navajo People on the Navajo Reservation in 1973 and that year began working as the librarian of the Navajo Community College in Tsaile, Arizona. She then worked Phoenix Public Library for two years, married, and began writing Native American Fashion: Modern Adaptations of Traditional Designs.

Her book offered information on traditional garments and gave examples for how those could be refashioned as contemporary designs, using photographs of traditional dress and drawings illustrating the modifications. The book was organized into geographic regions and she included a broad sampling of styles. She also explored how contemporary fashion could be modified to reflect the current trend to celebrate Native pride.

In 1978 after five years of working as a librarian, Wood decided to change direction and focus her attention on fiber arts and finding a publisher for her book. She decided to remain at home, when her son was born in 1979 and began sewing. The book, Native American Fashion, was finally published in 1981 and for over four decades was the only work to focus exclusively on contemporary Native American fashion. That same year, she launched Native American Fashions, Inc. and spent the next decade focused on fashion. She participated in numerous fashion shows and exhibitions that highlighted her work,.

In 1984, while attending the Annual Heard show, Wood was uninspired by the quilts entered and decided to try to design one. She entered her first attempt in the 1985 show, earning an honorable mention. She began studying the art of quiltmaking, including the fabrics to use and various techniques, like applique, mola and trapunto. Until 1990, Wood considered herself to be a fashion designer who quilted, but that year, she began to focus on quilting, as it allowed her more freedom for creative expression.

Wood often works in series. Her first designs were geometric patterns found of basketry, beadwork, and in Navajo weaving. She later expanded her work to include more personal stories, interpreting the difficulty experienced by Native Americans of having to live in two cultures and biographical works focused on her family members. The quilts she designed for her father and mother, featured maze designs and different iconography to represent significant moments in each of their histories as they journeyed through their lives. Some of her groups, like The Bag Series are more like fabric sculptures. This series focused on various types of containers used by Native Americans and featured bags of varying sizes.

Wood's work has been widely exhibited in various museums. She has been an invited participant to Expressions of Spirit: Contemporary American Indian Art at the Wheelwright (1995); Native American Quilts from the Southwest: Tradition, Creativity, and Inspiration at the Institute of American Indian Arts (1998–1999); Head, Heart and Hands: Native American Craft Traditions in a Contemporary World at the Kentucky Museum of Art and Craft of Louisville and the Museum of Art in DeLand, Florida (1998); Changing Hands: Art without Reservation at the American Craft Museum in Manhattan (2002) and the New Mexico Museum of Art in Santa Fe (2003); Native Quilters of the Southwest at the Navajo Nation Museum (2005); and Quilt Stories at the Riverside Metropolitan Museum of Riverside, California (2008–2009), among many others.
