= Dolores Gonzales =

Mexican-American fashion designer (1907-1994)

- Born: Dolores Consuelo Barcelo; June 6, 1907; Sonora, Mexico
- Died: July 1994 (aged 86–87); California, U.S.
- Known for: Fashion designer
- Movement: Regionalism
- Patrons: Pat Nixon, Lynda Bird, and Luci Baines

Dolores Consuelo Barcelo Gonzales (June 6, 1907– 1994) was a Mexican–American fashion designer based in Tucson, Arizona. She is best known for blending Native American and Mexican clothing traditions to develop distinctive southwest resort wear dresses known as fiesta dresses (also known among other names as the pejorative squaw dress). She founded the company Dolores Resort Wear that manufactured dresses for the American market, selling in upscale department stores across the country. The iconic design was appropriated and copied by other designers throughout the southwest becoming synonymous with mid-twentieth century regionalist fashion of the American Southwest. The dress design became the official dress of the American Square-dancing movement.

== Life ==
Born Dolores Consuelo Barcelo in the northern Mexican state of Sonora on June 6, 1907, to Father Helberto Barcelo and Mother Beatrice Barcelo. She immigrated to Douglas, Arizona with her family in 1911 fleeing the civil unrest created by the Mexican Revolution.

She moved to Los Angeles in 1920 and began working at Phiffer's, where she assisted the designers in selecting colors, trimmings and fabrics. She worked there for 17 years,. In 1929, she married Leo Gonzales. The Gonzales family moved to Tucson in 1938. Gonzales' sister, Maria, opened her own dress shop, called Irene Page. Although Irene Page made ladies' ready-to-wear at first, Maria Gonzales began to experiment with the style of broomstick skirts.

Gonzales and her brother Richard Barcelo brought Irene Page after World War II when Maria married and moved out of state. In 1941, the store began to make their own dresses and it was also renamed the Dolores Shop. All of Gonzales's dresses were made in a converted house – factory on West Council Street. In 1954, the Arizona Daily Star reported that Gonzales' factory created 60 dresses a day. In 1962, Barcelo convinced Gonzales to close her shop, seeing an end to the trend in fiesta dresses.

According to Dolores's Son Lee Gondolas, the store, called the Dolores Shop received orders from all over the world. Dolores also had market outlets in Los Angeles, Chicago, St. Louis and New York. In 1956, a Los Angeles Times Reporter dubbed her "The Dior of the Desert." Major department stores sent buyers to the Dolores Shop to purchase dresses that sold for $100 to $300 ($1,200 to $3,600 in 2025 dollars). J.C. Penney wanted to sell her dressing in their stores, but Gonzales refused. Famous individuals, such as Mamie Eisenhower, Pat Nixon and Cyd Charisse were known to have bought Gonzales' dresses.

Gonzales died in July 1994 in California.

== See also ==
- Native American fashion
- Squaw dress

== Bibliography ==
- Bernice Cosulich, "American Indians Were First Designers and Tailors, Fashioning Fine Clothing." Arizona Daily Star (Tucson), March 14, 1948, p. D1
- Dolores Resort Wear, Dior of the Desert, Tucson Modernism Week, October 2015
