= Geraldine M. Sherman =

Native American fashion designer

Geraldine Sherman
- Born: Geraldine Mae Sherman; September 8, 1922; Kyle, South Dakota, U.S.
- Died: November 4, 2012 (aged 90); Rapid City, South Dakota, U.S.
- Education: Oglala Community School

Geraldine Mae Sherman (1922–2012) was an American fashion designer of Native American descent, known for creating pieces inspired by the Lakota traditions of the Pine Ridge Indian Reservation in South Dakota. With the assistance of the Moroccan-born anthropologist Helene Hagan, she established the pioneering Contemporary Lakota Fashions, which produced, exhibited and marketed a variety of garments from the mid-1980s.

== Biography ==
Born on September 8, 1922, near Kyle, South Dakota, Geraldine Mae Sherman was the fourth of the seven children of William Sherman and his wife Victoria, née Hunter. Brought up on the Indian reservation, she graduated from Oglala Community School in Pine Ridge in 1940.

In 1947, she married Calvin T. Cutschall with whom she had several children, mainly after they settled in Rapid City, South Dakota. They divorced in the early 1970s. As a result of her contacts with the St. Isaac Jogues Church in Rapid City, she presented items of women's clothing at exhibitions arranged by the Mahpiya Luta Club in the late 1966s, winning first prize two years in succession.

Thanks to the support and encouragement of the psychologist and anthropologist Helene Hagan, she developed a collection of Lakota fashions which she marketed through her establishment Contemporary Lakota Fashions. In addition to women's clothing, she designed items for clergy-members, including for Pope John Paul II.

Sherman died on November 4, 2012, in Rapid City.
