= Azalea Thorpe =

American weaver and textile designer (1911–1988)

- 1961
- Born: Azalea Stuart Gray; 10 April 1911; Peebles, Scotland
- Died: 29 December 1988 (aged 77); Santa Fe, New Mexico
- Other names: Azalea Stuart Thorpe, Azalea Thorpe New
- Occupations: fashion designer, weaver
- Years active: 1953–1970

Azalea Thorpe (10 April 1911 – 29 December 1988) was a Scottish-born American weaver and textile designer. Known for her innovative experimentation with both natural and synthetic materials, Thorpe was a featured instructor and lecturer throughout the United States. She has weavings in the permanent collection of the Victoria and Albert Museum. An annual award given in her honor is presented by the Institute of American Indian Arts for fiber arts.

== Early life ==
Azalea Stuart Gray was born on 10 April 1911 in Peebles, Scotland to Marion R. "May" and Andrew Gray. She immigrated in 1916, with her mother to the United States, joining their father in Flint, Michigan, where he was employed as a machinist in an automobile plant. After the family's arrival, another daughter, Marcia, was born. The girls attended public schools in Flint and at the age of eighteen, Gray was working in the automobile industry. By the mid-1930s, she had married Alfred E. Thorpe, moved to Ohio and in 1937, the couple had their daughter, Sheila. After Thorpe divorced, she moved to Europe, where she traveled extensively and studied French for eighteen months. Returning to the United States, she enrolled in a textile design course at Cranbrook Academy of Art in Bloomfield Hills, Michigan, studying with Marianne Strengell.

== Career ==
Upon her graduation from Cranbrook, Thorpe began teaching weaving techniques and by 1953, was conducting a speaking tour with exhibits on weaving. After several years of teaching at Cranbrook, she moved to Deer Isle, Maine, where she taught at the Haystack Mountain School of Crafts before moving to New York City around 1953. In New York, Thorpe opened a design studio in Manhattan at 10th Avenue and 57th Street, where she experimented with a range of both natural and synthetic fibers. She continued with her own education at the Scottish Woollen Technical College in Galashiels, Scotland and taught at the Fashion Institute of Technology in the 1950s.

Thorpe was interested in textile manufacture for both industrial and home use. She designed fabrics for use in coats, drapery, rugs, and wall coverings as well as a special fabric for use with speakers which would not distort the transmission of sound. She participated as a technical advisor, along with Jack Lenor Larsen and Russel Wright, to the International Cooperation Administration. She was interested in varied dyeing techniques and conducted in-depth research on new types of materials, such as the natural protein fiber Vicara and corn fiber to determine its adaptability for both design and manufacture. Her research was conducted as a collaboration with the architect Kent Cooper. Displaying her work at craft fairs and exhibitions, in varied locations like Texas and Florida, she also juried events for the National Conference of American Craftsmen and the annual International Women's Exhibition, among others.

In addition to her design work, Thorpe, who was a jazz enthusiast, wrote as a columnist at Downbeat Magazine. Meeting many of the noted musicians in the field, she worked as a personal manager for such artists as the De Paris Brothers, Sidney and Wilbur; Miles Davis; and Abbey Lincoln. She exhibited works at the Brussels World Fair in 1958 and toured Europe with the United States Information Service Exhibit. Her works were featured in major museum collections, such as a 1954 weaving in the permanent holdings of the Victoria and Albert Museum. In 1960, she was part of a New York State Education Department television series Adventures in Art where she discussed weaving.

In 1962, Thorpe moved to Santa Fe, New Mexico and began teaching weaving at the newly founded Institute of American Indian Arts (IAIA). (Note: Jessica Metcalf identifies Thorpe as Cherokee in her thesis on Native American fashion designers. No other documentation indicates that she had Cherokee heritage, though her second husband was Cherokee.) She served as the chair of the fiber and textile arts department of IAIA, but continued to work on research projects in New York, like a 1964 study of South and Central American textiles. On 11 November 1966, Thorpe married Lloyd Kiva New, a Cherokee fashion designer.

Thorpe left the IAIA in 1966, returning east to conduct seminars and study Southeastern weaving techniques. She published articles on the school and in 1967, co-authored the book Elements of Weaving with Jack Lenor Larsen and the following year returned as head of the fiber department at IAIA. In 1969, she designed the paraments for the Bethlehem Lutheran Church in Los Alamos, New Mexico. The initial hanging representing the Trinity was woven in browns, greens and rust hues. Additional hangings in red for Pentecost, violet for Advent and Lent, and a third in white for Christmas and Easter were also commissioned. That same year, she published a review of the exhibit Young Americans 1969, stressing that weaving was able to be both art and craft.

== Death and legacy ==
Thorpe died on 29 December 1988 at her home in Santa Fe, New Mexico, after a lengthy illness with cancer. The Institute of American Indian Arts established the Azalea Thorpe New Memorial Award in her honor to recognize excellence in fiber arts.

== Selected works ==
- Thorpe, Azalea (21 September 1955). "Exciting Detroit Bash". DownBeat. Chicago, Illinois: Maher Publications. ISSN 0012-5768.
- Thorpe, Azalea (July–August 1965). "The American Indian Student: Two Educational Programs—Institute of American Indian Arts, Santa Fe". Craft Horizons. 25 (4). New York, New York: American Craftsmen's Council: 12–13, 40. ISSN 0011-0744.
- Thorpe, Azalea (January–February 1966). "Schubert's Shards". Craft Horizons. 26 (1). New York, New York: American Craftsmen's Council: 18. ISSN 0011-0744.
- Thorpe, Azalea Stuart; Larsen, Jack Lenor (1967). Elements of weaving: a complete introduction to the art and techniques (Revised (1978) ed.). Garden City, New York: Doubleday. ISBN 978-0-385-12540-6.
- Thorpe, Azalea (July–August 1969). "Young Americans 1969". Craft Horizons. 28 (4). New York, New York: American Craftsmen's Council: 9–14, 52. ISSN 0011-0744.
