= Jessica Metcalfe =

Native American art historian

Jessica Metcalfe is a Native American art historian focused on Native American fashion, educator, author, and owner of Beyond Buckskin Boutique. She is a citizen of the Turtle Mountain Chippewa Tribe in Belcourt, North Dakota.

== Early life and education ==
Metcalfe grew up in Dunseith, North Dakota. Growing up, Metcalfe says racial tensions caused her to avoid wearing clothing that would identify her as Indigenous.

She received her undergraduate degree from Dartmouth College and a PhD from the University of Arizona in American Indian studies.

== Career ==
Metcalfe is an advocate for the "Buy Native" movement, which encourages cross-cultural collaborations with Native designers and purchasing directly from Native artists.

In 2009, Metcalfe created her blog, Beyond Buckskin, to share her research about Native fashion online. She started Beyond Buckskin Boutique in 2012, an online store selling works by Native American fashion designers. In 2016, Beyond Buckskin Boutique expanded with a brick and mortar location on the Turtle Mountain Indian Reservation.

She was a managing editor and writer for Red Ink Magazine, a journal for Indigenous humanities, arts, and literature. She was a visiting professor at Turtle Mountain Community College and the Arizona State University from 2011 to 2012, where she taught Native American studies, studio art, art history, literature, and anthropology.

Metcalfe has presented at numerous national conferences, including the Entrepreneurship and Indigenous Art Conference, the Smithsonian and Museum of Contemporary Native Arts, and co-curated exhibitions. Her current work focuses on Native American art, clothing, and design from the past to modern times, with an emphasis on contemporary artists.

In 2013, Metcalfe organized the Native American fashion show for the Idyllwild Arts Foundation Theatre in Idyllwild, California. That same year, she curated an exhibit on Native fashion at the Museum of Indian Arts and Culture in Santa Fe, New Mexico.

In 2015, she was an advisor for the Peabody Essex Museum's Native Fashion Now exhibit.

== Personal life ==
In 2012, Metcalfe moved to Gardena, North Dakota.
