= Eldena Bear Don't Walk =

American politician and judge

Personal details
- Born: 1973 or 1974 (age 52–53) Missoula, Montana, U.S.
- Education: University of Montana School of Law (MPA, JD); University of Arizona College of Law (LL.M.)
- Occupation: Lawyer, judge

Eldena Bear Don't Walk (born 1973 or 1974 in Missoula, Montana) is an American lawyer, judge and politician. She is an enrolled citizen of the Crow Tribe of Montana and was the first woman to serve as the Chief Justice of that tribal court. She is also a descendant of the Confederated Salish and Kootenai Tribes. She has served as a judge for several other Tribal Courts. She is the chair of the Indian Law section of the State Bar of Montana.

She ran in the 2018 election cycle as a Democrat for an open seat in District 93 in the Montana House of Representatives which is in the Mission Valley and includes part of the Flathead Indian Reservation.

Her father was Urban Bear Don't Walk, who was one of the first Native American lawyers graduating from the University of Montana School of Law in 1975. He founded the Crow Tribal Court. Her mother is the activist and fashion designer Marjorie Bear Don't Walk. Her daughter, Mitchell Rose Bear Don't Walk, known as Rose, is a botanist and one of 24 members of the newly formed Tribal Youth Health Advisory Board to the National Indian Health Board, as well as a host on the YouTube channel SciShow.

Eldena Bear Don't Walk received her Masters in Public Administration (MPA) and Juris Doctor from the University of Montana School of Law. She achieved a master of laws degree (LLM) from the Rogers College of Law, University of Arizona, Tucson, Arizona in 2013.

== See also ==
- List of Native American jurists
