= Marjorie Bear Don't Walk =

American fashion designer

- Born: Marjorie Rose Mitchell; February 27, 1946; Aberdeen, Washington
- Died: July 4, 2026 (aged 80); Dillon, Montana
- Occupations: fashion designer, health care advocate
- Years active: 1968–2026
- Spouse: Urban Bear Don't Walk (m. 1966; died 2018)
- Children: 3, including Eldena Bear Don't Walk

Marjorie Bear Don't Walk (1946 - 2026), born Marjorie Rose Mitchell, was an Ojibwa-Salish health care professional and Native American fashion designer. She is most known as an advocate for reforms in the Indian Health Service, and specifically the care of urban Native Americans. In addition, she is a fashion designer who has targeted career women, designing professional attire which incorporated traditional techniques into her clothing.

== Personal life ==
=== Early life ===
Marjorie Bear Don't Walk, born Marjorie Rose Mitchell, was born in 1946 in Aberdeen, Washington to Jane (Whitworth) and Jack Mitchell. She is an enrolled member of the Confederated Salish and Kootenai Tribe and her heritage includes Chippewa (Michif Ojibwe) ancestry. She grew up with three brothers, Gary, George and Robert, in Dixon (now known as Sčilíp), Hot Springs, Perma, and Ronan, Montana. During their childhood, their mother had tuberculosis, and the children were sent to an American Indian boarding school, which operated as the Ursuline Academy, in St. Ignatius.

=== Adult life ===
After completing her secondary education, Mitchell enrolled at Montana State College, in an era when there were less than 200 indigenous students nationwide participating in university studies. She studied home economics and nutrition, graduating with a Bachelor of Science degree in 1968. In 1966, Mitchell married Urban Bear Don't Walk, a member of the Crow Nation who would go on to found the Crow Tribal Court. The couple subsequently had three children, Urban Jr., Scott and Eldena, who are also enrolled in the Crow tribe.

=== Death ===
Marjorie died at the age of 80 in Dillon, Montana.

== Career ==
Bear Don't Walk served as a nutritionist, and worked as a consultant on vocational and adult education. She participated in tribal, state and national development programs. From the beginning of her career, she advocated for services to Native Americans to be near their own homes. While she recognized that training and employment opportunities might take indigenous people away from their reservations or traditional home lands, she called for culturally-sensitive emotional and health services to be provided where they resided. Bear Don't Walk was one of the activists who pressed the Indian Health Service (IHS) in 1976 to offer health services in urban areas to Native Americans who lived off-reservation. Until the changes were implemented, any tribal member who lived off-reservation for six months, lost their health benefits. In addition to advocacy for indigenous people, she was an outspoken feminist and attended the 1977 National Women's Conference, held as part of the United Nations International Women's Year events. She supported passage of the Equal Rights Amendment, was a member of the Jeannette Rankin Task Force on Equality and was in favor of greater opportunities for Native American women to participate in tribal politics.

While working as a health consultant, Bear Don't Walk developed a line of fashion clothing, designing for professional women for her company Bear Don't Walk Originals. Her designs typically utilized high-end materials and appliqué techniques, decorated with beads, bone, fur, leather, metal or ribbon which combined her heritage with career-oriented styles. Displaying her garments at conferences, she solicited clients from among her colleagues. Much of her business was mail-order and she allowed her customers to provide specific fabrics they desired for their custom designs. Her fashion line included accessories, dresses, and blouses, as well as coats and jackets, with varieties of necklines, hems and sleeve lengths, which reflected popular trends in fashion, but were unique in that they highlighted indigenous themes.

By 1980, Bear Don't Walk had earned a national reputation as a leader in women's rights and health advocacy, and was one of the crucial participants who were responsible for establishing urban centers for the IHS. She began a career as a health administrator working in Denver, Colorado for the American Indian Health Care Association. After two years, she returned to Montana and became the executive director of the Indian Health Board, of Billings, Montana in 1985. In 1992, Bear Don't Walk was one of the people invited to attend the inauguration of President Bill Clinton. After eleven years at the Indian Health Board in Billings, she returned to the Flathead Reservation and worked briefly as the director of the Tribal Health and Human Services agency.

Returning as executive director to the Indian Health Board in Billings, Bear Don't Walk continued her advocacy. In 2006, she protested new changes in government policies for the IHS. The policy required that for native people to take advantage of IHS programs they must be attended at clinics, hospitals and pharmacies run by the IHS. Bear Don't Walk saw these programs as discriminatory and penalizing to urban dwellers who might not have access to reservation services or the ability to pay for travel and out-of-town medical treatment. She pointed out the discrepancies of health funding, noting that the government funds 65% of the medical services at on-reservation facilities, but only 35% of the budget of urban clinics serving indigenous people. In 2012, she secured grants through the Affordable Care Act and expanded services available to urban Indians, adding HIV, pregnancy-prevention and a program to provide pre- and post-natal education training for expectant mothers. She continues to serve at the Indian Health Board and in 2017, her granddaughter, Mitchell Rose Bear Don't Walk, following her family inspiration for advocacy, was appointed to serve on the Tribal Youth Health Advisory Board of the National Indian Health Board.
