= Angela DeMontigny =

Canadian fashion designer

- Occupation: fashion designer
- Label: DeMontigny
- Website: angelademontigny.com

Angela DeMontigny is a native Canadian fashion designer of Cree-Métis heritage. She is known for her use of leather and suede in her clothing and handbags, as well as cultural motifs from her background including fringe, beadwork and cutwork in a style she describes as "indigenous luxury."

== Early life ==
DeMontigny grew up in North Vancouver. In 1991, she moved to Toronto.

== Career ==
DeMontigny first opened a storefront in Vancouver at the age of 24. In 1993, DeMontigny received an Internship Award from the Canadian Council for Aboriginal Business in Toronto that helped start her path in fashion. Inspired by fellow indigenous designers like Dorothy Grant, she began to bring more of her personal heritage into her work and launched her own line in 1995. That year, she moved to Six Nations of the Grand River reserve and started an apparel factory and industrial sewing training program, Spirit Ware and the Factory. DeMontigny also began working more with leather, saying, "I love leather; it's in my DNA. I'm from a line of trappers and furriers."

In 2010, DeMontigny started the first Aboriginal Fashion Week during the Vancouver Winter Olympics. In 2014, she opened her flagship boutique on James Street North in Hamilton, Ontario. DeMontigny has exhibited her collections internationally, including at the 2017 South African fashion week and London Fashion Week 2018. She was appointed the designer-in-residence at the Ryerson School of Fashion. She also speaks about and advocates for indigenous designers and models, producing shows of Aboriginal fashion and serving on the World Indigenous Fashion Council as the Head for North America.

She currently runs a studio for her made-to-order clothing in Hamilton, Ontario. Additionally, DeMontigny has worked in wardrobing for events like the Aboriginal Music Awards and Fashion Television.
