= Loren Aragon =

Native American fashion designer

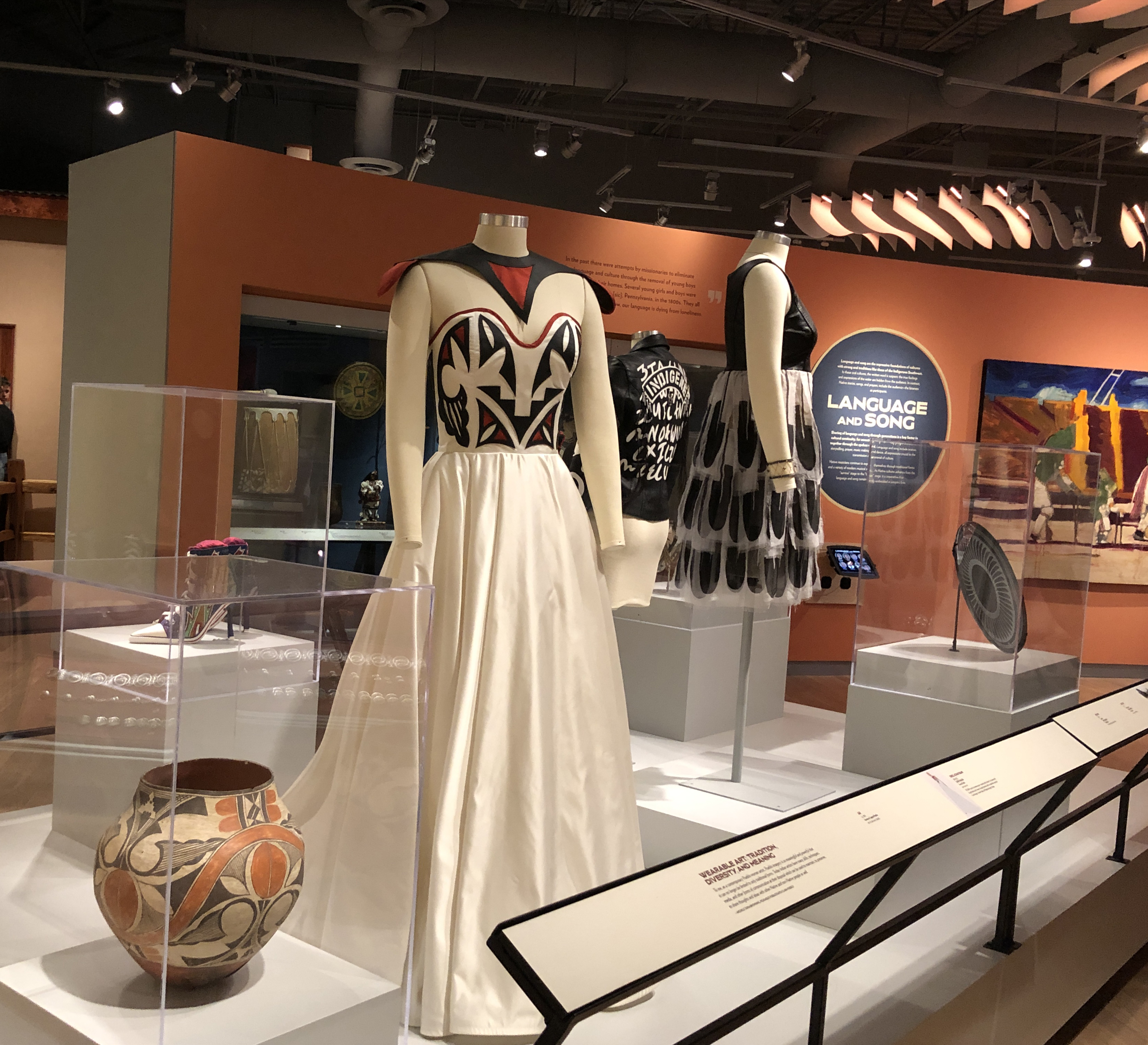
Installation View, Horizons - Weaving Between the Lines with Diné Textiles exhibition at the Museum of Indian Arts + Culture, Loren Aragon dress in foreground

Loren Aragon is a Native American fashion designer from Acoma Pueblo whose work is inspired by Acoma pottery and culture. His ACONAV couture brand is known for its asymmetrical designs, patterns and materials such as silk and leather that blend cultural ideas with modern silhouettes.

== Education ==
In 1998, Aragon moved to Arizona to attend Arizona State University; in 2004 he received a BSE degree in mechanical engineering. While working as an engineer in Phoenix, he taught himself garment construction and fashion design by deconstructing and reverse-engineering dresses. He worked as an engineer for 13 years before becoming a fashion designer.

== Work ==
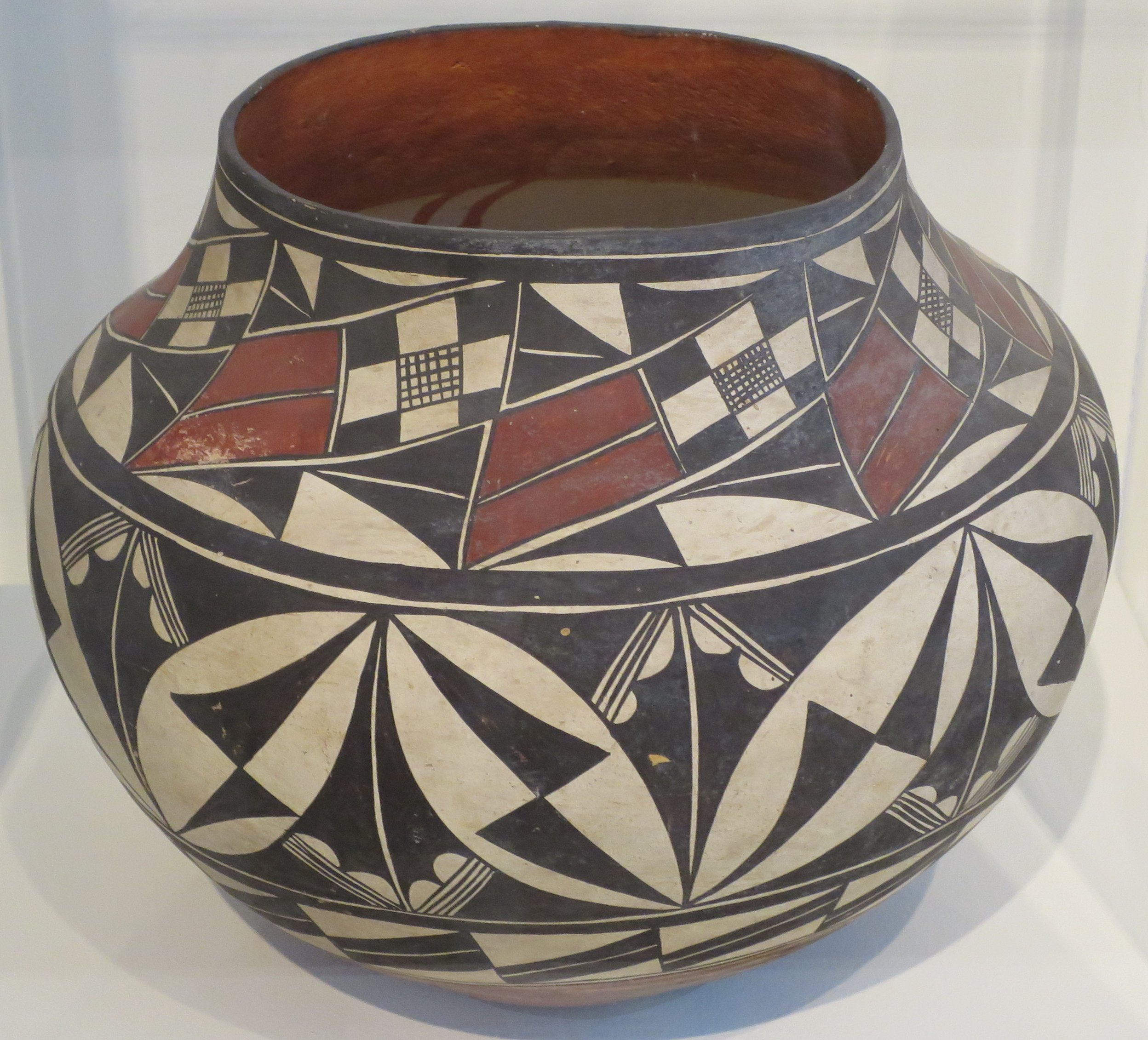
Acoma pottery water jar (ollo), before 1927, Acoma Pueblo. Example of traditional Acoma design.

Aragon grew up observing his mother and aunt create traditional Acoma garments. He began making jewelry, but later, after researching traditional Pueblo designs at the School for Advanced Research in Santa Fe, decided to pursue a career in fabric and fashion design. His garments often incorporate traditional Pueblo elements such as red sashes, manta, and single-shouldered black sash dresses worn at coming of age cultural events when girls are elevated to womenhood.

Aragon's first full collection of 20 pieces premiered in December 2014. He cites Virgil Ortiz and Alexander McQueen as his creative influences. In addition to the runway Aragon has exhibited his fashion designs in art venues including the National Museum of the American Indian, Poeh Museum at Pojoaque Pueblo, the Museum of Indian Arts and Culture, the Phoenix Indian Center, Epcot Center, and other venues.

== Personal life ==
His wife, Valentina, is Diné and is the business partner and operations manager of ACONAV.

== Honors and awards ==
- 2012, Wheelwright Museum of the American Indian
- 2017, Native American Artist Fellowship, Ronald and Susan Dubin Fellowship
- 2018, Couture Designer of the Year, Phoenix Fashion Week

== Collections ==
Aragon's work is in the permanent collection of the School for Advanced Research, Santa Fe, New Mexico and the Museum of Indian Arts + Culture.

== Sources ==
- Holmes, Kelly. Loren Aragon: Five Years Later, Native Max Magazine, Art and Fashion Issue, September/October 2020
- Lengel, Kerry. Meet the Native designer who dressed Arizona’s only Tony Awards voter for the red carpet, AZ Central, May 30, 2019
- Check out Loren Aragon’s Artwork, Voyage Phoenix, February 12, 2019
- ACONAV Founder Loren Aragon on Building a Couture Fashion Brand and Designing for Disney, Native Business Magazine, July 1, 2018
- Rivas, Kyla. Native American couture designer, Loren Aragon, commissioned to design gown for Walt Disney World, Navajo-Hopi Observer, May 24, 2018
- Native fashion designer Loren Aragon’s ACONAV receives Arizona Apparel Foundation scholarship, Tribal Business News, January 23, 2020
- Field, Kimberly.Best of the West: Fashion Visionaries - Loren and Valentina Aragon, Cowboys and Indians Magazine
