= Penny Singer =

Navajo fashion designerand and artist from New Mexico, U.S.

- Born: Teec Nos Pos, Arizona, United States
- Citizenship: Navajo Nation and US
- Education: Institute of American Indian Arts
- Years active: 1999–present
- Known for: Native fashion, textile art, photography
- Children: 1
- Website: pennysinger.com

Penny Singer is a Diné textile artist, photographer, and Native American fashion designer living in New Mexico.

== Biography ==
Penny Singer was born in Teec Nos Pos, Arizona, to Diné parents. They were a military family, and moved every few years. Singer's mother taught her to sew when she was seven. She attended Highland High School in Gilbert, Arizona.

Singer won a scholarship to Haskell Indian Nations University. Her boyfriend needed a ribbon shirt for powwow regalia, so she made one for him. In 1992, Singer transferred the Institute of American Indian Arts to study photography and documentary film. where she studied traditional design techniques, particularly southwest appliqué styles. Singer graduated from college in 1996. After graduating, Singer returned to fashion design, showing her first pieces at Indian Market in 1999. Singer's appliqué grew stronger as she created and used her stencils.

Singer began producing and selling ribbon shirts at markets like the Santa Fe Indian Market. In 2023, they were displayed at the Southwestern Association for Indian Arts Native Fashion Week.

== Work ==
Singer considers her work "wearable art". She makes clothing ranging from dancing regalia to jackets. A 2024 article in Vogue noted that she specializes in handcrafted ribbon shirts. Singer's work combines her artistic media. For example, she will use photographs printed on fabric for patchwork. She uses art by other artists as well, like buttons created by Navajo silversmiths Michael Roanhorse and Jennifer Curtis. Her work draws inspiration from her life and Navajo design.

Singer's work includes jackets, shirts, and purses, but also includes wall hangings, dance regalia, and other clothing.

== Awards ==
This is a partial list of awards:

- 2023: Southwestern Association for Indian Arts, Garments, Second Place
- 2009: Native American Clothing Contest, Honorable Mention
- 2007: Southwestern Association for Indian Arts Fellowship Award
- 2007: Southwestern Association for Indian Arts, Contemporary Clothing, Second Place
- 2007: Southwestern Association for Indian Arts, Native American Clothing Contest, Third Place
- 2005: The 47th Annual Heard Museum Guild Indian Fair & Market, Quilts, Best of Division
- 2004: Native American Clothing Contest, Honorable Mention
