= Patta PT Joest =

Indigenous fashion designer

Patta LT Joest
- Other name: Patta Joest
- Occupation: Fashion designer
- Known for: Indigenous fashion design

Patta PT Joest is a Native American (Choctaw) fashion designer.

== Biography ==
Patta PT Joest studied at Texas Woman's University and transferred to the University of Oklahoma. She attained a bachelor's degree in fashion arts, clothing and textiles in 1982. The "LT" in her name references her maiden name, Lauren Thomas.

Before beginning a career in fashion design, Joest practiced Indigenous beadwork and managed a men's clothing store for 10 years.

== Fashion design ==
Joest is a registered Choctaw artist. Her fashion business, Dancing Rabbit Designs, is based out of Norman, Oklahoma. Joest's fashions have been modeled by the daughters of Wilma Mankiller, former chief of the Cherokee Nation of Oklahoma.

Joest has exhibited her work at many different museums and American Indian arts festivals around the United States. She has been featured at the Santa Fe Indian Market in Santa Fe, New Mexico, the Red Earth Native American Festival in Oklahoma City, Oklahoma, and the Gallup Inter-Tribal Indian Ceremonial in Gallup, New Mexico.

Joest's design work is influenced in part by different Native American tribes and peoples, such as Navajo and Indigenous peoples of the Northeastern Woodlands. She has incorporated Seminole patchwork into her work and other elements of design from the Five Civilized Tribes. Other designs by Joest include hammered silver bras and fur vests with traditional Southeastern Woodlands beadwork.
