= Seminole patchwork =

Indigenous American patchwork technique

Seminole patchwork, referred to by Seminole and Miccosukee women as Taweekaache (design in the Mikasuki language), is a patchwork style made from piecing colorful strips of fabric in horizontal bands. Seminole patchwork garments are often trimmed with a rickrack border. Early examples of this technique are known from photographs in the 1910s, and its use by Seminole women in garment construction began to flourish in the 1920s. Seminole patchwork has historically been an important source of income for many Seminole women, and today remains a source of cultural pride. Fashion designers, including Donna Karan, have been criticized for their appropriation of this patchwork style.

== Gallery ==
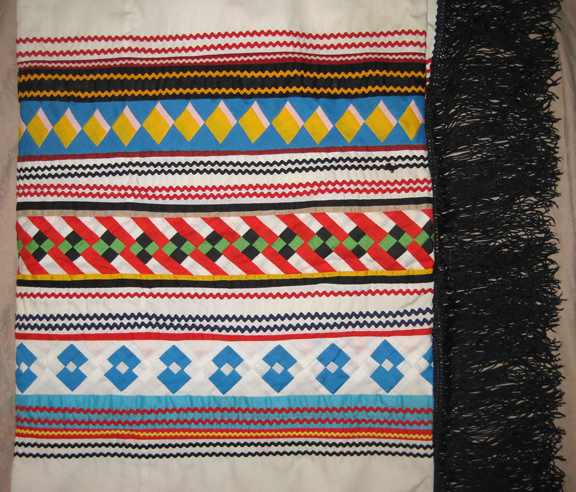
Seminole patchwork fringed dance shawl, ca. 1980s, by Susie Cypress (Seminole Tribe of Florida) from the Big Cypress Reservation, Florida

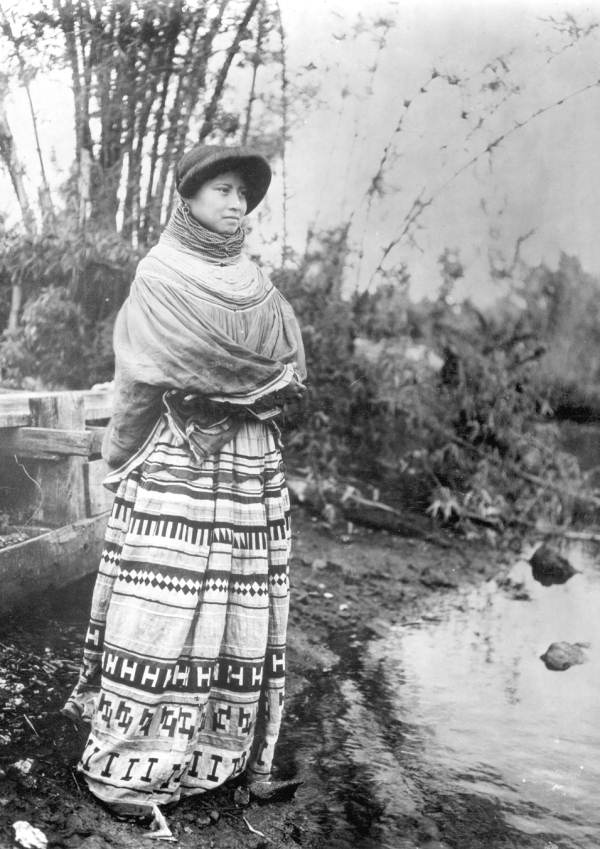
Ruby Jumper Billie, Big Cypress Reservation, Florida

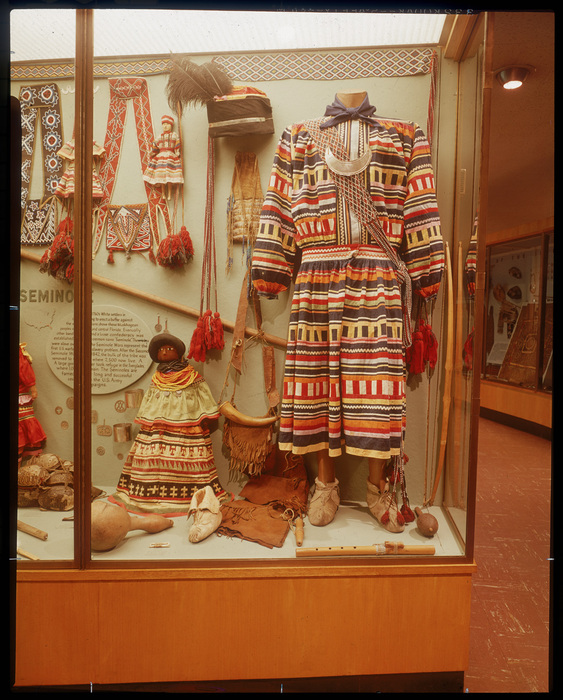
Seminole patchwork in the Museum of the American Indian, ca. 1960

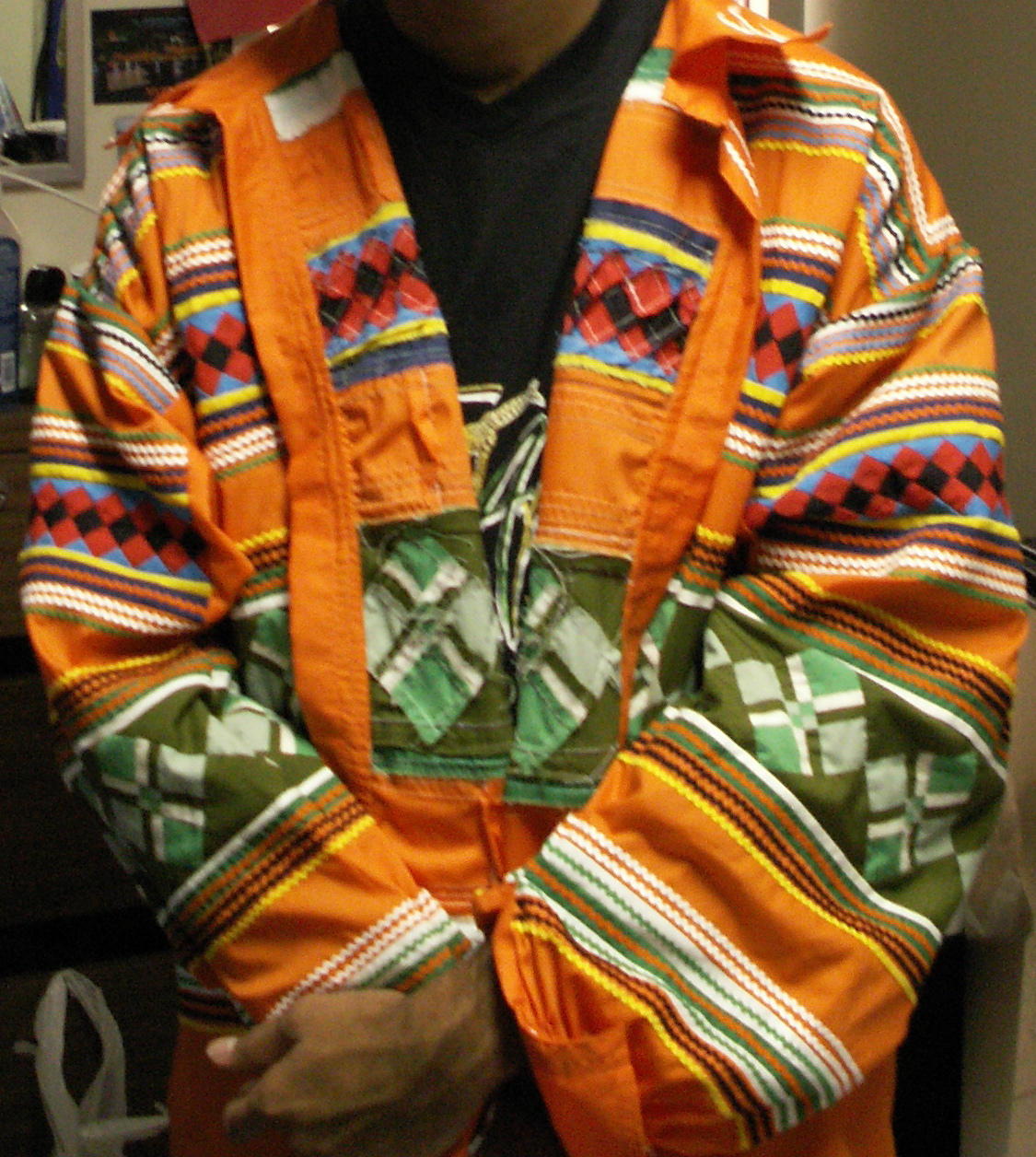
Seminole patchwork jacket worn by Iron Arrow Honor Society members, University of Miami, Coral Gables, Florida
