= Helene Hagan =

American anthropologist

- Born: Helene Coll; 1939 (age 86–87); Rabat, French Morocco
- Education: University of Bordeaux; Stanford University
- Known for: Amazigh activist
- Children: 3
- Scientific career
- Fields: Anthropology

Helene E. Hagan, born Helene Coll (born in 1939), is an American anthropologist and Amazigh activist.

== Biography ==
Hagan immigrated to the United States in 1960. She is the mother of three children. After obtaining a License-es-Lettres from the Faculté des Sciences et des Lettres, University of Bordeaux in France in 1969, she obtained a master's degree in French Literature from Stanford University in 1971. She pursued her doctoral studies in anthropology at Stanford University, California. She is of Berber and Catalan ancestries. Her paternal family name Coll is from the Pyrenees Mountain village of Prats-de-Mollo.

Hagan directed a photo project with elders on the Pine Ridge Indian Reservation, South Dakota, with a grant from the South Dakota Committee on the Humanities, for the benefit of the Archives of the Oglala Lakota Community College from 1983 to 1985, with subsequent showing of the photo exhibit she created in National parks and at the Rotunda, Washington, D.C. She subsequently taught at John F. Kennedy University in California for a number of years, while helping Lakota artists by opening an art gallery "Lakota Contemporary Designs" in Marin county (1985-1990). She was instrumental in the creation of a series of 11 community television programs under the title "Circles" on American Indians in Marin and Sonoma Counties, followed by another series of 15 half-hour episodes on the Amazigh culture of Morocco, which she personally videographed "Tamazgha, Berber land of Morocco." Finally, she initiated and produced six half-hour episodes (The Russell Means Show, 1999-2003), with long-time friend American Indian activist and actor Russell Means as host, taped in Santa Monica for community television.

Hagan has authored numerous articles published in a variety of newspapers and journals. Among these are her well-known article on "Plastic Medicine People" originally published in the Sonoma Press Democrat, and "Apuleius, Amazigh Philosopher" published in The Amazigh Voice, a scholarly journal which also recently published an article of hers titled "The Argan Tree." (2005) She is the author of five books The Shining Ones: An Etymological Essay on the Amazigh Roots of Archaic Egyptian Civilization (2000), Tuareg Jewelry: Traditional Patterns and Symbols (2006), Tazz'unt, Ecology, Ritual and Social Order in the Tessawt Valley of the High Atlas of Morocco" (2011), "Fifty Years in America, A Book of Essays,(2013) and "Russell C. Means The European Ancestry of a Militant Indian" (2017). This last book was followed by a second 2018 edition, titled "Russell Means The European Ancestry of a Militant Indian", which elaborates the historical context of French and Indian intermarriages in early America, during the fur trading era and the bison hunting in the Plains. It also includes a chapter on the public access television series, "The Russell Means Show," which Hagan produced and Means hosted. The first book pioneered the hypothesis of a link between an archaic Egyptian culture, the proto-Berber culture of North Africa, and the Tuareg-Berber cultures of the Sahara desert, focusing on rock art research, archaeology, and comparative linguistics. The second book traces the origins and development of Tuareg (Amazigh) art from rock art to modern jewelry design and production. The third is an anthropological study of a small community of Berber people in the mountains of Morocco, and the fourth an anthology of essays written over several decades on American Indian and Amazigh issues.

Hagan was twice elected and served on the board of directors of the Amazigh Cultural Association in America (A.C.A.A.), between 2002 and 2006. She inherited a large collection of personal papers and unpublished manuscripts of Paul Radin, which she inventoried and deposited in the Special Archives of Marquette University, with the support of a Wenner-Gren Anthropological Grant. She serves as lifetime associate curator for that collection. In 2007, she was one of the professors selected for the First Berber Institute in America, created under an NEH grant at Oregon State University in Corvallis. She introduced participant professors of various universities to the various art forms of North African Amazigh people, including pottery, weaving, jewelry, painting, and cinematography, through a series of seminars. In 2008, she founded the annual Los Angeles Amazigh film Festival, which has presented a variety of films from North Africa.

== Tazzla Institute for Cultural Diversity ==
Hagan is the executive director of the Tazzla Institute for Cultural Diversity, which she founded in 1993. Through the work of the Tazzla Institute, a 501c(3) non-profit organization, she has been able to promote and defend Amazigh culture, rights and identity at the United Nations through a variety of channels, such as "Creating Peace through the Arts and Media," a UNESCO Culture of Peace program, and P.I.P.E (Partnership of Indigenous Peoples for the Environment. The Tazzla Institute is the supporting nonprofit organization for the Los Angeles Amazigh Film Festival, the first film festival in the United States to focus on film content dedicated to the Amazigh world of Berbers and Tuaregs of the vast North African territory called "Tamazgha", which extends from the Oasis of Siwa in Egypt, through Libya, Tunisia, Algeria, Morocco, the Canary Islands, and the Sahara desert to the north of Niger, Mali, and Burkina-Faso.

In 1993, Hagan created the Tazzla Institute for Cultural Diversity (originally the Institute for Archetypal Ethnology) and Amazigh Video Productions, a project of the Institute in Community Service television. Through this project and the Marin 31 channel, she created three series: 11 half-hour programs titled "We're Still Here" on American Indians in Marin County; a second 12-episode series on Amazigh (Berber) culture of Morocco; a third series of 4 one-hour programs on the ecology of the San Francisco Bay, a series for the training of students of the Environmental Forum of Marin. In Los Angeles, and for Adelphia communications in Santa Monica and Eagle Rock, Hagan produced a series hosted by the well-known American Indian Movement leader, author, and actor Russell Means, and several programs in a series titled "Amazigh News" (1998–2006) featuring human rights reports on Morocco, Algeria and on the Tuareg people of Niger and Mali. Also included in that series was a special half-hour program called "Heart of the Sahara" on the Berber-Tuareg artisans of Mali.
