= Lloyd Kiva New =

Cherokee fashion designer and educator (1916–2002)

- Born: Lloyd Henri New; February 18, 1916; Fairland, Oklahoma, U.S.
- Died: February 8, 2002 (aged 85); Santa Fe, New Mexico, U.S.
- Citizenship: Cherokee Nation
- Education: School of the Art Institute of Chicago
- Known for: Native fashion design, Native American studies
- Spouse: Aysen New
- Children: two

Lloyd Henri Kiva New (Cherokee, February 18, 1916 – February 8, 2002) was a pioneer of modern Native American fashion design and a cofounder and president emeritus of the Institute of American Indian Arts (IAIA) in Santa Fe, New Mexico.

== Early life and education ==
New was born Lloyd Henri New on February 18, 1916, in Fairland, Oklahoma. His father William Edward New (1875–1968) was Scots-Irish, and his mother, Josephine Colston New (1875–1955), was full blooded Cherokee. New was the youngest of ten children.

He earned bachelor's and master's degrees in art education from the School of the Art Institute of Chicago (SAIC). After graduating, he taught painting at the Phoenix Indian School in Arizona, and then enlisted in the US Navy in 1941.

== Fashion design ==
New moved to Scottsdale, Arizona, where in 1945 he opened a fashion boutique in the Arizona Craftsmen Court in Scottsdale, Arizona. His label, named Kiva, first focused on leather purses, belts, and hats. In 1948, he expanded to a full clothing line. He collaborated with major Native American artists, including Manfred Susunkewa (Hopi), Charles Loloma (Hopi), and Andrew Van Tsinhajinnie (Navajo). His boutique flourished through the 1940s and 1950s.

When Miss Arizona Lynn Freyse competed for Miss America in 1957, she wore a Kiva New-designed dress. Kiva designs sold to Neiman-Marcus.

== Institute of American Indian Arts ==
Initially, New had envisioned a "design laboratory" that taught young Native American students how to make a living through their arts. This evolved into the Institute of American Indian Arts, which New co-founded with Dr. George Boyce and opened in Santa Fe in 1962. The school, initially a high school and then later a college, was funded by the Bureau of Indian Affairs. New served as the inaugural art director and later president of the school. The purpose of the school was to provide an education which fostered pride in students' indigenous heritage and featured the development of skills designed to improve their economic opportunities. New taught a printed textiles course focused on dying techniques, and Azalea Thorpe, who he would marry in 1966, taught weaving.

"Lloyd 'Kiva' New wanted art to be a larger dialogue, relevant to Native Americans and to people who are not Native American," said Tatiana Lomahaftewa-Singer (Hopi-Choctaw), IAIA curator of collections. "He wanted more pure art than something designed for the market."

== Honors ==
New retired from IAIA in 1978, but served as president emeritus. The American Craft Council declared him an honorary fellow in 1976, and the city of Santa Fe declared him a "Living Treasure" in 1989. He was an adviser to the National Museum of the American Indian. The Art Institute of Chicago bestowed an honorary doctorate upon him in 2000.

== Death ==
New died of heart failure on February 8, 2002. He was survived by his two children from his first marriage, his grandchildren, and his wife, Aysen New.

== Exhibits ==
This is a list of select exhibitions.

- 1952 – Atlantic City's Second Annual Fashion Show, Atlantic City, New Jersey
- 2016 – Lloyd Kiva New: Art Design and Influence, Museum of Contemporary Native Arts, Santa Fe, New Mexico
- 2016 –A New Century: The Life and Legacy of Cherokee Artist and Educator Lloyd 'Kiva' New, Museum of Indian Arts and Culture, Santa Fe, New Mexico
- 2016 – Finding a Contemporary Voice: the Legacy of Lloyd Kiva New and IAIA, New Mexico Museum of Art, Santa Fe, New Mexico

== Collections ==
- Fred Jones Jr. Museum of Art, Norman, Oklahoma
- Institute of American Indian Arts, Santa Fe, New Mexico
- Museum of Modern Art, New York City, New York
