= Roach (headdress) =

Native American traditional headdress

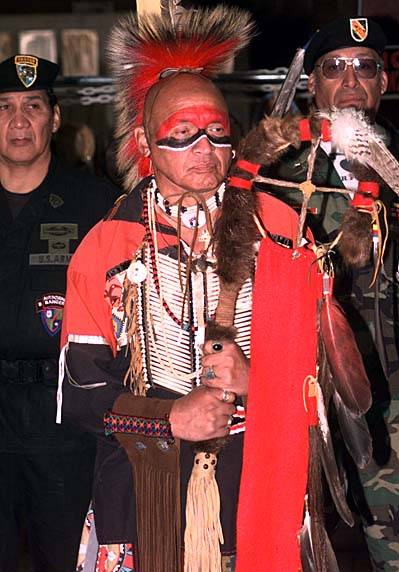
Hair roach headdress

Porcupine hair roaches are a traditional male headdress of a number of Native American tribes in what is now New England, the Great Lakes and Missouri River regions, including the Potawatomi who lived where Chicago now stands. They were and still are most often worn by dancers at pow wows as regalia.

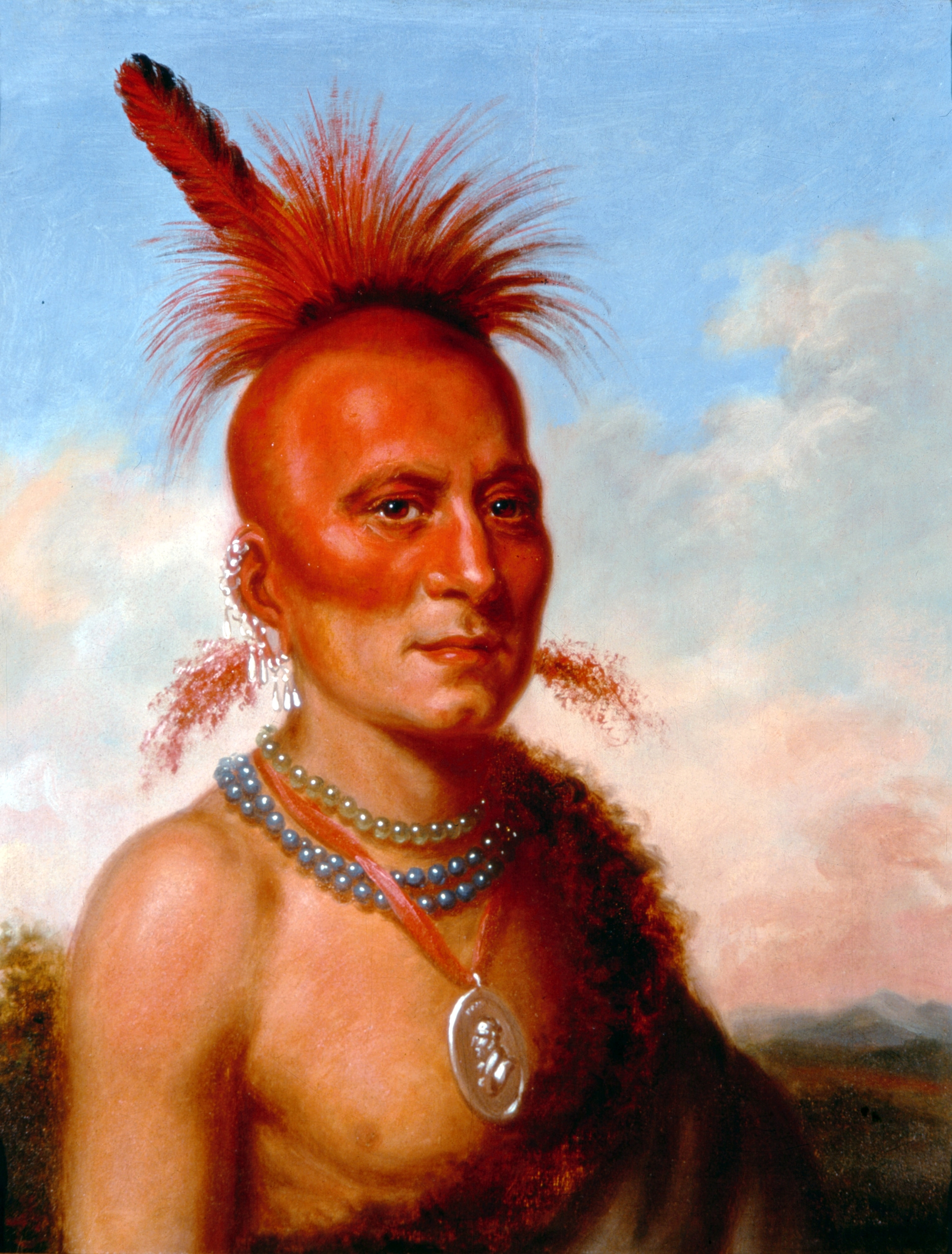
1822 portrait of Sharitahrish, Pawnee chief

The porcupine hair roach is often made of guard hair of the porcupine, the tail hair of the white-tail deer, moose hair, or artificial stiff hair; often the hair is dyed a bright color, such as red or yellow, which can symbolize a veteran of combat. Some roaches from the southern plains are made with black turkey beards.

The term roach also applies to the traditional Mohawk hairstyle worn by some warriors of some southern plains tribes such as the Pawnee, Kiowa, and some Algonquian tribes, such as the Mohegan and Lenape. This is where their hair is shorn like a horse’s mane which was considered stylish in the 19th century. All their hair would be cut, save a strip down the middle of their head.

Present day, most roaches have evolved into separate headdresses. They are made from turkey beard hair, porcupine guard hair and deer-tail hair. Depending on where a tribe is from can determine what their headdress will look like. Typically, central and southern plains style their roaches with the front hairs standing straight up with only a gradual outward flare and are usually smaller in size. The northern plains style hair roach headdress typically have the hairs in front form horizontally outward and tend to be larger in size. Often, men would add bits of animal hair to the headdresses.

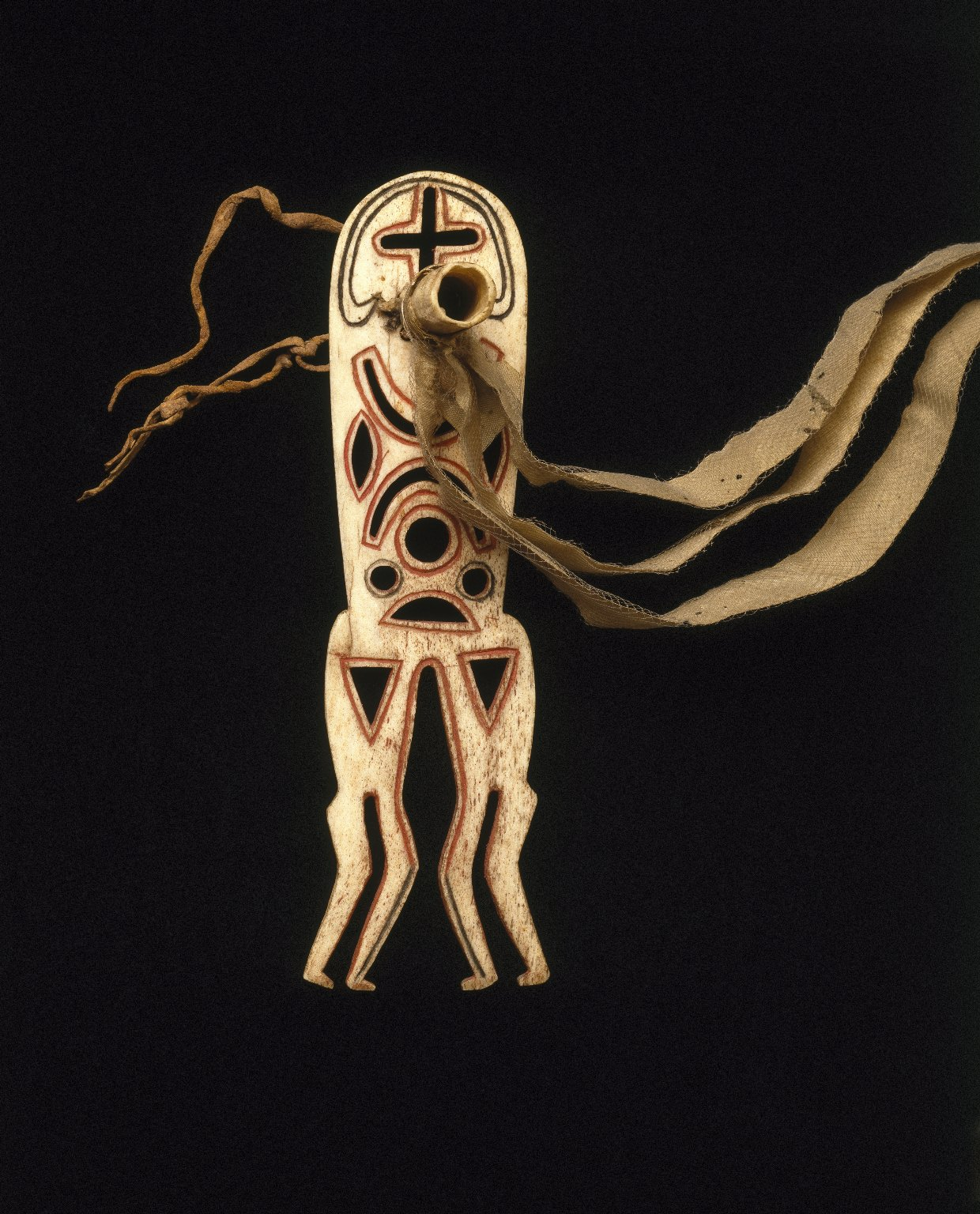
Roach Spreader, early 19th century, Brooklyn Museum
