= America's Most Endangered Places =

List by the U.S. National Trust for Historic Preservation

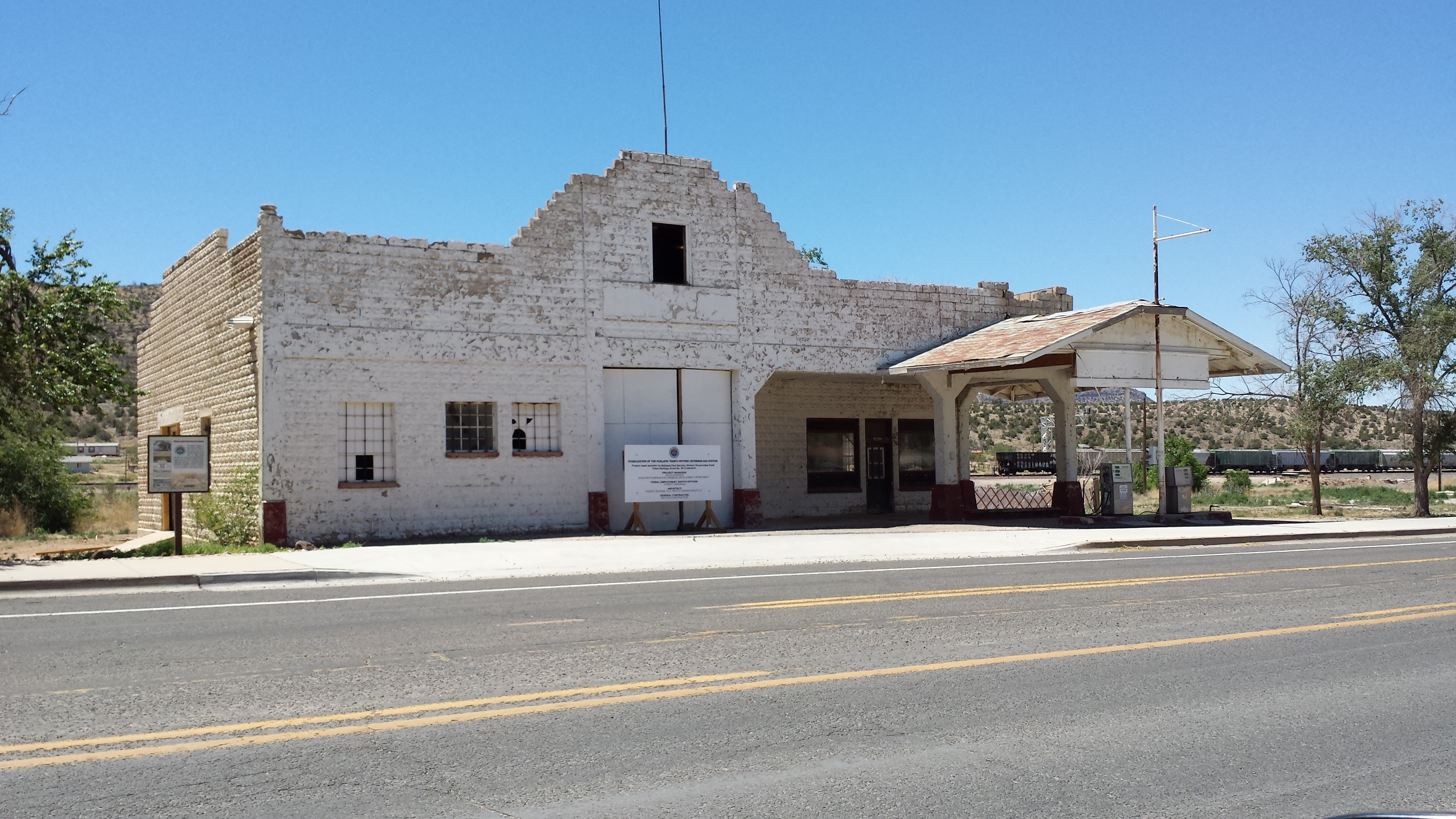
The John Osterman Gas Station in Peach Springs, Arizona, included on the 2023 list

America's 11 Most Endangered Places or America's 11 Most Endangered Historic Places is an annual list of places in the United States that the National Trust for Historic Preservation considers the most endangered. It aims to inspire Americans to preserve examples of architectural and cultural heritage that could be "relegated to the dustbins of history" without intervention.

Many of the locations listed by the Trust have been preserved. However, there have been notable losses, such as 2 Columbus Circle, which underwent significant renovations, and the original Guthrie Theater, demolition of which was completed in early 2007.

First released in 1988, the number of sites included on the list has varied, with the most recent lists settling on 11.

== 2026 places ==
On May 20, 2026, the National Trust announced its annual list of 11 most endangered historic places:

- Ben Moore Hotel, Montgomery, Alabama
- Tule Lake Segregation Center, Modoc County, California
- Angel Island Immigration Station, Tiburon, California
- Swansea Friends Meeting House, Somerset, Massachusetts
- Detroit Association of Women's Clubs Building, Detroit, Michigan
- Greater Chaco Cultural landscape, New Mexico, Colorado, Arizona and Utah
- Women's Rights National Historical Park, Seneca Falls, New York
- Stonewall National Monument, New York City, New York
- The President's House Site, Philadelphia, Pennsylvania
- Hanging Rock Revolutionary War Battlefield, Heath Springs, South Carolina
- El Corazón Sagrado de la Iglesia de Jesús, Ruidosa, Texas

== 2025 places ==
The National Trust announced its annual list of 11 most endangered historic places on May 7, 2025:

- Cedar Key, Florida
- French Broad and Swannanoa River Corridors, Western North Carolina
- Hotel Casa Blanca, Idlewild, Michigan
- May Hicks Curtis House, Flagstaff, Arizona
- Mystery Castle, Phoenix, Arizona
- Oregon Caves Chateau, Cave Junction, Oregon
- Pamunkey Indian Reservation, King William, Virginia
- San Juan Hotel, San Juan, Texas
- Terminal Island Japanese American Tuna Street Buildings, Los Angeles, California
- The Turtle, Niagara Falls, New York
- The Wellington, Pine Hill, New York

== 2024 places ==
On May 1, 2024, the National Trust announced its annual list of 11 most endangered historic places:

- Cindy Walker House, Mexia, Texas
- Eatonville, Florida
- Estate Whim Museum, Frederiksted, St. Croix, U.S. Virgin Islands
- Hudson–Athens Lighthouse, Athens, New York
- Little Tokyo, Los Angeles, California
- Minute Man National Historical Park, Walden, and Nearby Landmarks, Massachusetts
- New Salem Baptist Church, Tams, West Virginia
- Roosevelt High School, Gary, Indiana
- Sitka Tlingit Clan Houses, Sitka, Alaska
- Tangier American Legation, Tangier, Morocco
- Wilderness Battlefield Area, Orange County, Virginia

== 2023 places ==
On May 9, 2023, the National Trust announced its annual list of 11 most endangered historic places:

- Osterman Gas Station, Peach Springs, Arizona
- Little Santo Domingo, Miami, Florida
- Pierce Chapel African Cemetery, Midland, Georgia
- Century and Consumers Buildings, Chicago, Illinois
- West Bank of St. John the Baptist Parish, Louisiana
- Holy Aid and Comfort Spiritual Church (aka Perseverance Benevolent and Mutual Aid Society Hall), New Orleans, Louisiana
- L.V. Hull Home and Studio, Kosciusko, Mississippi
- Henry Ossawa Tanner House, Philadelphia, Pennsylvania
- Philadelphia Chinatown, Philadelphia, Pennsylvania
- Charleston’s Historic Neighborhoods, Charleston, South Carolina
- Seattle Chinatown-International District, Seattle, Washington

== 2022 places ==
On May 4, 2022, the National Trust announced its annual list of 11 most endangered historic places:

- Brooks-Park Home and Studios, East Hampton, New York
- Brown Chapel AME Church, Selma, Alabama
- Camp Naco, Naco, Arizona
- Chicano/a/x Community Murals of Colorado
- The Deborah Chapel, Hartford, Connecticut
- Francisco Q. Sanchez Elementary School, Humåtak, Guam
- Jamestown, Virginia
- Minidoka National Historic Site, Jerome, Idaho
- Olivewood Cemetery, Houston, Texas
- Palmer Memorial Institute, Sedalia, North Carolina
- Picture Cave, Warren County, Missouri

== 2021 places ==
On June 3, 2021, the National Trust announced its annual list of 11 most endangered places:

- Selma to Montgomery March Camp Sites, Selma, Alabama
- Trujillo Adobe, Riverside, California
- Summit Tunnels 6 & 7 and Summit Camp Site, Truckee, California
- Georgia B. Williams Nursing Home, Camilla, Georgia
- Morningstar Tabernacle No.88 Order of Moses Cemetery and Hall, Cabin John, Maryland
- Boston Harbor Islands, Boston, Massachusetts
- Sarah E. Ray House, Detroit, Michigan
- The Riverside Hotel, Clarksdale, Mississippi
- Threatt Filling Station and Family Farm, Luther, Oklahoma
- Oljato Trading Post, San Juan County, Utah
- Pine Grove Elementary School, Cumberland, Virginia

== 2020 places ==
On September 24, 2020, the National Trust announced its annual list of 11 most endangered places:

- Alazan-Apache Courts, San Antonio, Texas
- Hall of Waters, Excelsior Springs, Missouri
- Harada House, Riverside, California
- National Negro Opera Company House, Pittsburgh, Pennsylvania
- Ponce Historic Zone, Ponce, Puerto Rico
- Rassawek, Columbia, Virginia
- Roberts Temple Church of God in Christ, Chicago, Illinois
- Sun-n-Sand Motor Hotel, Jackson, Mississippi
- Terrace Plaza Hotel, Cincinnati, Ohio
- West Berkeley Shellmound and Village Site, Berkeley, California
- Yates Memorial Hospital, Ketchikan, Alaska

== 2019 places ==
On May 30, 2019, the National Trust announced its annual list of 11 most endangered places:

- Ancestral Places of Southeast Utah
- Bismarck-Mandan Rail Bridge in Bismarck, North Dakota
- The Excelsior Club in Charlotte, North Carolina
- Hacienda Los Torres in Lares, Puerto Rico, NRHP-listed
- Industrial Trust Company Building (aka "Superman Building") in Providence, Rhode Island
- James R. Thompson Center in Chicago
- Mount Vernon Arsenal and Searcy Hospital in Mount Vernon, Alabama, NRHP-listed
- Nashville's Music Row in Nashville, Tennessee
- National Mall Tidal Basin in Washington, D.C.
- Tenth Street Historic District in Dallas, Texas
- Willert Park Courts in Buffalo, New York

== 2018 places ==
In June 2018, the National Trust announced its list of 11 most endangered places, along with 1 extra site on 'watch status':

- Annapolis City Dock Area in Annapolis, Maryland
- Ashley River Historic District in Charleston County, South Carolina
- Dr. Susan LaFlesche Picotte Memorial Hospital in Walthill, Nebraska
- Hurricane-Damaged Historic Resources of Puerto Rico and the US Virgin Islands
- Isaiah T. Montgomery House in Mound Bayou, Mississippi
- Larimer Square in Denver, Colorado
- Mary and Eliza Freeman Houses in Bridgeport, Connecticut
- Mount Vernon and Piscataway National Park in Mount Vernon, Virginia and Accokeek, Maryland
- Route 66
- Wallace E. Pratt House (Ship on the Desert) in Salt Flat, Texas
- Walkout Schools of Los Angeles, California (including James A. Garfield High School, Theodore Roosevelt High School, Abraham Lincoln High School, Belmont High School, and El Sereno Middle School)
- Four Towns of Vermont's Upper Valley -- Royalton, Sharon, Strafford and Tunbridge, Vermont

== 2017 places ==
For 2017, the National Trust for Historic Preservation marked the 30th anniversary of the "America's Most Endangered Places" program by releasing a list of 11 "Success Stories"—sites that were named to the "Most Endangered" list that were the focus of successful preservation efforts:

- Antietam National Battlefield in Sharpsburg, Maryland (listed 1988)
- Penn School (now Penn Center) in Frogmore, South Carolina (listed 1990)
- "Historic Boston Theaters" in Boston, Massachusetts (collectively referring to the Boston Opera House, the Paramount Theatre, and Modern Theatre) (listed 1995)
- Little Rock Central High School in Little Rock, Arkansas (listed 1996)
- Cathedral of St. Vibiana in Los Angeles, California (listed 1997)
- Governors Island National Monument in New York, New York (listed 1998)
- Angel Island Immigration Station in San Francisco, California (listed 1999)
- Traveler's Rest in Lolo, Montana (listed 1999)
- President Lincoln's Cottage at the Soldiers' Home in Washington, D.C. (listed 2000)
- Nine Mile Canyon in Utah (listed 2004)
- Statler Hilton Hotel in Dallas, Texas (listed 2008)

== 2016 places ==
In June 2016, the National Trust announced its list of 11 most endangered places:

- Lions Municipal Golf Course in Austin, Texas
- Azikiwe–Nkrumah Hall at Lincoln University in Lincoln University, Pennsylvania
- Bears Ears in southeastern Utah
- Charleston Naval Hospital District in North Charleston, South Carolina
- Delta Queen in Houma, Louisiana.
- Chihuahuita and El Segundo Barrio neighborhoods in El Paso, Texas
- Historic Downtown Flemington, New Jersey
- James River in James City County, Virginia
- Mitchell Park Domes in Milwaukee, Wisconsin
- San Francisco Embarcadero in San Francisco, California
- Sunshine Mile in Tucson, Arizona

== 2015 places ==
The June 2015 announced places are:

- A.G. Gaston Motel, in Birmingham, Alabama, once "served as a 'war room' for leaders of the Civil Rights Movement"
- Carrollton Courthouse in Carrollton, New Orleans
- The Factory in West Hollywood, California
- Chautauqua Amphitheater, Chautauqua, New York
- East Point Historic Civic Block, East Point, Georgia
- Fort Worth Stockyards, Fort Worth, Texas
- Grand Canyon, Arizona
- Little Havana, Miami
- Oak Flat, Superior, Arizona
- Old U.S. Mint, San Francisco
- South Street Seaport, New York

== 2014 places ==
In June 2014, the National Trust announced its list of 11 most endangered places to be:

- Battle Mountain Sanitarium, Hot Springs, South Dakota
- Bay Harbor's East Island, Dade County, Florida
- Chattanooga State Office Building, Chattanooga, Tennessee
- Frank Lloyd Wright's Spring House, Tallahassee, Florida
- Historic Wintersburg, Huntington Beach, California
- Mokuaikaua, Kailua Village in Kona, Hawaii
- Music Hall, Cincinnati, Ohio (subsequently saved)
- Palladium Building, St. Louis, Missouri
- Shockoe Bottom, Richmond, Virginia
- The Palisades, Englewood Cliffs, New Jersey
- Union Terminal, Cincinnati, Ohio (subsequently saved)

== 2013 places ==
In June 2013, the National Trust announced its list of 11 most endangered places to be:

- Abyssinian Meeting House, Portland, Maine
- Astrodome, Houston, Texas (added to the National Register of Historic Places in 2014)
- Chinatown House, Rancho Cucamonga, California
- Gay Head Lighthouse, Aquinnah, Massachusetts
- Historic Rural Schoolhouses of Montana (statewide)
- James River, James City County, Virginia
- Kake Cannery, Kake, Alaska
- Mountain View Black Officers' Club, Fort Huachuca, Arizona
- San Jose Church, Old San Juan, San Juan, Puerto Rico
- Village of Mariemont, Cincinnati, Ohio
- Worldport Terminal at John F. Kennedy International Airport, Jamaica, Queens, New York (subsequently demolished)

== 2012 places ==
In June 2012, the National Trust announced its list of 11 most endangered places to be:

- Bridges of Yosemite Valley, Yosemite Village, California
- Ellis Island hospital complex, New York Harbor, New York and New Jersey
- Historic U.S. post office buildings (nationwide)
- Joe Frazier's Gym, Philadelphia, Pennsylvania (added to the National Register of Historic Places in 2013)
- Malcolm X—Ella Little-Collins House, Roxbury, Boston, Massachusetts
- Princeton Battlefield, Princeton, New Jersey
- Sweet Auburn Historic District, Atlanta, Georgia
- Terminal Island, Port of Los Angeles, California
- Texas courthouses, Texas (statewide)
- Elkhorn Ranch, Billings County, North Dakota
- Village of Zoar, Ohio

== 2011 places ==
- Bear Butte, Meade County, South Dakota
- Belmead-on-the-James, Powhatan County, Virginia
- China Alley, Hanford, California
- Fort Gaines, Dauphin Island, Alabama
- Greater Chaco Landscape, San Juan County and McKinley County, New Mexico, U.S.
- Isaac Manchester Farm, Avella, Pennsylvania
- John Coltrane Home, Dix Hills, New York
- National Soldiers Home, Milwaukee, Wisconsin
- Pillsbury A-Mill, Minneapolis, Minnesota
- Prentice Women's Hospital, Chicago, Illinois (demolished in 2014)
- Sites Imperiled by State Actions, Nationwide

== 2010 places ==
- America's State Parks & State-Owned Historic Sites
- Black Mountain, Kentucky
- Hinchliffe Stadium, Paterson, New Jersey
- Industrial Arts Building, Lincoln, Nebraska
- Juana Briones House, Palo Alto, California (demolished in 2011)
- Merritt Parkway, Fairfield County, Connecticut
- Metropolitan AME Church, Washington, D.C.
- Pågat, Guam
- Saugatuck Dunes, Laketown Township, Allegan County, Michigan
- Threefoot Building, Meridian, Mississippi
- Wilderness Battlefield, Spotsylvania County and Orange County, Virginia

== 2009 places ==
- Ames Shovel Shops, Easton, Massachusetts
- Cast-Iron Architecture of Galveston, Texas
- Century Plaza Hotel, Los Angeles, California
- Dorchester Academy, Midway, Georgia
- Human Services Center, Yankton, South Dakota
- Lana'i City, Maui, Hawaii
- Memorial Bridge, Portsmouth, New Hampshire & Kittery, Maine (original closed and demolished in 2012; new bridge opened on same site in 2013)
- Miami Marine Stadium, Miami, Florida
- Mount Taylor, Grants, New Mexico
- The Manhattan Project's Enola Gay Hangar at Wendover Air Force Base, Utah
- Unity Temple, Oak Park, Illinois

== 2008 places ==
- Bonnet House, Fort Lauderdale, Florida
- Boyd Theatre, Philadelphia, Pennsylvania (demolished in 2015)
- California State Parks, California
- Charity Hospital and the surrounding neighborhood, New Orleans, Louisiana
- Great Falls Portage, Great Falls, Montana
- Hangar One, Moffett Federal Airfield, Santa Clara County, California
- Michigan Avenue Streetwall, Chicago, Illinois
- Neighborhood of the Lower East Side, New York, New York
- Neighborhood of Peace Bridge, Buffalo, New York
- The Statler Hilton Hotel, Dallas, Texas
- Sumner Elementary School, Topeka, Kansas
- Vizcaya Museum and Gardens, Miami, Florida

== 2007 places ==
The 2007 places named to the list were:

- Brooklyn's Industrial Waterfront, New York, New York (from the Brooklyn Army Terminal in Sunset Park to Greenpoint Terminal Market site)
- El Camino Real Historic Trail, New Mexico
- H.H. Richardson House, Brookline, Massachusetts
- Hialeah Park Race Course, Hialeah, Florida
- Historic Places in Transmission Line Corridors
- Historic Route 66 Motels, Illinois to California
- Historic Structures in Mark Twain National Forest, 29 counties in Missouri
- Minidoka Internment Camp, Hunt, Idaho
- Philip Simmons Workshop and Home, Charleston, South Carolina
- Piñon Canyon Maneuver Site, Colorado
- Stewart's Point Rancheria, Sonoma County, California

== 2006 places ==
- Arts and Industries Building of the Smithsonian Institution, Washington, D.C.
- Blair Mountain Battlefield, Logan County, West Virginia
- Doo Wop Motels of Wildwood, New Jersey
- Fort Snelling Upper Post, Hennepin County, Minnesota
- Historic Communities and Landmarks of the Mississippi Coast
- Historic Neighborhoods of New Orleans, New Orleans, Louisiana
- Kenilworth, Illinois
- Kootenai Lodge, Bigfork, Montana
- Mission San Miguel Arcángel, San Miguel, California
- Over-the-Rhine Neighborhood, Cincinnati, Ohio
- World Trade Center Vesey Street Staircase, New York, New York

== 2005 places ==
- Daniel Webster Farm, Franklin, New Hampshire
- The Journey Through Hallowed Ground Corridor, Maryland, Pennsylvania and Virginia
- Belleview Biltmore Hotel, Belleair, Florida (largely demolished in 2015)
- Camp Security, York County, Pennsylvania
- Eleutherian College, Madison, Indiana
- Ennis-Brown House, Los Angeles, California
- Finca Vigía: Ernest Hemingway House, San Francisco de Paula, Cuba
- Historic Buildings of Downtown Detroit, Detroit, Michigan
- Historic Catholic Churches of Greater Boston, Boston, Massachusetts
- King Island, Alaska
- National Landscape Conservation System, Western States

== 2004 places ==
- 2 Columbus Circle, New York, New York
- Bethlehem Steel Plant, Bethlehem, Pennsylvania
- Elkmont Historic District, Elkmont, Tennessee
- George Kraigher House, Brownsville, Texas
- Gullah/Geechee Coast, South Carolina and Georgia
- Historic Cook County Hospital, Chicago, Illinois
- Madison-Lenox Hotel, Detroit, Michigan (demolished in 2005)
- Nine Mile Canyon, Utah
- Ridgewood Ranch, Home of Seabiscuit, Willits, California
- State of Vermont, Vermont
- Tobacco Barns of Southern Maryland, Maryland

== 2003 places ==
- Amelia Earhart Bridge, Atchison, Kansas
- Bathhouse Row, at Hot Springs National Park, Arkansas
- East Side School and Middle School, Decorah, Iowa
- Little Manila, Stockton, California
- Michigan Boulevard Garden Apartments, Chicago, Illinois
- Minute Man National Historical Park and Environs, Concord, Lincoln and Lexington, Massachusetts
- Ocmulgee Old Fields Traditional Cultural Property, Macon, Georgia
- TWA Terminal at John F. Kennedy International Airport, Jamaica, Queens, New York
- United States Marine Hospital, Louisville, Kentucky
- Urban Houses of Worship (nationwide)
- Zuñi Salt Lake and Sanctuary Zone, New Mexico

== 2002 places ==
- Chesapeake Bay Skipjacks, Statewide Maryland
- Gold Dome Bank, Oklahoma City, Oklahoma
- Guthrie Theater, Minneapolis, Minnesota
- Hackensack Water Works, Oradell, New Jersey
- Historic Bridges of Indiana, Statewide, Indiana
- Kw'st'an Sacred Sites at Indian Pass, Indian Pass, California
- Missouri River Cultural and Sacred Sites, Midwestern States, MO, MT, KS, NE, ND, SD
- Pompey's Pillar, Billings, Montana
- Rosenwald Schools, Southern and Southwestern States, MD, VA, WV, NC, SC, GA, FL, LA, AL, MS, TX, AR, NM, OK
- St. Elizabeths Hospital, Washington, D.C.
- Teardowns in Historic Neighborhoods, Nationwide

== 2001 places ==
- Bok Kai Temple, Marysville, California
- Carter G. Woodson House, Washington, D.C.
- CIGNA Campus, Bloomfield, Connecticut
- Ford Island at Pearl Harbor, Honolulu, Hawaii
- Historic American Movie Theaters, Nationwide
- Jackson Ward, Richmond, Virginia
- Los Caminos del Rio Heritage Corridor, Lower Rio Grande Valley, Texas
- Miller-Purdue Barn, Upland, Indiana
- Prairie Churches of North Dakota, Statewide North Dakota
- Stevens Creek Settlements, Lincoln, Nebraska
- Telluride Valley Floor, Telluride, Colorado

== 2000 places ==
- Eisenhower VA Medical Center, Leavenworth, Kansas
- Fifth & Forbes Historic Retail Area, Pittsburgh, Pennsylvania
- Historic Neighborhood Schools, Nationwide
- Hudson River Valley, Statewide, New York
- Lincoln cottage, Washington, D.C.
- Nantucket, Nantucket, Massachusetts
- Okeechobee Battlefield, Okeechobee, Florida
- Red Mountain Mining District, Colorado
- Santa Anita Racetrack, Arcadia, California
- Valley Forge National Historical Park, Valley Forge, Pennsylvania
- Wheelock Academy, Millerton, Oklahoma

== 1999 places ==
The 1999 list was:

- "The Corner of Main and Main" (nationwide)
- Angel Island Immigration Station, San Francisco, California
- Country Estates of River Road, Louisville, Kentucky
- "Four National Historic Landmark Hospitals" in New York (statewide) — specifically, the Utica State Hospital, Hudson River State Hospital, former Buffalo State Hospital, and New York State Inebriate Asylum
- Hulett Ore Unloaders, Whiskey Island, Cleveland, Ohio
- Lancaster County, Pennsylvania
- Pullman Historic District, Chicago, Illinois
- Richard H. Allen Memorial Auditorium at Sheldon Jackson College, Sitka, Alaska
- San Diego Arts & Warehouse District, San Diego, California
- Traveler's Rest, Missoula County, Montana
- West Side of Downtown Baltimore, Baltimore, Maryland

== 1998 places ==
The 1998 list was:

- Black Hawk and Central City, Colorado
- Cannery Row, Monterey, California
- Chancellorsville Battlefield, Fredericksburg, Virginia
- Governors Island, New York, New York
- Great Bowdoin Mill, Topsham, Maine
- Historic Courthouses of Texas, Texas (statewide)
- Historically Black Colleges & Universities (Southern states: Maryland, Virginia, West Virginia, North Carolina, South Carolina, Georgia, Florida, Louisiana, Alabama, Mississippi)
- Mapes Hotel, Reno, Nevada (subsequently demolished)
- Mesa Verde National Park, Colorado
- Michigan's Historic Lighthouses, exemplified by DeTour Reef Light, Michigan (statewide)
- Monocacy Aqueduct, Frederick County, Maryland

== 1997 places ==
The 1997 list was:

- Bridge of Lions, St. Augustine, Florida
- Cathedral of St. Vibiana, Los Angeles, California
- Congressional Cemetery, Washington, D.C.
- Cranston Street Armory, Providence, Rhode Island
- Flathead Indian Reservation, Lake, Sanders, Missoula, and Flathead, Montana
- Historic Buildings Infested with Formosan Termites, Gulf Coast states (Louisiana, Florida, Texas, Mississippi, Alabama, Georgia)
- Montezuma Castle, Montezuma, New Mexico
- Stillwater Bridge, Stillwater, Minnesota
- Vicksburg Campaign Trail, Missouri and Louisiana
- Wa'ahila Ridge, Honolulu, Hawaii

== 1996 places ==
The 1996 list was:

- Adobe Churches of New Mexico, Statewide New Mexico
- East Broad Top Railroad, Rockhill Furnace, Pennsylvania
- East End Historic District, Newburgh, New York
- Harry S. Truman Historic District, Independence, Missouri
- Historic Black Churches of the South, Southern States, MD, VA, WV, NC, SC, GA, FL, LA, AL, MS
- Historic Structures in Glacier National Park, Glacier National Park, Montana
- Knight Foundry, Sutter Creek, California
- Little Rock Central High School, Little Rock, Arkansas
- Petoskey, Petoskey, Michigan
- Sotterley Plantation, Hollywood, Maryland
- Uptown Theatre, Chicago, Illinois
- Wentworth-by-the-Sea Hotel, New Castle, New Hampshire

== 1995 places ==
The 1995 list was:

- Archaeological Treasures of the Colorado Plateau, Statewide Colorado
- Ashley River Historic District, Ashley River (South Carolina)
- Bronx River Parkway, Bronx, New York
- Fair Park's Texas Centennial Buildings, Dallas, Texas
- Farish Street Neighborhood Historic District, Jackson, Mississippi
- Historic Boston Theaters, Boston, Massachusetts
- Ossabaw Island, Ossabaw Island, Georgia
- South Pass, South Pass, Wyoming
- Tugboat Hoga, Oakland, California
- Village of East Aurora, East Aurora, New York
- Waikiki Natatorium War Memorial, Honolulu, Hawaii

== 1994 places ==
The 1994 list was:

- Cape Cod, Massachusetts
- Cornices (and Buildings of Harlem), Harlem, New York
- Fair Park's Texas Centennial Buildings, Dallas, Texas
- Frank Lloyd Wright's Taliesin, Spring Green, Wisconsin
- Historic Northern Virginia Piedmont, Virginia Piemont, Virginia
- Manuelito Archaeological Complex, Gallup vicinity, New Mexico
- Natchez, Natchez, Mississippi
- Oldest Surviving McDonald's, Downey, California
- Old San Francisco Mint, San Francisco, California
- U.S.S. Constellation, Baltimore, Maryland
- Virginia City, Montana

== 1993 places ==
The 1993 list was:

- Brandy Station Battlefield, Fredericksburg, Virginia
- Downtown New Orleans, New Orleans, Louisiana
- Eight Historic Dallas Neighborhoods, Dallas, Texas
- Schooner C.A. Thayer, San Francisco, California
- Prehistoric Serpent Mound, Locust Grove, Adams County, Ohio
- South Pasadena, California
- State of Vermont
- Sweetgrass Hills, Montana
- Thomas Edison's Invention Factory, West Orange, New Jersey
- Town of Ste. Genevieve, Missouri
- Virginia City, Montana

== 1992 places ==
The 1992 list was:

- Virginia City, Montana
- Eight Historic Dallas Neighborhoods, Dallas, Texas
- Ellis Island National Monument, New York Harbor, New York, Harlem New York
- Gettysburg National Military Park, Gettysburg, Pennsylvania
- Louisiana's Historic River Road, Louisiana
- Sweet Auburn, Atlanta, Georgia
- West Baden Springs Hotel, West Baden Springs, Indiana
- Independence National Historical Park, Philadelphia, Pennsylvania
- Montpelier, Orange, Virginia
- Tiger Stadium, Detroit, Michigan (demolished 2008–09)

== 1991 places ==
The 1991 list was:

- Antietam National Battlefield Park, Sharpsburg, Maryland
- Fort Frederica, St. Simons Island, Georgia
- Franklin Post Office, Franklin, Tennessee
- Independence National Historical Park, Philadelphia, Pennsylvania
- Kennecott Mines, Kennecott, Alaska
- Montpelier, Orange, Virginia
- Penn School, Frogmore, South Carolina
- South Pasadena, California
- Southeast Light, Block Island, Rhode Island
- Tiger Stadium, Detroit, Michigan
- Walden Pond and Woods, Concord and Lincoln, Massachusetts

== 1990 places ==
The 1990 list was:

- Antietam National Battlefield Park, Sharpsburg, Maryland
- Columbus Landing Site, St. Croix, U.S. Virgin Islands
- Deadwood Historic District, Deadwood, South Dakota
- Fort Frederica, St. Simons Island, Georgia
- Kennecott Mines, Kennecott, Alaska
- Penn School, Frogmore, South Carolina
- Roycroft Inn and Campus, East Aurora, New York
- South Pasadena, California
- Southeast Light, Block Island, Rhode Island
- Walden Pond and Woods, Concord and Lincoln, Massachusetts
- West Mesa Petroglyphs, Albuquerque, New Mexico

== 1989 places ==
The 1989 list was:

- Antietam National Battlefield Park, Sharpsburg, Maryland
- Cedar Creek Battlefield and Belle Grove Plantation, Middletown, Virginia
- Columbus Landing Site, St. Croix, U.S. Virgin Islands
- Deadwood Historic District, Deadwood, South Dakota
- Fort Frederica, St. Simons Island, Georgia
- Old Deerfield Historic District, Deerfield, Massachusetts
- Old Kaskaskia Village, Kaskaskia, Illinois
- Roycroft Inn and Campus, East Aurora, New York
- South Pasadena, California
- Vieux Carre Historic District, New Orleans, Louisiana
- West Mesa Petroglyphs, Albuquerque, New Mexico

== 1988 places ==
The 1988 list was:

- Antietam National Battlefield Park, Sharpsburg, Maryland
- Cedar Creek Battlefield and Belle Grove Plantation, Middletown, Virginia
- Columbus Landing Site, St. Croix, U.S. Virgin Islands
- Custer Battlefield National Monument & Reno-Benteen Battlefield Memorial, Montana
- Manassas National Battlefield Historic District, Manassas, Virginia
- Old Deerfield Historic District, Deerfield, Massachusetts
- Old Kaskaskia Village, Kaskaskia, Illinois
- Snee Farm, Mt. Pleasant, South Carolina
- Vieux Carre Historic District, New Orleans, Louisiana
- Waterford Historic District, Waterford, Virginia
- West Mesa Petroglyphs, Albuquerque, New Mexico

== See also ==
- List of threatened historic sites in the United States
