= MTW =

MTW may refer to:

== Places ==
- Motya, written in Phoenician as mṭwʾ

== Science literature ==
- Misner, Thorne & Wheeler's book Gravitation on Einstein's general theory of relativity

== Media/literature works ==
- Medieval: Total War, 2001 video game
- Mock the Week, British TV programme which debuted in 2005
- Martin the Warrior, 1993 fantasy novel
- Menschen Technik Wissenschaft (MTW), the preceding show of Einstein on Swiss television SRF

== Transport ==
- MTW, the IATA airport code for Manitowoc County Airport in Manitowoc, Wisconsin
- Maximum taxi weight, or maximum ramp weight, maximum weight for an aircraft being maneuvered on the ground
- Maximum takeoff weight, alternate abbreviation instead of MTOW
- Marinette, Tomahawk and Western Railroad, see List of Wisconsin railroads

== Other ==
- Magahat language (ISO 639 language code: mtw)
- Mission to the World, mission-sending agency for the Presbyterian Church in America
- Machine Tool Wire
- Maoism (Third Worldism), an economic and political philosophy
- Moving to Work, a demonstration programme for Public Housing Authorities in the United States
