= Worldport =

Worldport can refer to:

- Worldport (Pan Am), at John F. Kennedy International Airport in New York City that operated from 1960 to 2013
- Worldport (UPS air hub), at Louisville International Airport in Louisville, Kentucky
