= Isaac Manchester House =

Historic house in Pennsylvania, United States

- Plantation Plenty
- U.S. National Register of Historic Places
- Washington County History & Landmarks Foundation Landmark
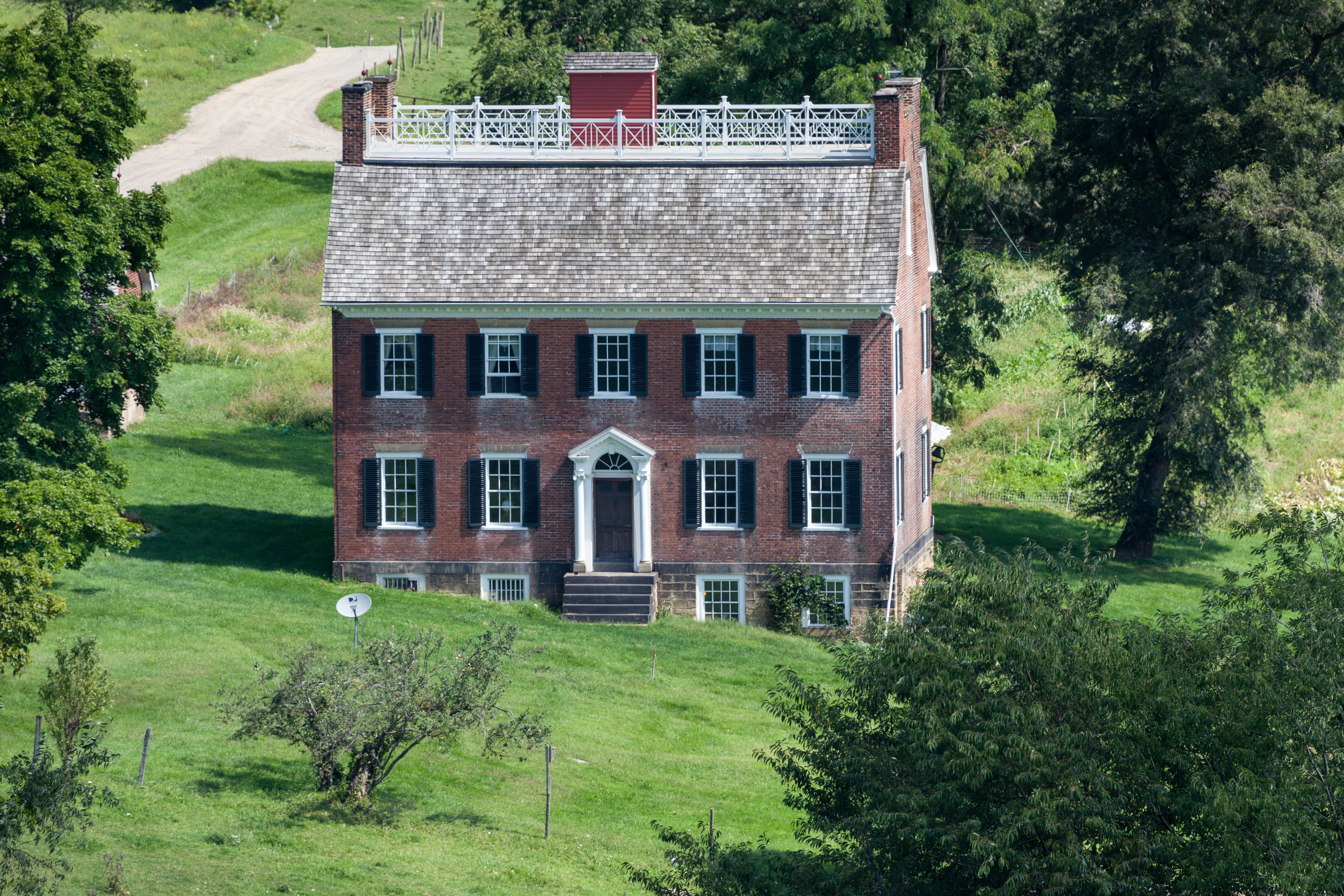
- The farm house in August 2014

- Location within Pennsylvania Location within the United States
- Nearest city: Avella, Pennsylvania
- Coordinates: 40°15′17″N 80°27′40″W
- Area: 5 acres (2.0 ha)
- Built: 1815
- Architectural style: Georgian
- NRHP reference No.: 75001673
- Added to NRHP: June 21, 1975

Plantation Plenty, also known as the Isaac Manchester House, is an historic building which is located in Avella, Pennsylvania, United States.

It was designated as a historic residential landmark/farmstead by the Washington County History & Landmarks Foundation, and was listed on the National Register of Historic Places in 1975, with a boundary enlargement and renaming undertaken in 2016.

== History and architectural features ==
The property is endangered by longwall coal mining.

In 2011, it was named to the list of America's Most Endangered Places by the National Trust for Historic Preservation.
