= Alazán-Apache Courts =

Public housing in San Antonio, Texas, United States

Coordinates: 29.416865°N 98.514893°W

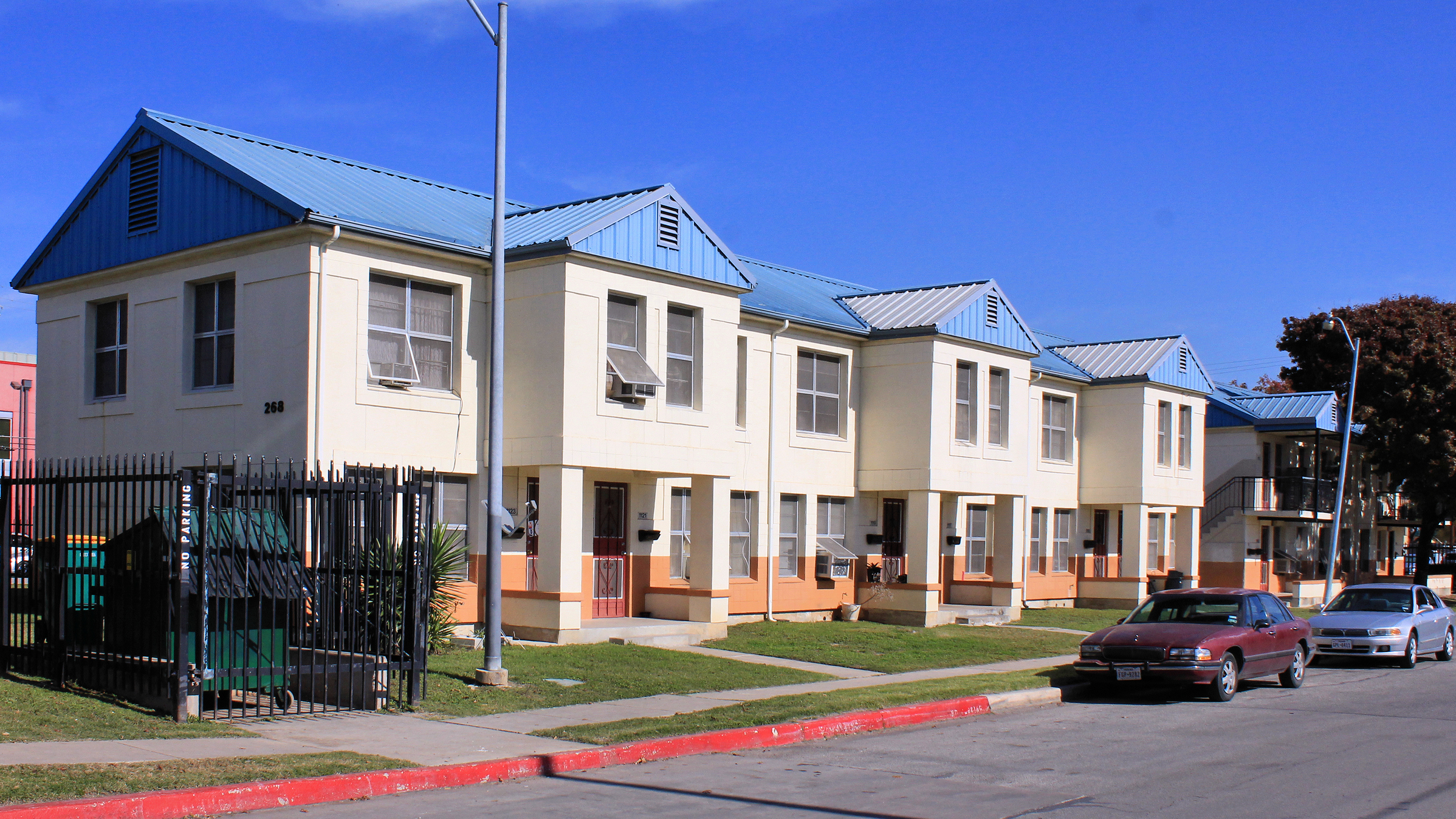
Alazan-Apache Courts Units

Alazán-Apache Courts is a public housing community in San Antonio. The neighborhood is located on the city's West Side, and was built in 1939. It was the first public housing built in the city and is currently made up of three different properties: Alazán, Apache and Guadalupe Homes. It is also one of the first public housing projects in the United States and originally served a predominantly Mexican-American neighborhood.

== History ==
San Antonio had the largest Mexican population in Texas in 1930 and most were unskilled laborers with low-paying jobs. Because of the poverty that most people of Mexican descent lived in, there was a "miserable standard of living." In 1930, only 30% of Mexican Americans were homeowners in San Antonio, as compared to 40% black and 50% white homeowners.

Alazán-Apache Courts was funded by the United States Housing Authority (USHA) in September 1937. It was originally created to house "exclusively Mexican residents." The project had the support of a local priest, Father Carmelo Tranchese, who was the pastor of the Our Lady of Guadalupe Church. He was also one of the five commissioners on the newly created San Antonio Housing Authority (SAHS). The project also had support from Mayor Charles K. Quin, Congressman Fontaine Maury Maverick, the Junior Chamber of Commerce and the new group, Liga de Leales Latinoamericanos (League of Loyal Latin Americans). The funds set aside by the USHA in 1937 were eventually able to be released when the city of San Antonio passed a resolution agreeing to the stipulations of the USHA on May 5, 1938. When the project nearly stalled, Tranchese wrote to Eleanor Roosevelt, describing the conditions of the people in the area and asked for her support. Tranchese's decision to write Roosevelt paid off, with the first lady ensuring that the projects would go ahead. Work began by demolishing the substandard homes already occupying the site. New buildings were constructed in 1939.

The first tenants were allowed to start living in completed buildings in August 1940. The buildings were made of hollow tile and concrete and covered an area of about sixty acres. Rent for the buildings in the community was based on income and by the mid-1940s, there were around 4,500 residents, half of which were children. The buildings had the "rare amenity of a private bathroom." All of the 2,554 single-family units were open to all tenants by the end of 1942. By 1945, there were around 4,994 people living in the project. While the project tried to rehouse people who had been displaced by the projects, families whose income was too high to qualify were not given any help to relocate.

In 1969, the project was described in a piece published by the Arizona Daily Star as a place "where some 6,000 Mexican Americans live in wretched poverty and frequent hunger." Plans to renovate the community went out for a contract bid between four different Mexican American contractors in 1970.

In the 1980s, 99% of the residents were Hispanic and it was claimed that this was due to "voluntary segregation."

During the 1980s and 1990s, conditions in the courts began to become neglected during the crack epidemic which led to increased crime and drug activity.

In the 1990s, it was considered the largest project in San Antonio and faced with issues of serious overcrowding. Some of the buildings were renovated in the 1990s and new buildings were built based on the architecture of the Guadalupe Homes nearby.

In October 2019, a group of Alazan residents appeared before the San Antonio Housing Commission to speak on many issues, citing illegal evictions, excessive fees, false lease violations, and harassment. The tenants, led by the Historic Westside Residents Association, lobby to preserve the Alazan/Apache homes which are currently set to be torn down and replaced with luxury lofts in a mixed income setting that only allows 10% of its residents public housing tenants. The gentrification of the Westside is a growing debate. In 2020, the National Trust for Historic Preservation named the project as one of America's most endangered historic places.

== Notable residents ==
- Ignacio M. Garcia
- Eva Garza
- Orlando Mendez-Valdez
- Lydia Mendoza
