= Zoomorphic architecture =

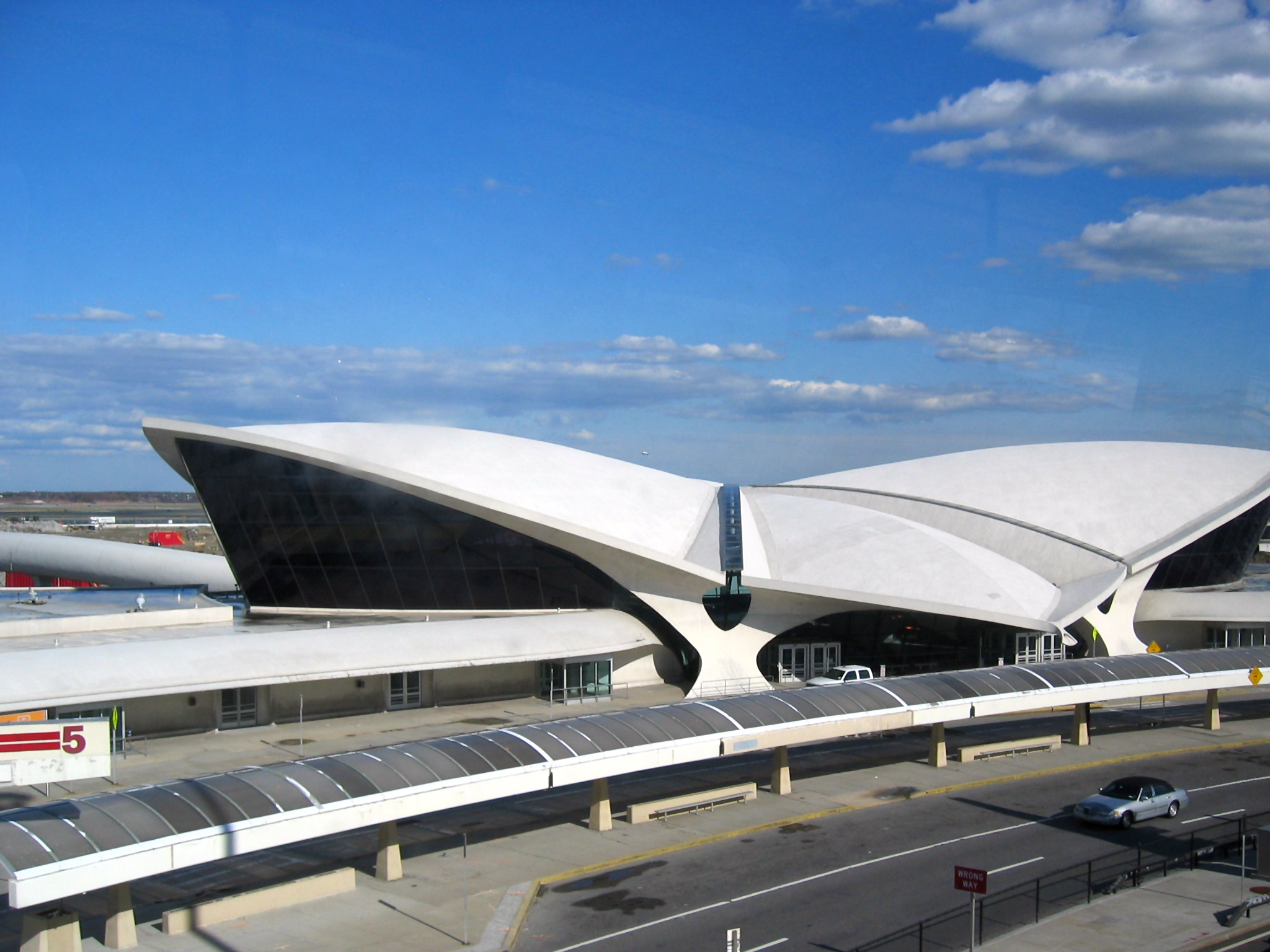
TWA Flight Center, New York

Zoomorphic architecture is the practice of using animal forms as the inspirational basis and blueprint for architectural design. "While animal forms have always played a role adding some of the deepest layers of meaning in architecture, it is now becoming evident that a new strand of biomorphism is emerging where the meaning derives not from any specific representation but from a more general allusion to biological processes."

The practice is said by some to be a reaction against some of the modern schools of architecture, such as Modernism and their apparent opposition to nature and organic form. Commenting on the movement away from these rigid and artificial design trends, Susannah Hagan, in her book Taking Shape, has this to say: "The oppositions between culture and nature, so importantly and brutally drawn up by modernism, are dissolving again, not in a return to what was, but a transformation of it...The division between the living organism and the machine continues to collapse."

Zoomorphic architecture is sometimes used in contemporary Native American architecture to reflect animals prominent in Indigenous cosmology, such as The Turtle, also known as the Native American Center for the Living Arts, in Niagara Falls, New York.

== Famous works ==
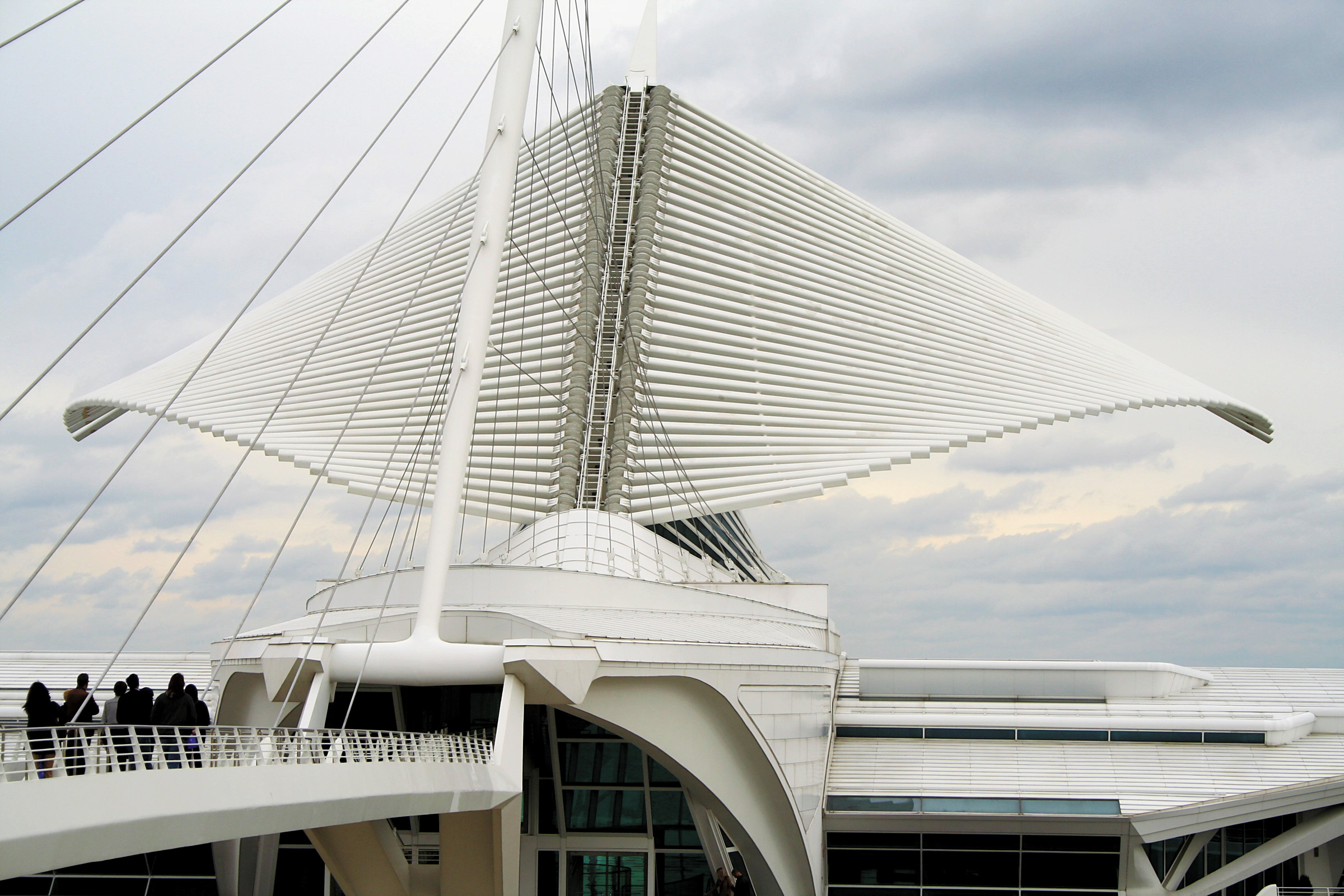
Oriental Milwaukee Art Museum

Some well-known examples of zoomorphic architecture can be found in the TWA Flight Center building in New York City, by Eero Saarinen, or the Milwaukee Art Museum by Santiago Calatrava, both inspired by the form of a bird's wings.

== Architects who have used zoomorphism in their work ==
- Basil Al Bayati
- Le Corbusier
- Eero Saarinen
- Fariborz Sahba
- Santiago Calatrava
