= Dmitri Kessel =

Photojournalist

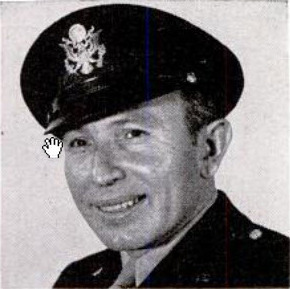
Kessel in Life Magazine, January 1945

Dmitri Kessel (born Dmitri Solomonovich Keselman, Russian: Дмитрий Соломонович Кесельман; 20 August 1902 – 26 March 1995) was a photojournalist and staff photographer on Life magazine known for his courageous coverage of war on the front line, including reports on the liberation of Europe and conflict in the Congo.

== Early life ==
Dmitri Kessel was born as Dmitri Kesselman in Kiev to a Jewish family of sugar beet farmers and landowners. His parents were Solomon and Sonja Keselman. He had sisters Franya Keselman (1897–1959), Polya Morman and Manya Sweet. He grew up in the Podolia Governorate of Russia (now Ukraine). As a boy he learned to use a box camera to snap photos of friends, family and his everyday life. Involved with Ukrainian People's Party, he documented a massacre by Ukrainian villagers of pillaging Polish invaders but had his camera destroyed by the leader of the Ukrainian mob. From the age of ten Kessel trained at the Poltava Military Academy in Russia to serve as cavalry officer, and later joined the Red Army campaign against the Poles during the Polish–Soviet War (1919–21).

On quitting the army, Kessel studied leather tanning and industrial chemistry in Moscow 1921–22. Whilst bidding his family farewell as they moved to Russia from Ukraine, he was arrested by Polish guards but escaped to Romania where he was again detained but released.

== Photographic career in America ==
Kessel emigrated to the US via Romania in 1923 (naturalized 1929) to New York City and worked at part-time jobs in the fur industry and for Russian-language newspapers. He attended night classes at City College, then in 1934 attended Ben Magid Rabinovitch's (1884–1964) School of Photography (founded in 1920). His training in photography coincided with rapid changes within the medium itself. Exploiting his industrial experience and contacts, he specialised in photography for factory owners. This led to his being signed on as a freelance for Henry Luce's Fortune in 1935, which secured his success as a photojournalist, with assignments to cover World War 2 from 1939. He became a staffer and war correspondent for Life in 1944, and he remained with the magazine until 1972.

In late 1944, he was landed in Athens with the British and the Greek government in exile. Kessel took several photos of the protagonists during the Dekemvriana events that ended with communist defeat.

In the post-war years, Kessel worked mostly for Life at their Paris bureau, travelling to cover stories on ideological struggles and territorial disputes in Hungary, China, Palestine, India, Spain, Ceylon and Japan. In 1950, assigned to the Aga Khan's wedding, he and journalist Dita Comacho documented growing tension between Iran and the Soviet Union, and after extending their stay to six weeks produced an eight-page cover story in Life.

From the mid-1950s he photographed Europe's religious architecture, including St Mark's, in Venice, and the opulent monuments of the Vatican.

In 1955 curator Edward Steichen included eight of his images in his world-touring Museum of Modern Art exhibition, seen by 9 million visitors, The Family of Man; a woman voting in France, a couple silhouetted in a doorway in China, a river reflecting a misty sky between rugged mountains in China, a family's summer harvest in Italy, a farmer sowing seeds by hand in China, a mine worker in the Belgian Congo, a large team of men straining to tow a barge upstream on a turbulent river in China, and children dancing in a circle, also in China.

The September 22, 1961 issue of Life featured a photo essay of JFK Airport (then known as Idlewild Airport) by him. Many of the photos were of the newly built Pan Am Terminal, Worldport.

== Personal life ==
In 1964 he married Shirley Farmer.

Kessel died in Southampton, New York on 26 March 1995.
