= The Turtle (Native American Center for the Living Arts) =

Building in Niagara Falls, New York, US

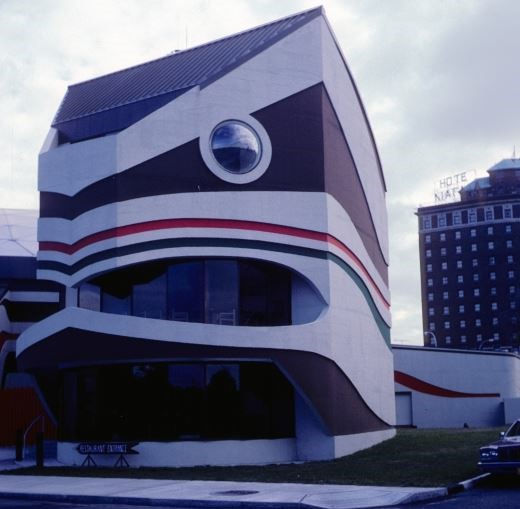
- Head of the Turtle

General information
- Location: 25 Rainbow Boulevard, Niagara Falls, New York 14303
- Coordinates: 43.0850°N 79.0627°W
- Year built: 1977–1981
- Opened: May 1981
- Closed: 1995
- Owner: Niagara Falls Redevelopment

Technical details
- Material: Concrete
- Floor count: 3
- Floor area: 67,000 square feet (6,200 m^{2})

Design and construction
- Architect: Dennis Sun Rhodes

The Turtle, also known as the Turtle Building or the Native American Center for the Living Arts, is a three-story building in Niagara Falls, New York. The building was opened in May 1981 as the headquarters for the Native American Center for the Living Arts, an organization dedicated to promoting Native American visual and performing arts. Its unique shape, with a geodesic dome roof "shell" and large porthole "eye" windows, invokes the Haudenosaunee creation story of the earth forming on the back of a giant turtle. After closing in 1995 due to financial trouble, the building has remained vacant, with its future preservation and use in question.

== Organization foundation and building construction ==
In May 1970, Tuscarora sculptor Wilmer "Duffy" Wilson and a group of Native Americans including Cherokee actor Arthur Junaluska, Cahuilla writer Rupert Costo, and non-native singer-songwriter Buffy Sainte-Marie, founded the Native American Center for the Living Arts (NACLA) in New York City. Their motivation was to promote the preservation of the visual and performing arts of Native American peoples and to encourage the development of new forms of creative expression. Wilson moved the center to a storefront in Niagara Falls in 1975 which included an art gallery, handicraft shop, and museum exhibit space. Support from the community inspired the idea of the construction of a permanent structure dedicated to Native American culture. The center submitted a proposal to the Economic Development Administration and secured a $4.9 million grant.

The shape of the building was envisioned by Wilson and his coworker, and reflects the Haudenosaunee creation story of Muskrat bringing a piece of the earth from below the water, creating the Western hemisphere on the back of a giant turtle. The use of the symbolic design is emblematic of twentieth-century Native American architecture, as The Turtle joined other zoomorphic buildings such as the Cornwall Island (Ahkwesahsne Mohawk) School in Ontario. The large porthole windows act as eyes which gaze toward the Upper Niagara River Rapids, while the geodesic dome roof includes a skylight in the shape of an eagle. The location of the building, the closest structure to the American side of Niagara Falls, was chosen because of the proximity to tourist activity as well as the fact that the Haudenosaunee saw the Falls as a sacred site.

The architect, Dennis Sun Rhodes of the Northern Arapaho, said in 1988 that "[t]he turtle is one of the highest symbols of the Eastern American Indians and represents an all-encompassing holding up of the earth. Behind the architectural concepts are Indian philosophy and cultural values." Rhodes would go on to design other Indigenous centers such as the Minneapolis American Indian Center and the Piya Wiconi Building at Oglala Lakota College on the Pine Ridge Indian Reservation.

Groundbreaking ceremonies were held on the site in September 1977. Inflation in the late 1970s caused the building to open a year behind schedule and about $750,000 over budget.

== The Turtle as site of the Native American Center for the Living Arts ==
The Turtle opened to the public in May 1981; at the time, NACLA was the largest center for Indigenous arts in the Eastern United States. It housed thousands of Native artifacts, 200 contemporary artworks, and an archive of photographs; local artists regularly displayed artwork in the building's exhibit spaces.

Film and theatrical presentations were hosted within the circular 250-seat performance theater. An all-Native American theatre company, Indian Time Theater, was run out of NACLA and directed by Bruce King. A children's theater workshop brought performing arts to local Native American communities.

The center sponsored craft shows and held dance performances and powwows with dancers from across North America. NACLA had a 500-volume library and published Turtle Quarterly, a glossy arts and current affairs magazine that was funded in part by the National Endowment for the Arts. During its heyday, the Turtle housed a craft shop, a restaurant, gallery space, offices and meeting rooms for the community.

== Closure ==
In 1989, the organization laid off employees after state subsidies no longer covered the cost of running the building. In May 1993, most of the building's power was shut off when unpaid electrical bills reached $100,000.

The center formally closed in 1995, in part due to the declining manufacturing economy of the city. Many exhibited items were auctioned off to pay the federal tax bill. The University at Buffalo offered to take over the building and operate it as a Native American cultural center, but city leaders rejected the offer because it did not include payment of the center's back taxes. The city foreclosed on the building in April 1996.

At the city's request, the building was purchased in 1997 for $1,000,000 by Niagara Falls Redevelopment (NFR), a real estate company owned by the Milstein family, along with development rights to much of the city.

== Preservation efforts ==
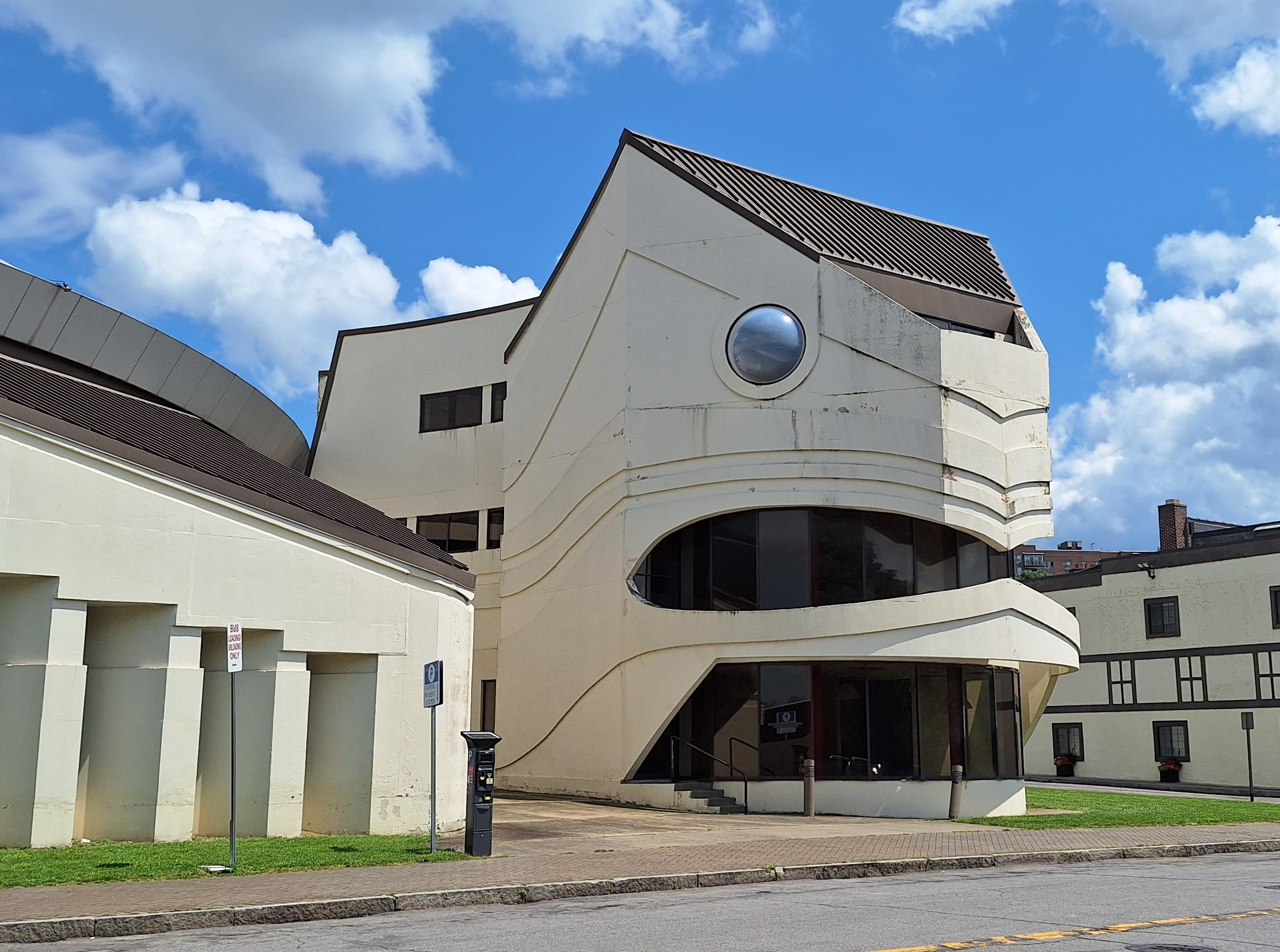
The Turtle in July 2024

In 2000, Niagara Falls Redevelopment announced plans to develop the building into a museum with plans to apply for partnership with the Smithsonian Institution, but those plans never came to fruition. In 2017, NFR requested that the city allow a variance from the downtown height limits to tear down the Turtle and build a 20-story hotel, but city officials did not grant that request.

Preservation Buffalo Niagara began a campaign in the summer of 2022 to encourage the Niagara Falls City Council to approve a landmark designation for the building. In March 2024, Niagara Falls City Council voted against granting landmark status. A community group named Friends of the Turtle continues to raise awareness and draft potential use plans to "reawaken" the Turtle.

The National Trust for Historic Preservation included the Turtle as one of the 11 sites chosen for its America's Most Endangered Places list in 2025.

== Gallery ==
Photos from the Joseph Messana Architectural Image Collection at the University of Nebraska–Lincoln
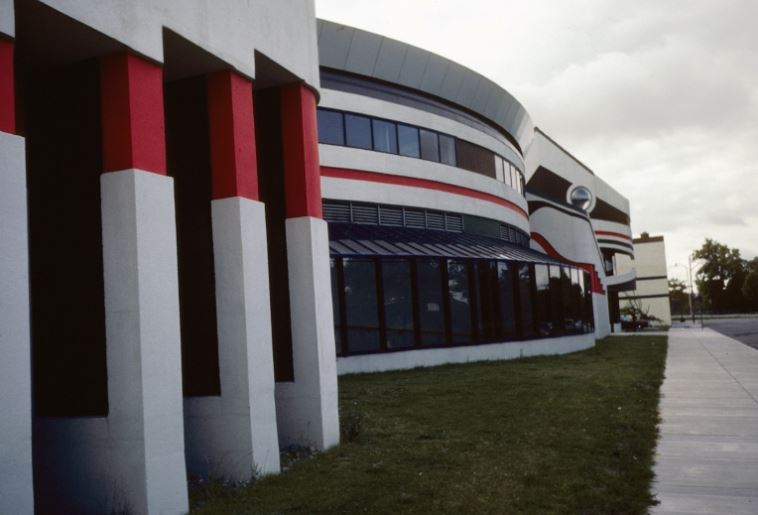
Profile of the Turtle's exterior

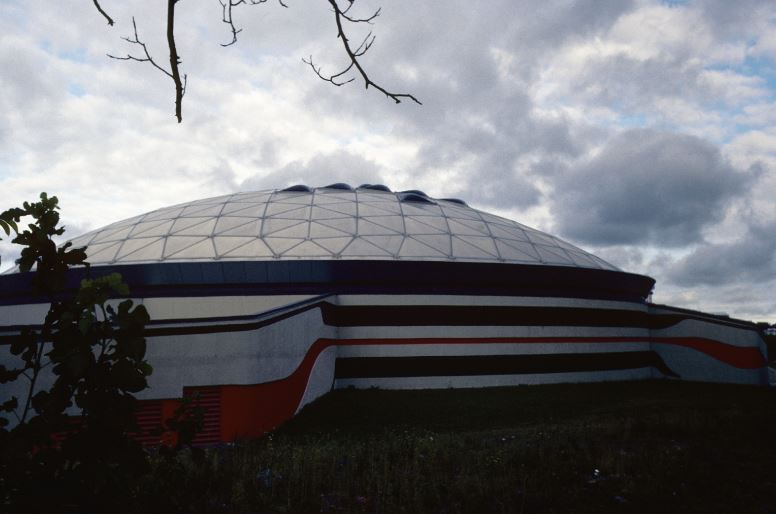
Exterior showing skylights on the dome

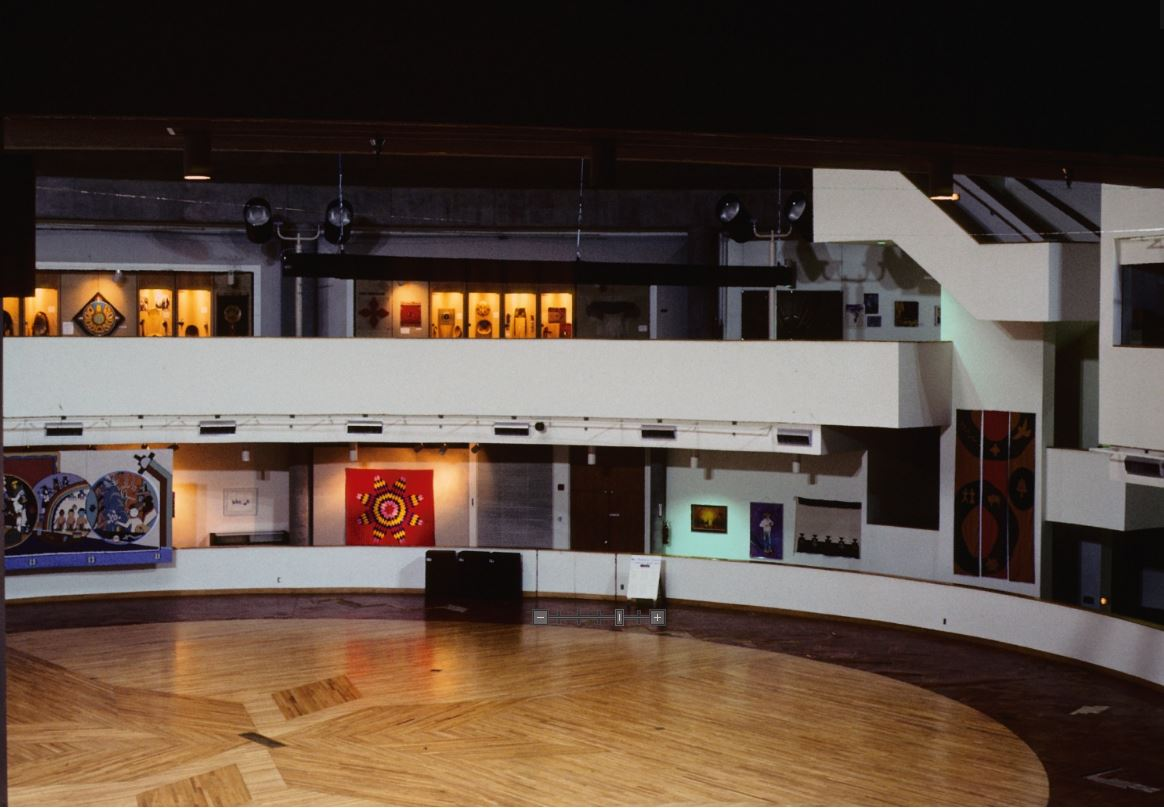
The parquet floor and items on exhibit

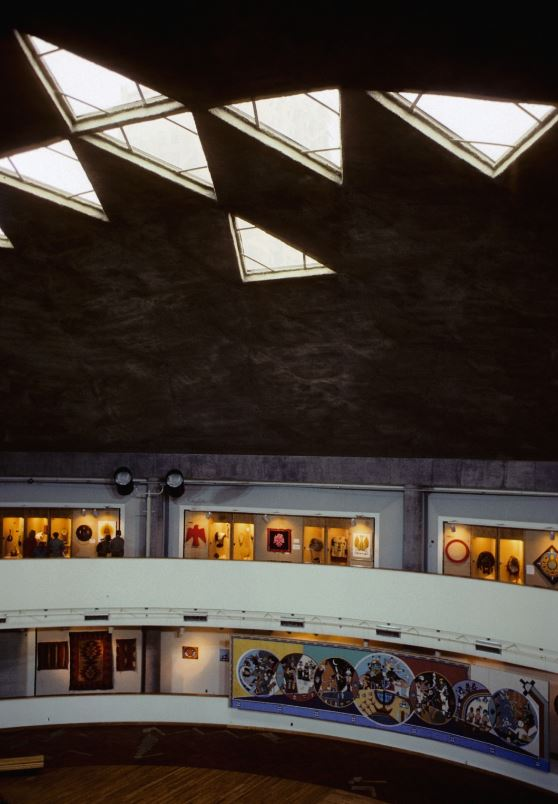
Geometric eagle skylight
