= Opportunity Home San Antonio =

Opportunity Home San Antonio, formerly known as the San Antonio Housing Authority, is a housing authority located in San Antonio, Texas and is the largest housing authority in Texas determined by number of housing units. It is the only Moving to Work Housing Authority in Texas, a designation by HUD given to high performing housing authorities. Their main programs are Section 8 housing, Affordable Housing and Low-Income Housing. Opportunity Home is also one of the few housing authorities to develop their own units. In 2008, SAHA was listed as the 5th largest affordable housing developer in the United States with 1,205 units completed.
