= Georgia Williams Nursing Home =

Historic nursing home in Georgia, United States

- U.S. National Register of Historic Places
- Location within Georgia Location within the United States
- Location: 176 Dyer St., Camilla, Georgia
- Coordinates: 31.23663°N 84.20784°W
- Architectural style: Bungalow
- NRHP reference No.: 11000180
- Added to NRHP: April 8, 2011

The Georgia B. Williams Nursing Home in Camilla, Georgia was the only facility where African-American women could deliver babies in Mitchell County, for many years prior to the Civil Rights Movement. It was owned by Beatrice ("Miss Bea") Borders (1892–1971), a midwife who delivered over 6,000 babies at the home between 1941 and 1971.

The building is a bungalow residence at 176 Dyer St.

It was listed on the National Register of Historic Places in 2011.

The Georgia B. Williams Nursing Home operated until Borders' death in 1971.

In 2021, the National Trust for Historic Preservation's African American Cultural Heritage Action Fund issued a grant for the purpose of rehabilitating the home and creating a Southern African-American Midwife Museum and center.
