= Chinatown House =

Historic building in Rancho Cucamonga, California, US

Coordinates: 34.108382°N 117.598156°W

- Location within California

History
- Built: 1919

The Chinatown House is an historic building in Rancho Cucamonga, California. It is one of the last surviving examples of historic Chinese worker housing in the region.

Built in 1919, the two-story brick building once housed 50 Chinese American laborers. It also served as a general store for the community.

== History ==
The Chinese American population of the region first blossomed in the 1880s. A fire destroyed much of the community in 1919. The Chinatown House was built shortly after the fire.

== Structure ==
The Chinatown House was built of unreinforced brick masonry, with 10 small rooms downstairs and two long rooms upstairs.

== Preservation ==
Chinatown House was registered as a California Historical Resource with the California Office of Historic Preservation on December 22, 1975. The building was designated a city landmark in 1985, and in 2013, The National Trust for Historic Preservation added the building to its list of America's 11 Most Endangered Historic Places. Chinatown House is registered with the California Points of Historical Interest as point SBR-077.

The Cucamonga Valley Water District owns the house and had planned the house's demolition when local advocates began an effort to preserve the structure, led by a group named the Chinatown House Preservation Coalition.
