= L.V. Hull =

American artist

- Born: 1942; McAdams, Mississippi
- Died: 2008 (aged 65–66)
- Known for: assemblage, outsider art

L.V. Hull (1942–2008) was an American assemblage artist. She was born in 1942 in McAdams, Mississippi. She spent many years in Kosciusko, Mississippi. A self-taught artist, she began painting and assembling objects in her home and garden in 1975. Among the objects assembled are painted hubcaps, shoes and signs. L.V. Hull died in 2008.

After her death, attempts were made to preserve the site and the objects, but despite a grant from the American Folklore Society, involvement of the Mississippi Arts Commission, and the formation of The Friends of L.V. the project was not a success. The house was in disrepair and ownership was questionable. In the process of sorting out ownership, the house fell into further disrepair. The Friends of L.V. took photographs to document how the house and garden appeared when Hull was alive and many of the art objects were moved to Kosciusko city hall.

Vaughn Sills' 2001 photograph of her garden is in the Smithsonian American Art Museum. It is part of the series Places for the Spirit, Traditional African American Gardens of the South.

From March 20 - June 14, 2026, the Mississippi Museum of Art exhibited L.V. Hull: Love Is a Sensation, the first major exhibition devoted to Hull’s work.
