= Bethlehem Steel Lehigh Plant Mill No. 2 Annex =

- Bethlehem Steel Lehigh Plant Mill #2 Annex
- U.S. National Register of Historic Places
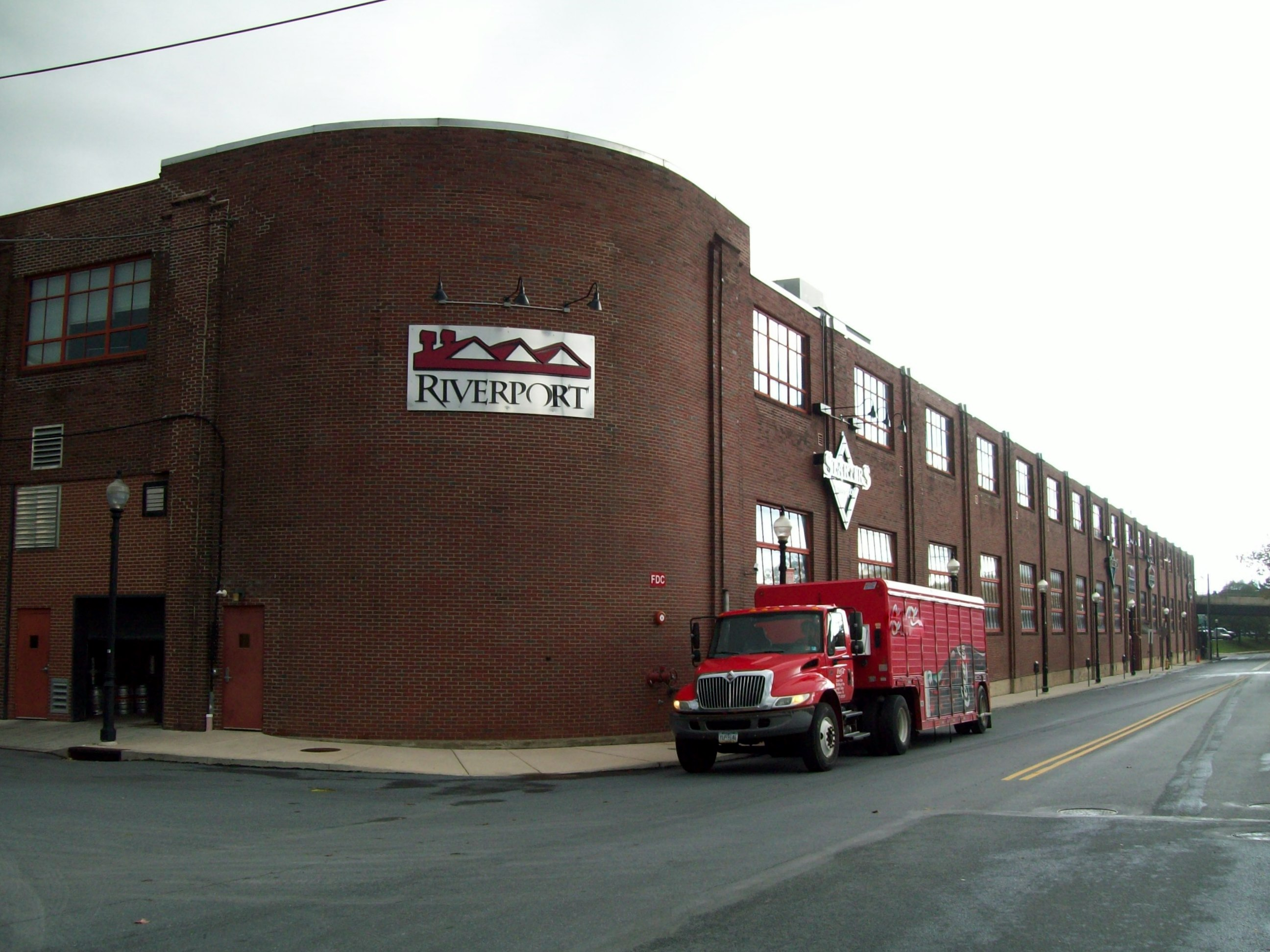
- Lehigh Plant Mill No. 2 Annex in 2011

- Location within Pennsylvania Location within the United States
- Location: 11 W. 2nd Street, Bethlehem, Pennsylvania, U.S.
- Coordinates: 40°36′55″N 75°22′46″W
- Area: 4.5 acres (1.8 ha)
- Built: 1940–1942
- Built by: Bethlehem Steel Corporation
- Architectural style: 20th century industrial
- NRHP reference No.: 04000401
- Added to NRHP: May 5, 2004

Bethlehem Steel Lehigh Plant Mill #2 Annex, also known as Merchant Mill No. 2 and the Johnson Machinery Building, is part of the historic steel mill located in Bethlehem in Northampton County and the Lehigh Valley region of eastern Pennsylvania. It is a large, square, two-story brick industrial building.

== History ==
The Mill #2 Annex was built between 1940 and 1942, by the Bethlehem Steel Corporation.

It was originally designed and built as a surface preparation and finishing mill for the Alloy and Tool Steel Division at Bethlehem Steel's Lehigh Plant in Bethlehem.

The 4.5 acres (1.8 ha) Mill No. 2 Annex was added to the National Register of Historic Places in 2004.

The building has since been renovated and currently contains condominiums, two commercial properties, and a parking garage.

== See also ==
- Ironworks and steel mills in Pennsylvania
- National Register of Historic Places in Northampton County, Pennsylvania
