= John Osterman Gas Station =

United States historic place on Route 66 in Arizona

- U.S. National Register of Historic Places
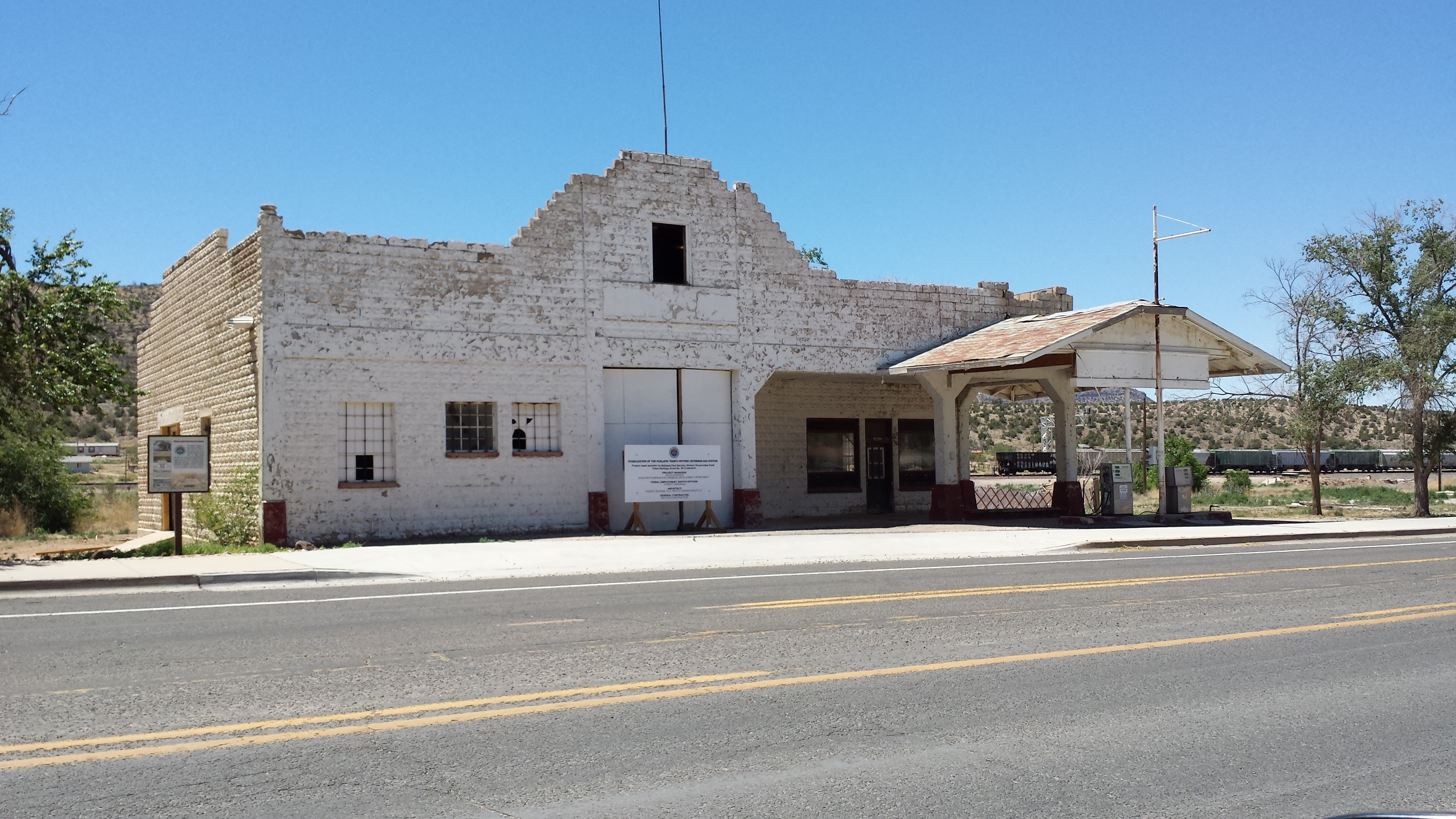

- Location within Arizona Location within the United States
- Location: 888 US 66, Peach Springs, Arizona
- Coordinates: 35°31′44″N 113°25′33″W
- Built: 1932
- Built by: Oscar Ostermann
- NRHP reference No.: 09000543
- Added to NRHP: March 15, 2012

The John Osterman Gas Station is a historic gas station on Route 66 in Peach Springs, Arizona. It was listed on the National Register of Historic Places in 2012.

It was built in 1927 or 1929 or 1932, according to various sources. According to Quinta Scott, it was built by Oscar Ostermann, John's brother, in 1932. The gas station is owned by the Hualapai Indians, who nominated it for the National Register in 2009. Apparently the group has received a National Park Service grant to restore the station.
