= Worldport (Pan Am) =

Former terminal at JFK Airport in New York City

Coordinates: 40.640555°N 73.786572°W

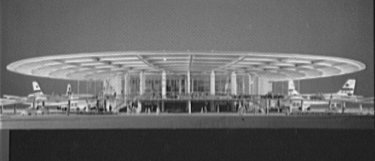
- The original configuration of the Worldport
- Alternative names: Terminal 3

General information
- Status: Demolished
- Opened: May 24, 1960; 66 years ago
- Demolished: 2013; 13 years ago
- Client: Pan American World Airways (1960–1991); Delta Air Lines (1991–2013)

Terminal 3, also known by the trademarked name Worldport, was an airport terminal at John F. Kennedy (originally New York) International Airport in Queens, New York, United States. Built by Pan American World Airways (Pan Am), the terminal operated from 1960 to 2013. It was demolished in the year after its closure.

== History ==
=== Original use ===
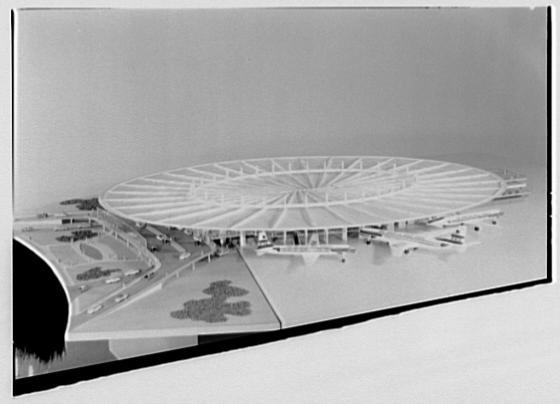
The distinctive "flying saucer" roof design of Worldport

The terminal was originally known as the "Pan Am Terminal" or Pan Am "Unit Terminal Building" (UTB). It was designed by Ives, Turano & Gardner Associated Architects and Walther Prokosch of Tippets-Abbett-McCarthy-Stratton as a showcase for international jet travel and was particularly famous for its 4-acre (1.6 ha) "flying saucer" roof projecting out from the outer columns of the terminal supported on 32 sets of pre-stressed horizontal steel posts and cables. The terminal was designed to allow for aircraft to be parked under the overhanging roof; marketing brochures promoted it as the Jet Age terminal that brought the plane to the passenger. The overhang sheltered passengers as they boarded the aircraft by stairs or by uncovered bridges. The American Institute of Architects (AIA) Guide to New York City called the terminal a "genuine architectural attempt to answer the problem of all-weather connections to the planes" but derided the overall concept as "compromised by an overabundance of distracting detail".

The building's facade originally featured zodiac figures made by sculptor Milton Hebald, although these were later removed by the Port Authority. The terminal featured the Panorama Room, a dining room with a view of the entire concourse, and the Clipper Hall museum of Pan Am history.

In 1971, the terminal was expanded to accommodate the large Boeing 747 and renamed the "Pan Am Worldport". Worldport was the world's largest airline terminal and held the title for several years.

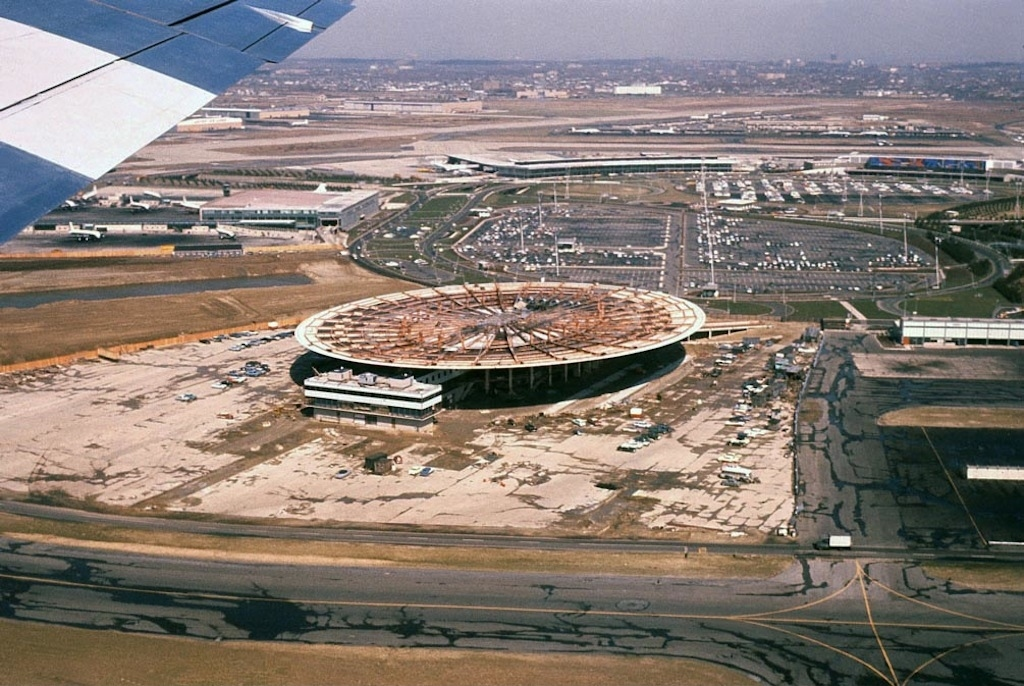
Worldport under construction

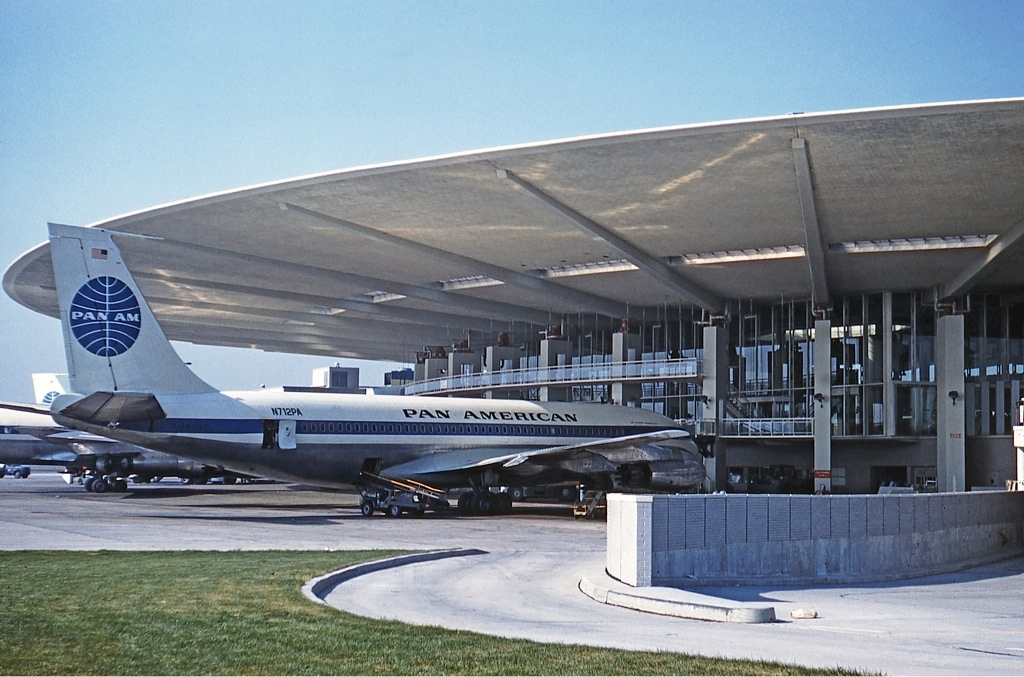
A Pan Am Boeing 707-100 at Worldport (1961)

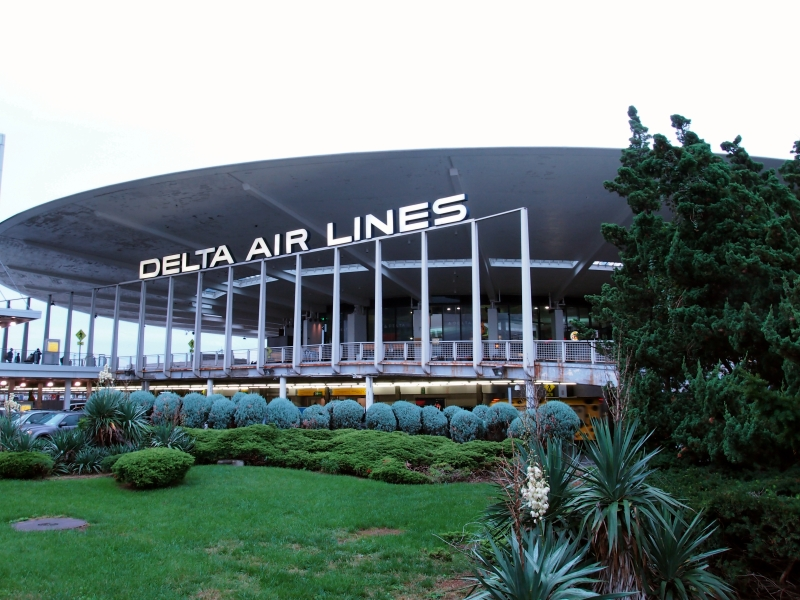
In 2012

Operation of Worldport changed hands when Pan Am declared bankruptcy in 1991. Delta Air Lines acquired many of Pan Am's assets, including the lease on Worldport, which became known simply as "Terminal 3", and operated most of its long-haul flights out of JFK to Europe, Asia, Africa, and South America from the building.

In March 2006, Delta COO Jim Whitehurst announced that Delta would spend US$10 million before the end of that year to renovate Terminal 2 and Terminal 3, including its public spaces, BusinessElite lounge, and Crown Room Clubs. In the July 2007 issue of Delta's Sky Magazine, Delta Senior Vice President Joanne Smith remarked on the "distinctive" saucer roof in an article on new flooring, lighting, and signage at this "historic airport".

=== Redevelopment and preservation campaign ===
On August 4, 2010, The New York Times reported that Delta was planning to move its international flights to Terminal 4 following the construction of nine additional gates in Concourse B of that terminal. Delta's domestic flights would continue to be operated out of Terminal 2. Terminal 3 would subsequently be demolished to create additional aircraft parking between Terminals 2 and 4. Construction of the Terminal 4 expansion began in November 2010 and was completed in May 2013.

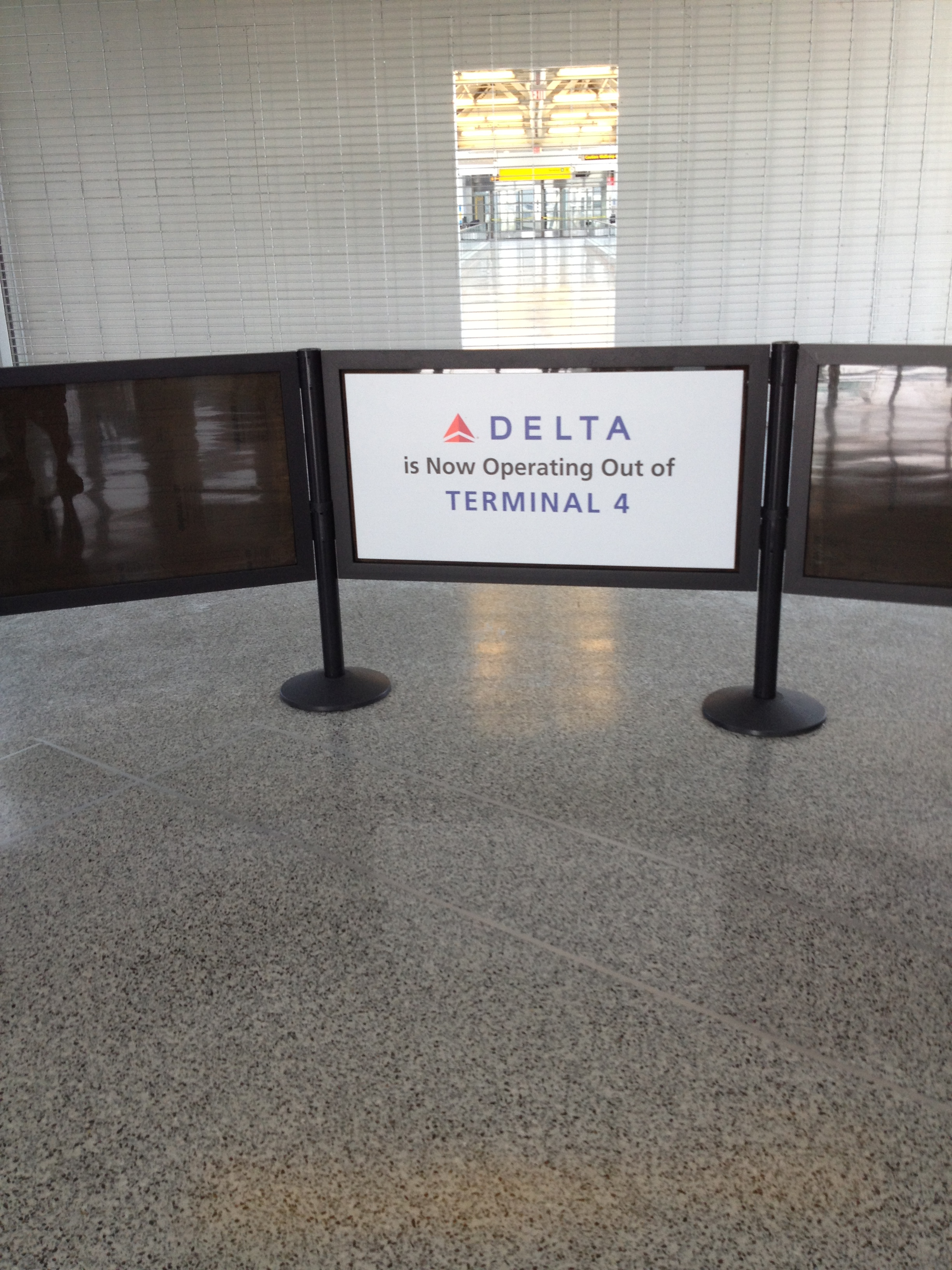
The passageway to Worldport was closed just before its demolition

On May 23, 2013, the final departure from Terminal 3, Delta Air Lines Flight 268, a Boeing 747-400 to Tel Aviv Ben Gurion Airport, departed from Gate 6 at 11:25pm local time. The terminal ceased operations on the next day, 53 years to the day from when it opened.

Preservation groups campaigned to save the building and have it nominated by the New York State Historic Preservation Office as a historic place. On June 19, 2013, Worldport was placed on the National Trust for Historic Preservation's list of eleven Most Endangered Places in America for 2013, but by June 25, 2013, demolition of the elevated roadway leading to the terminal had already begun, although preservationists continued to protest against the demolition of the building itself. The New York State Historic Preservation Office, which had revoked the building's eligibility for the National Register of Historic Places in 2001, upheld this decision in May 2013, claiming the building had lost significant historic integrity due to excessive modifications.

The preservation campaign was ultimately unsuccessful and demolition of the flying saucer roof was completed on November 22, 2013. Demolition work on the remainder of the terminal completed in summer 2014. The National Trust for Historic Preservation cited Worldport as one of ten historic sites lost in 2013.

There was subsequently a media outcry, particularly in other countries, over the demolition of Worldport. Several online petitions requesting the restoration of the original 'flying saucer' gained popularity.

== In popular culture ==
The Worldport in Live and Let Die (1973 film)

Worldport appeared in several films and publications.

- A Pan Am Boeing 747 and the Worldport briefly appear in the 1973 James Bond film Live and Let Die.
- A partially digital reconstruction of the Pan Am Terminal is featured in most episodes of the ABC television series Pan Am (2011–2012) as the show's Pan Am characters are based there.
- The September 22, 1961, issue of Life magazine featured a photo essay of JFK Airport (then known as Idlewild Airport) by Ukrainian-born photographer Dmitri Kessel. Many of the photos were of the newly built Pan Am Terminal.
