= Detroit Association of Women's Clubs Building =

- U.S. National Register of Historic Places
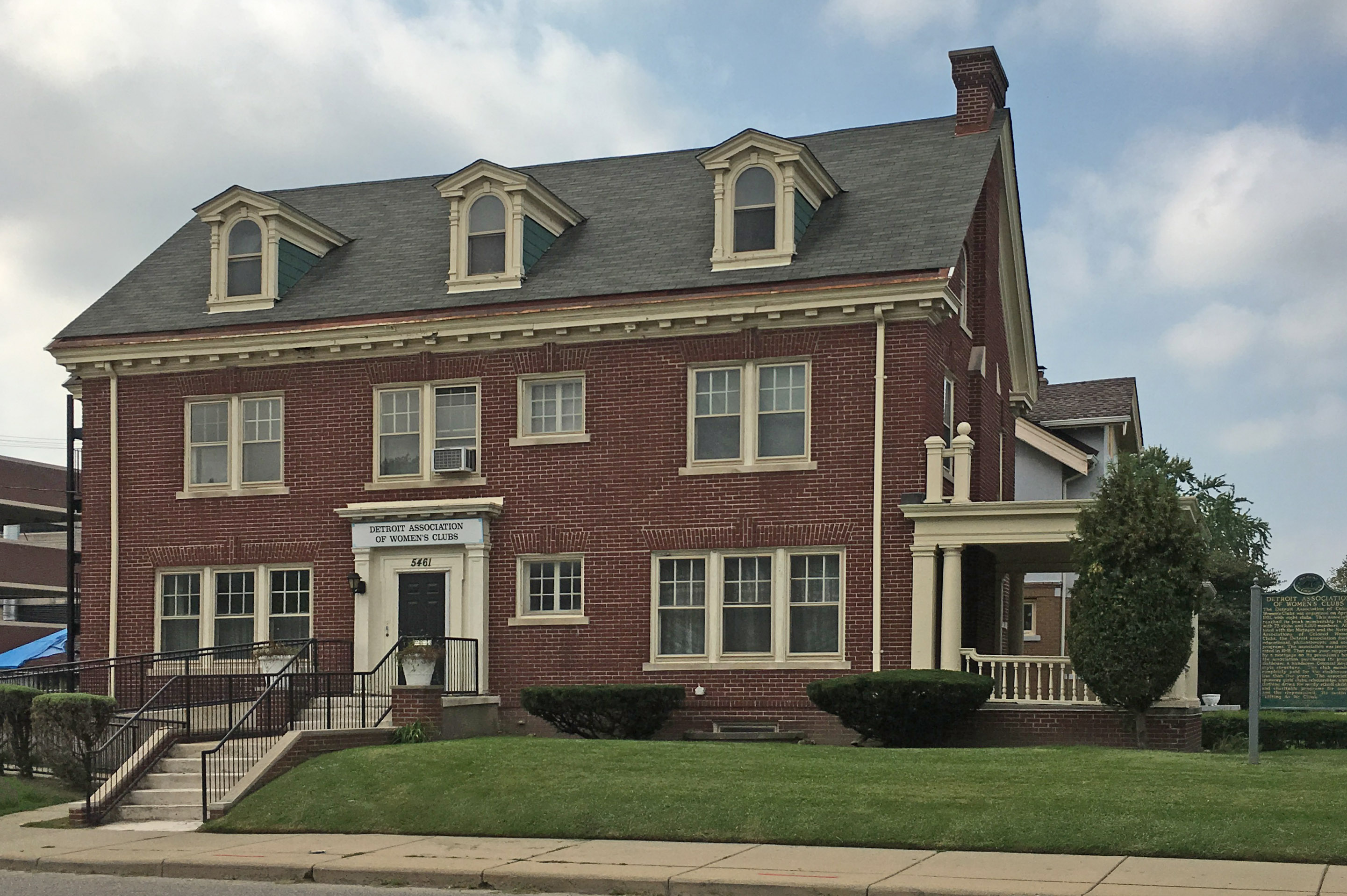
- Building in 2016
- Interactive map
- Location: 5461 Brush St. Detroit, Michigan
- Coordinates: 42°21′45″N 83°3′45″W
- Built: 1913
- Architect: Smith, Hinchman, and Grylls
- Architectural style: Colonial Revival
- MPS: The Civil Rights Movement and the African American Experience in 20th Century Detroit MPS
- NRHP reference No.: 100011153
- Added to NRHP: December 2, 2024

The Detroit Association of Women's Clubs Building is a club headquarters located at 5461 Brush Street in Detroit, Michigan, in the East Ferry Avenue Historic District. Originally built for William Lennane, it became the headquarters of the Detroit Association of Women's Clubs in 1941. The building is significant for its connection to the Detroit Association of Women's Clubs and the civil rights movement in Detroit. The house was listed on the National Register of Historic Places in December 2024.

== History ==
William Lennane was born in 1872. He owned a successful contracting firm in Detroit, specializing in concrete, paving, and sewer work. In 1913, he commissioned the architectural firm of Smith, Hinchman, and Grylls to design this house on the corner of Brush and Ferry Streets. He lived in the house until his death in 1941.

In 1921, a group of eight social welfare organizations in Detroit's Black community banded together to form what was then known as the Detroit Association of Colored Women's Clubs. In later years, more organizations joined the association, and by 1941 the association and its president, Rosa Gragg, began looking for a permanent headquarters building. Gragg discovered this house for sale, located only a block from her own home. She mortgaged her own home to collect funds to purchase the house as a new club headquarters.

However, at the time, racially restrictive covenants which did not permit Blacks to own property were in force on Ferry west of Brush Street. The house at the time had a street address of 326 East Ferry; to bypass the covenants the street address was changed to 5461 Brush. Some sources suggest that, to emphasize the address change, the former entry door located on the porch on the Ferry Avenue side of the house was bricked up at this time, However, local records indicate that this entry was bricked up much later, after a fire in 1976.

The Detroit Association of Women's Clubs continued to be successful; by 1945 the organization included 75 clubs and 3,000 members. It continued to use the house as a headquarters until the present day.

The building was listed on the National Register of Historic Places in 2024. Also that year, pipes burst in the house, causing extensive damage and leading to its closure. In 2026, the National Trust for Historic Preservation listed the location on their annual "America’s 11 Most Endangered Historic Places" due to the 2024 water damage and a lack of funding.

== Description ==
This house is a two-and-a-half story rectangular brick Colonial Revival building with a side-gabled roof covered with asphalt shingles. The main façade faces Brush Street. It has a roughly centerd main entrance with a Classical surround with pilasters and cornice. A single window is to the side; the window and door are flanked by tripled windows. The second floor contains three sets of paired windows, centered above the windows and doors of the first floor, as well as a smaller single window. Three gabled dormers with single round-arched windows are in the roof. A single story porch extends across a part of the Ferry Street elevation.
