= Swansea Friends Meeting House and Cemetery =

Historic site in Somerset, Massachusetts

- U.S. National Register of Historic Places
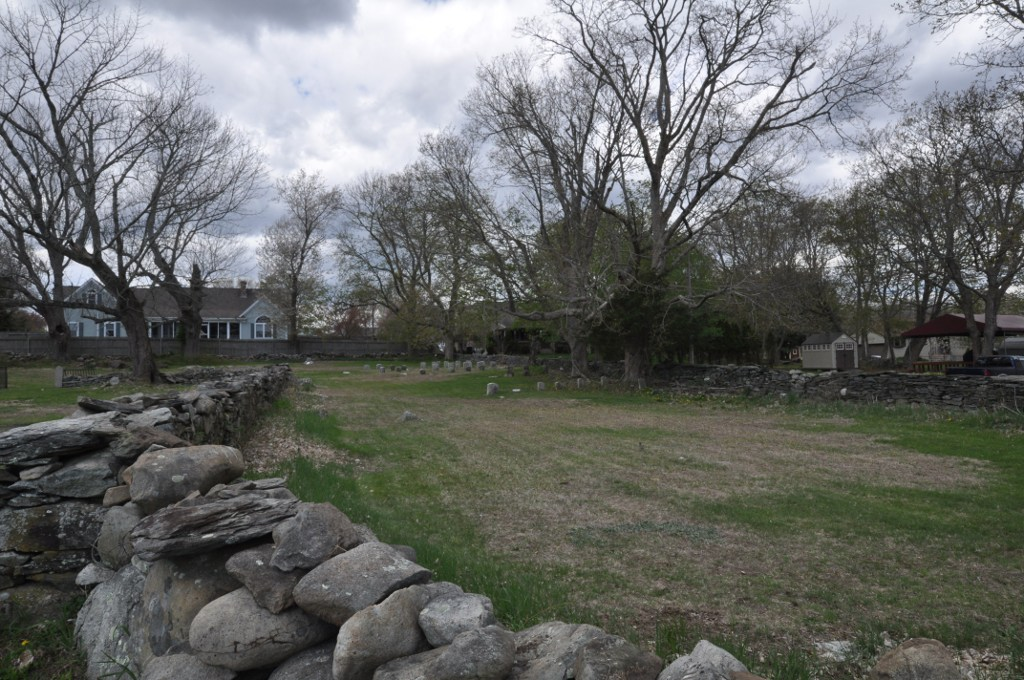

- Location within Massachusetts Location within the United States
- Location: 223 Prospect St., Somerset, Massachusetts
- Coordinates: 41.738713°N 71.156922°W
- Area: less than one acre
- Built: 1702
- Architectural style: Georgian
- NRHP reference No.: 14000156
- Added to NRHP: April 15, 2014

The Swansea Friends Meeting House and Cemetery, at 223 Prospect Street in Somerset, Massachusetts, are a pair of religious properties believed to include the oldest extant Quaker meetinghouse in the state, with the oldest surviving meetinghouse form in which the pulpit and entrance face each other across the building's short dimension (instead of the 19th century form, where they stand at opposite ends of the long dimension). The oldest portion of the building dates to 1702, when Somerset was part of Swansea. Originally only 24 feet (7.3 m) wide, the building was significantly enlarged in 1746, adding side bays and a second floor gallery. In the 19th century the balconies were closed off to provide office space. The cemetery adjacent to the meetinghouse is also believed to be of great age; its oldest dated marker is 1831, but 18th century Quaker practice did not generally include the laying of markers, so there are likely a number of unmarked early graves.

The property was listed on the National Register of Historic Places in 2014. In 2026, the National Trust for Historic Preservation listed the building, which has been closed for several years in need of rehabilitation, on their annual "America’s 11 Most Endangered Historic Places."

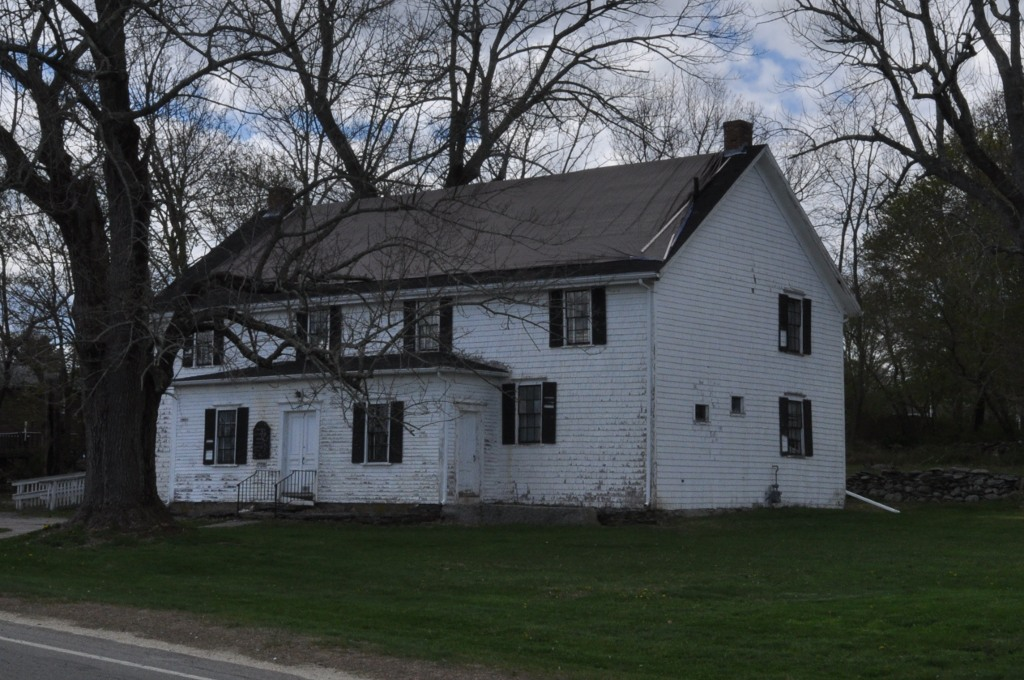

== See also ==
- National Register of Historic Places listings in Bristol County, Massachusetts
