= Picture Cave =

Cave in Missouri, US

- Location: Warren County, Missouri
- Discovery: Pre-Columbian
- Geology: Limestone

Picture Cave is a cave in Warren County, Missouri containing a large array of Native American wall paintings, from which it takes its name. It has been described as “the most important rock art site in North America.” A total of 296 prehistoric glyphs are present on the cave walls. The cave features drawings of people, animals, birds and mythical creatures, with intricately detailed clothing, headressess, feather, and weapons, according to Dr. Carol Diaz-Granádos of Washington University. The site was resided in and used for rituals and burials by the ancestors of the Osage, Omaha, Ponca, Quapaw, and Kaw beginning at least by 1000 CE, as part of the broader Mississippian cultural complex.

In 2021 the cave was sold to an undisclosed buyer for over $2.2 million dollars despite the objections of the Osage Nation as supported by The Conservation Fund, which had collected $2 million for the sale. Public records list the buyer as Morning Star and His Friends, LLC of Nashville, Tennessee as represented by National Registered Agents of Knoxville, Tennessee.
