= Moving to Work =

Moving to Work (MTW) is a demonstration program for public housing authorities (PHAs) that provides them the opportunity to design and test innovative, locally designed strategies that use Federal dollars more efficiently, help residents find employment and become self-sufficient, and increase housing choices for low-income families. MTW gives PHAs exemptions from many existing public housing and voucher rules and more flexibility with how they use their Federal funds. PHAs can use special funding formulas for MTW agencies and permit agencies to shift funds between the programs or to other uses.

The program is operated by 39 PHAs nationwide.

== History ==
The Moving to Work (MTW) Demonstration program was authorized by the Omnibus Consolidated Rescissions and Appropriations Act of 1996.

There are currently 39 MTW public housing agencies. Each agency has an agency-specific contract with the Department of Housing and Urban Development (HUD), called the MTW Standard Agreement. The MTW Standard Agreement details the flexibilities granted to MTW agencies in order to meet program and statutory goals. In 2016, at the direction of Congress, HUD provided an extension of the Standard Agreements until the end of each agency's 2028 fiscal year.

The current 39 MTW agencies are:

- Alaska Housing Finance Corporation
- Atlanta Housing
- Housing Authority of Baltimore City
- Boulder Housing Partners
- Cambridge Housing Authority
- Housing Authority of Champaign County
- INLIVIAN (Charlotte Housing Authority)
- Chicago Housing Authority
- Housing Authority of Columbus, Georgia
- Delaware State Housing
- DC Housing Authority
- Fairfax County and Redevelopment Authority
- Holyoke Housing Authority
- Keene Housing
- King County Housing Authority
- Lawrence-Douglas County Housing Authority
- Lexington Housing Authority
- Lincoln Housing Authority
- Louisville Housing Authority
- Massachusetts Department of Housing & Community Development
- Minneapolis Public Housing Authority
- Elm City Communities (New Haven)
- Oakland Housing Authority
- Orlando Housing Authority
- Philadelphia Housing Authority
- Housing Authority of the City of Pittsburgh
- Portage Metropolitan Housing Authority
- Home Forward (Portland)
- Housing Authority of the City of Reno
- San Antonio Housing Authority
- Housing Authority of the County of San Bernardino
- San Diego Housing Commission
- Housing Authority of the County of San Mateo
- Housing Authority of the County of Santa Clara (including City of San Jose)
- Seattle Housing Authority
- Tacoma Housing Authority
- Housing Authority of Tulare County
- Vancouver Housing Authority

== 2018 renewal ==
HUD announced that it plans various changes to MTW beginning in 2019:

- End preferential funding formulas for some MTW agencies, replaced by equitable funding to all agencies that operate public housing.
- Require agencies to use at least 90 percent of their voucher funds for vouchers, rather than repurposing them.
- Possibly raise the total number of families that MTW agencies must assist.
- Require added evaluation of new MTW policies that pose the greatest risks for low-income families, such as major rent changes, restrictions on where families can live, time limits and work requirements.

== Office of Public Housing Investments ==
The Office of Public Housing Investments (OPHI), within the Office of Public and Indian Housing (PIH) at HUD headquarters, oversees the MTW Demonstration.

== Funding formulas ==
=== Block grants ===
MTW agencies can combine Operating and Capital funds and Housing Choice Voucher funds and use them interchangeably. For example, an MTW agency could use public housing capital funds to issue additional vouchers or use voucher funds to develop more public housing to better fit the needs of its community. Agencies can funds innovative policies. For instance, an MTW Agency can use funds from its block grant to replace decaying public housing with mixed-income communities, increase the percentage of project-based vouchers to bring more affordable housing to compact markets, and reach special needs populations through the use of provider-based vouchers paired with supportive services.

However MTWs must "assist substantially the same total number of eligible low-income families as would have been served had the funding amounts not been combined."

Eleven PHAs operate under modified funding formulas that allow them to receive (2013) $7,900 per unit, versus $4,100 for the other 28. Some MTW agencies use voucher funds for other purposes, including renovation, developing new housing, providing services to housing assistance recipients, supplementing agency budgets for administration and operations, or accumulating reserves. Government Accountability Office studies have found that developing new affordable housing is generally less efficient than providing vouchers for use in the private housing market.
