= Miss Universe Trinidad and Tobago =

National beauty pageant competition in Trinidad and Tobago

The Miss Universe Trinidad and Tobago Organization
- Formation: 1963; 63 years ago
- Type: Beauty pageant
- Headquarters: Port of Spain
- Location: Trinidad and Tobago
- Members: Miss Universe
- Official language: English
- President: Stephen Jones
- Website: crownsandsashestt.com

Miss Universe Trinidad and Tobago is a national beauty pageant held annually since 1963, a year after Trinidad and Tobago's independence from the United Kingdom. The contest is meant to select a suitable delegate from both islands to compete in the Miss Universe pageant.

== History ==
Trinidad debuted at Miss Universe in 1963, at which time the country used 'Trinidad' at its title. The first candidate was Jean Stodart, who competed at Miss Universe 1963 in the United States. Beginning in 1966, the country began to compete as 'Trinidad and Tobago' at the Miss Universe pageant.

== International winners ==
The country's representative in 1977, Janelle “Penny” Commissiong, became the first person of African ethnicity to win the Miss Universe contest, which was hosted in Santo Domingo, Dominican Republic.

In 1998 Wendy Fitzwilliam captured the Miss Universe title in Hawaii, USA, becoming the second contestant from the country to win the title.

== Miss Universe 1999 ==
In May, 1999, the Miss Universe pageant was hosted at the Chaguaramas Convention Centre in Chaguaramas, Trinidad and Tobago. A record 84 nations were represented. The winner that year was Mpule Kwelagobe of Botswana. This was also the first time that two women of African descent won on consecutive occasions, with the prior year's winner being Wendy Fitzwilliam of Trinidad and Tobago.

== Titleholders ==
- : Declared as Winner
- : Ended as runner-up or top 5/6 qualification
- : Ended as one of the finalists or semifinalists
- : Ended as special awards winner

The winner of Miss Universe Trinidad and Tobago represents her country at the Miss Universe pageant. On occasion, when the winner does not qualify (due to age) for either contest, a runner-up is sent. Trinidad & Tobago has had two Miss Universe winners since the pageant's inception in 1952.

Year	Region	Miss Trinidad/Tobago	Placement at Miss Universe	Special Award(s)	Notes
2026	San Juan–Laventille	Vinita Manoo	TBA		Appointed by the national organization.
2025	Chaguanas	Latifah Morris	Unplaced		Latifah assumed her national title after the original winner, Sihlé Letren, respectively, resigned from her roles.
2024	Morvant	Jenelle Thongs	Unplaced	Miss Congeniality	
2023	San Fernando	Faith Gillezeau	Unplaced		
2022	Arouca	Tya Jané Ramey	Top 16		Crowns and Sashes Academy T&T - Stephen Jones directorship.
Did not compete between 2018—2021
2017	San Fernando	Yvonne Clarke	Unplaced		Miss Universe Trinidad and Tobago Organization — Jenny Douglass directorship.
Did not compete between 2015—2016
2014	Diego Martin	Jevon King	Unplaced		
2013	Port of Spain	Catherine Miller	Unplaced	Best National Costume (1st Runner-up)	
2012	San Juan–Laventille	Avionne Mark	Unplaced		Dean Ackin Directorship
2011	Port of Spain	Gabrielle Walcott	Unplaced	Best National Costume (5th Runner-up)	Ian Lee directorship.
2010	Couva–Tabaquite–Talparo	La Toya Woods	Unplaced		Lia Marie Guavara (CNN TV6) directorship.
2009	Did not compete				
2008	Port of Spain	Anya Ayoung-Chee	Unplaced		Miss Trinidad and Tobago held by TallMan Foundation.
2007	Did not compete				
2006	Tunapuna–Piarco	Kenisha Thom	Top 10	Best National Costume (Top 20)	Miss Trinidad and Tobago 2004 1st Runner-up and before appointing Thom competed at Miss World 2004 — Miss World 2004.
2005	Tunapuna–Piarco	Magdalene Walcott	Top 15		Appointed after the Miss Trinidad and Tobago 2004, Cherly Ankrah withdrew for personal reasons.
2005	Port of Spain	Cheryl Ankrah	Did not compete		Withdrawal — Did not compete after being accused of not fulfilling her duties and becoming overweight.
2004	Port of Spain	Danielle Jones	4th Runner-up	Best National Costume (Top 10)	
2003	San Fernando	Faye Alibocus	Top 10		
2002	Princes Town	Nasma Mohammed	Unplaced		
2001	Tunapuna–Piarco	Alexia Charlerie	Unplaced		
2000	Port of Spain	Heidi Ann Rostant	Unplaced		
1999	Diego Martin	Nicole Simone Dyer	Unplaced	Best National Costume	Miss Universe 1999 held in Trinidad and Tobago for the first time in history.
1998	Diego Martin	Wendy Fitzwilliam	Miss Universe 1998	Best National Costume	
1997	Tunapuna–Piarco	Margot Rita Bourgeois	2nd Runner-up		
1996	Princes Town	Michelle Khan	Unplaced		
1995	Port of Spain	Arlene Peterkin	Top 6		
1994	Couva–Tabaquite–Talparo	Lorca Chelsea Gatcliffe	Unplaced		
1993	Tobago	Rachel Charles	Unplaced		
1992	Did not compete				
1991	San Juan–Laventille	Josie Ann Richards	Unplaced		
1990	Port of Spain	Maryse De Gourville	Unplaced		
1989	Port of Spain	Guenevere Helen Kelshall	Unplaced		
1988	Port of Spain	Cheryl Ann Gordon	Unplaced		
1987	San Fernando	Sheree Ann Denise Richards	Unplaced		
1986	Port of Spain	Candace Jennings	Unplaced		
1985	San Juan–Laventille	Brenda Joy Fahey	Unplaced		
1984	Port of Spain	Gina Maria Tardieu	Unplaced		
1983	Tunapuna-Piarco	Sandra William	Unplaced		
1982	Port of Spain	Suzanne Traboulay	Unplaced		
1981	San Fernando	Rohini Samaroo	Unplaced		
1980	Port of Spain	Althea Ingrid Rocke	Unplaced		
1979	Port of Spain	Marie Noelle Diaz	Unplaced		
1978	Port of Spain	Sophia Titus	Unplaced	Miss Congeniality	
1977	Port of Spain	Janelle Commissiong	Miss Universe 1977	Miss Photogenic	
1976	Couva–Tabaquite–Talparo	Margaret Elizabeth McFarlane	Unplaced	Miss Congeniality	
1975	Tunapuna–Piarco	Christine Mary Jackson	Unplaced	Miss Congeniality	
1974	Port of Spain	Stephanie Lee Pack	Unplaced		
1973	San Fernando	Camella King	Unplaced		
1972	Did not compete				
1971	San Fernando	Sally Karamath	Unplaced		
Did not compete between 1967—1970
1966	Port of Spain	Kathleen Hares	Unplaced		Miss Trinidad and Tobago supported by Ministry of community Development Culture and The Arts.
Miss Trinidad
1965	Did not compete				
1964	Port of Spain	Julia Merlene Laurence	Unplaced		The last Miss Universe Trinidad as "Trinidad" representative.
1963	San Fernando	Jean Stodart	Unplaced		Queen Carnival by National Carnival Committee (NCC).

== See also ==
- Miss Trinidad and Tobago
