= Tya Jané Ramey =

- Born: Tya Jané La Shon Ramey; Brooklyn, New York City, United States
- Education: Bishop Anstey High School East; University of the West Indies
- Height: 1.80 m (5 ft 11 in)
- Beauty pageant titleholder
- Title: Miss Trinidad and Tobago 2019; Miss World Caribbean 2019; Miss Universe Trinidad and Tobago 2022
- Hair color: Black
- Major competitions: Miss Trinidad and Tobago 2019 (Winner); Miss World 2019 (Top 40) (Miss World Caribbean); Miss Universe Trinidad and Tobago 2022 (Winner); Miss Universe 2022 (Top 16)

Tya Jané La Shon Ramey is a Trinidadian beauty pageant titleholder who won the title of Miss Universe Trinidad and Tobago 2022 and represented her country at the Miss Universe 2022 pageant, where she placed among the Top 16 semi-finalists, making her the first Trinidadian to place at Miss Universe after 16 years, when Kenisha Thom placed Top 10 at Miss Universe 2006. Previously, she was crowned Miss Trinidad and Tobago 2019 on June 16, 2019 and represented Trinidad and Tobago at Miss World 2019 on December 14, 2019. She entered the Top 40 final and won the title Miss World Caribbean 2019.

== Pageantry ==
=== Miss Trinidad and Tobago 2019 ===
On June 16, 2019, Ramey represented Five Rivers at Miss Trinidad and Tobago 2019 at the Naparima Bowl auditorium in San Fernando, Trinidad and Tobago and won her title.

=== Miss World 2019 ===
On December 14, 2019, Ramey represented Trinidad and Tobago at the Miss World 2019 pageant and competed against 110 other candidates at the ExCeL London in London, England. She ultimately finished in the Top 40 and was later named Miss World Caribbean 2019 as the highest placing delegate from the Caribbean region aside from Toni-Ann Singh of Jamaica, who won the Miss World 2019 pageant.

=== Miss Universe Trinidad and Tobago 2022 ===
On September 11, 2022, Ramey represented Arouca at Miss Trinidad and Tobago 2022 and competed against 24 other candidates at the Queen's Hall in St. Ann's, Port of Spain, Trinidad and Tobago. She won the title and succeeded Yvonne Clarke.

=== Miss Universe 2022 ===
Ramey represented Trinidad and Tobago at Miss Universe 2022 at New Orleans Morial Convention Center, New Orleans, Louisiana, U.S. on January 13, 2022. In the end, she placed in the Top 16.

Awards and achievements
Preceded by Ysabel Bisnath	Miss Trinidad and Tobago; 2019	Succeeded by Jeanine Brandt
Preceded by (Jamaica) Kadijah Robinson	Miss World Caribbean; 2019	Succeeded by (Dominican Republic) Emmy Peña
Preceded by Yvonne Clarke	Miss Universe Trinidad and Tobago; 2022	Succeeded by Faith Gillezeau
