= Project Runway season 9 =

Project Runway
- Season 9
- No. of tasks: 12
- No. of contestants: 20
- Winner: Anya Ayoung-Chee
- No. of episodes: 14

Release
- Original network: Lifetime
- Original release: July 28 – October 27, 2011

Season chronology
- ← Previous; Season 8 Next → Season 10

The ninth season of the television show Project Runway began airing on July 28, 2011, and featured 20 designers who hope to become "the next great American designer." Returning as judges were supermodel Heidi Klum; fashion designer Michael Kors; and Marie Claire fashion director, Nina Garcia. Tim Gunn returned as the workroom mentor.

In 2012, Laura Kathleen Planck, Joshua McKinley, and Anthony Ryan Auld competed in the second season of Project Runway All Stars. Laura Kathleen Planck placed 6th, Joshua McKinley placed 4th, and Anthony Ryan Auld won the competition.

In 2013, Viktor Luna competed in the third season of All-Stars. He placed 5th.

In 2018, Kimberly Goldson and Joshua McKinley (in his second All Stars appearance) competed in the sixth season of All Stars, placing 9th and 7th respectively.

Anthony Ryan Auld, alongside Anya Ayoung-Chee, competed in the seventh season against worldwide winners. Anya Ayoung-Chee placed 10th while Anthony Ryan Auld placed 5th.

In 2023, Viktor Luna competed in Project Runway (season 20). He placed 12th out of 14.

== Contestants ==
Contestant	Age	Hometown	Finish	Outcome
Amanda Perna	25	Ft. Lauderdale, Florida	Episode 1	17th place
David Chum	29	Morong, Philippines	Episode 1	17th place
Gunnar Deatherage	21	La Grange, Kentucky	Episode 1	17th place
Serena da Conceicao	31	Kingston, New York	Episode 1	17th place
Rafael Cox	27	Alamogordo, New Mexico	Episode 1	16th place
Fallene Wells	29	Las Vegas, Nevada	Episode 3	15th place
Julie Tierney	35	Baton Rouge, Louisiana	Episode 4	14th place
Cecilia Motwani	34	Cordoba, Argentina	Episode 5	13th place
Danielle Everine	26	Minneapolis, Minnesota	Episode 5	12th place
Joshua Christensen	29	Snohomish, Washington	Episode 6	11th place
Becky Ross	38	Calumet, Michigan	Episode 7	10th place
Bryce Black	26	Twin Falls, Idaho	Episode 8	9th place
Olivier Green	22	Columbus, Ohio	Episode 9	8th place
Anthony Ryan Auld	28	Linden, Texas	Episode 10	7th place
Bert Keeter	57	Washington, D.C.	Episode 11	6th place
Laura Kathleen Planck	26	St. Louis, Missouri	Episode 12	5th place
Kimberly Goldson	35	Brooklyn, New York	Episode 14	4th place
Viktor Luna	30	Guadalajara, Jalisco	Episode 14	3rd place
Joshua McKinley	25	Cleveland, Ohio	Episode 14	Runner-up
Anya Ayoung-Chee	29	Port of Spain, Trinidad and Tobago	Episode 14	Winner

In the first episode, 4 designers were eliminated and 16 continued to participate in the show.

=== Models ===
Model	Place Finished
Kenzie Gallo	16th place
Ashley Lacamp	15th place
Tatjana Sinkevica	14th place
Thais Magalhaes	13th place
Michel Ann Lienhard-O'Malley	12th place
Karin Agstam	11th place
Alyssa Pasek	10th place
Hannah Gottesman	9th place
Carla Barrucci	8th place
Chelsea Blackburn	7th place
Kerstin Lechner	6th place
Meghan Giffin	5th place
Bojana Draskovic	4th place
Erika Kimberly Jones	3rd place
Sonia Nieklasz	Runner-up
Sveta Glebova	Winner

== Elimination Table ==
Designer Elimination Table
Designers	1 ^{1}	2	3	4	5 ^{2} ^{3}	6	7	8	9	10 ^{4}	11	12	13^{5}	14	Eliminated Episode
Anya	HIGH	IN	IN	HIGH	HIGH	IN	WIN	HIGH	LOW	WIN	WIN	WIN	ADV	WINNER	14 – Finale, Part 2
Joshua M.	IN	HIGH	LOW	IN	WIN	HIGH	LOW	WIN	IN	LOW	HIGH	HIGH	ADV	RUNNER-UP	14 – Finale, Part 2
Viktor	IN	IN	LOW	HIGH	WIN	IN	HIGH	HIGH	WIN	HIGH	LOW	HIGH	ADV	3RD PLACE	14 – Finale, Part 2
Kimberly	IN	IN	HIGH	WIN	IN	IN	LOW	IN	LOW	IN	HIGH	LOW	ADV	4TH PLACE	14 – Finale, Part 2
Laura Kathleen	IN	IN	WIN	IN	LOW	HIGH	LOW	IN	HIGH	LOW	LOW	OUT			12 – The Finale Challenge
Bert	WIN	IN	LOW	IN	LOW	LOW	LOW	LOW	HIGH	HIGH	OUT				11 – This Is for the Birds
Anthony Ryan	HIGH	HIGH	HIGH	IN	LOW	WIN	HIGH	LOW	IN	OUT					10 – Sew '70s
Olivier	IN	WIN	IN	IN	HIGH	LOW	HIGH	IN	OUT						9 – Image Is Everything
Bryce	IN	LOW	LOW	IN	IN	IN	HIGH	OUT							8 – What Women Want
Becky	IN	IN	HIGH	IN	HIGH	IN	OUT								7 – Can't We All Just Get Along?
Joshua C.	LOW	OUT			HIGH	OUT									2 – My Pet Project/6 – The Art of the Matter
Danielle	IN	IN	HIGH	LOW	OUT										5 – Off the Track
Cecilia	IN	IN	HIGH	LOW	WD										5 – Off the Track
Julie	LOW	IN	LOW	OUT											4 – All About Nina
Fallene	IN	LOW	OUT												3 – Go Big or Go Home
Rafael	OUT														1 – Come As You Are
Amanda	OUT														1 – Come As You Are
David	OUT														1 – Come As You Are
Gunnar	OUT														1 – Come As You Are
Serena	OUT														1 – Come As You Are

^1: In episode 1, Amanda, David, Gunnar, and Serena were the 4 designers who were eliminated before the final 16 were officially participants of the show.
^2: After Cecilia withdrew from the competition in episode 5, Olivier and Viktor were allowed to pick any previously eliminated contestant to come back into the competition to join their team. They chose Joshua C.
^3: In episode 5, although the judges categorized all the clothes into ones they liked and didn't like, their deliberation revealed the ones they liked the most (Bryce, Joshua M., Viktor) and the ones they liked the least (Anthony, Danielle, Olivier). In addition, although Joshua M. was chosen as a winner, the actual winning design from his team was the dress designed and sewn by Anya and Becky, respectively.
^4: In episode 10, the prize was that the winning designer's garment would be produced and sold on Piperlime. After Anya was declared the winner, it was announced that Bert's garment will also be produced and sold on the site.
^5: All four contestants went on to compete at Fashion Week, for the first time since season 3.

The designer won the Project Runway Season 9.
The designer won the challenge.
The designer was in the top two, or the first announced into the top 3, but did not win.
The designer had one of the highest scores for that challenge, but did not win.
The designer had one of the lowest scores for that challenge, but was not eliminated.
The designer was in the bottom two, but was not eliminated.
The designer lost and was out of the competition.
The designer was not in the Top 16 and was out of the competition.
The designer withdrew from the competition.

Model Elimination Table
Model	1	2	3^{1}	4	5	6	7	8^{1}	9^{1}	10	11	12	13	14
Sveta	AC	AC	–	AC	AC	BR	BR	–	–	AC	AC	AC	AC	WINNER (AC)
Sonia	JM	JM	–	JM	JM	JM	JM	–	–	JM	JM	JM	JM	JM
Erika	VL	VL	–	VL	VL	VL	VL	–	–	VL	VL	VL	VL	VL
Bojana	KG	KG	–	KG	KG	KG	KG	–	–	KG	KG	KG	KG	KG
Meghan	BR	BR	–	BR	BR	LK	LK	–	–	LK	LK	LK	OUT	
Kerstin	BK	BK	–	BK	BK	AC	AC	–	–	BK	BK	OUT		
Chelsea	AA	AA	–	AA	AA	AA	AA	–	–	AA	OUT			
Carla	OG	OG	–	OG	OG	OG	OG	–	–	OUT				
Hannah	BB	BB	–	BB	BB	BB	BB	–	–	OUT				
Alyssa	CM	CM	–	CM	JC	BK	BK	–	–	OUT				
Karin	DE	DE	–	DE	DE	JC	OUT							
Michel Ann	LK	LK	–	LK	LK	OUT								
Thais	JT	JT	–	JT	OUT									
Tatjana	FW	FW	–	OUT										
Ashley	JC	JC	–	OUT										
Kenzie	RC	OUT												

The model won Project Runway Season 9.
The model wore the winning design that challenge.
The model wore the losing design that challenge.
The model was eliminated.

^1: The models were not used in Episodes 3, 8 & 9

Designer legend

- Anthony Ryan Auld: AA
- Anya Ayoung-Chee: AC
- Bryce Black: BB
- Bert Keeter: BK
- Becky Ross: BR
- Cecilia Motwani: CM
- Danielle Everine: DE
- Fallene Wells: FW
- Joshua Christensen: JC
- Joshua McKinley: JM
- Julie Tierney: JT
- Kimberly Goldson: KG
- Laura Kathleen: LK
- Olivier Green: OG
- Rafael Cox: RC
- Viktor Luna: VL

== Episodes ==
=== Episode 1: Come As You Are ===
Original Airdate: July 28, 2011

As the season begins and the designers arrive in New York, they are informed that they are not yet part of season 9. For the final stage of their casting session, the 20 designers must go in front of Heidi, Michael, Nina and Tim to make a case as to why they deserve one of the 16 coveted spots this season.

ELIMINATED: Amanda, David, Gunnar & Serena

The next day, the 16 remaining designers are awoken by Tim at 5 o'clock in the early morning and given their first challenge: transform the pajamas they are wearing and one bed sheet into an outfit of their choice. Dyes, trim, and closures are provided.

- Judges: Heidi Klum, Nina Garcia, Michael Kors
- Guest Judge: Christina Ricci

WINNER: Bert
ELIMINATED: Rafael

- Amanda has returned for season 14.
- Gunnar has returned for season 10.

=== Episode 2: My Pet Project ===
Original Airdate: August 4, 2011

The designers must create an outfit using only materials found in a pet supply store.

- Judges: Heidi Klum, Nina Garcia, Michael Kors
- Guest Judge: Stacey Bendet

WINNER: Olivier
ELIMINATED: Joshua C.

=== Episode 3: Go Big or Go Home ===
Original Airdate: August 11, 2011

The designers work on a challenge revolving around a theme called "Larger than Life". In teams of two with a budget of $500 and one day to work, they create outfits for professional stilt walkers. The runway show is at Battery Park, making it the first runway show to be held outside.

Pairs: Anthony Ryan & Laura, Bryce & Fallene, Danielle & Cecilia, Joshua M. & Julie, Viktor & Bert, Anya & Olivier, and Kimberly & Becky

Team	Result
Anthony Ryan/Laura	High/Win
Danielle/Cecilia	High/High
Kimberly/Becky	High/High
Anya/Olivier	In/In
Joshua M/Julie	Low/Low
Viktor/Bert	Low/Low
Bryce/Fallene	Low/Out

- Judges: Heidi Klum, Nina Garcia, Michael Kors
- Guest Judge: Kim Kardashian

WINNER: Laura
ELIMINATED: Fallene

=== Episode 4: All About Nina ===
Original Airdate: August 18, 2011

The designers create a look for judge Nina Garcia that should be wearable by Garcia during work and for an industry event at night. The winning design will be featured in a Marie Claire editorial and on a billboard atop a New York City taxicab.

- Judges: Heidi Klum, Nina Garcia, Michael Kors
- Guest Judge: Kerry Washington, Joanna Coles (Editor in Chief of Marie Claire)

WINNER: Kimberly
ELIMINATED: Julie

=== Episode 5: Off the Track ===
Original Airdate: August 25, 2011

The designers meet at the New Balance Track and Field Center in New York City and are challenged to create apparel to wear with a new Heidi Klum for New Balance lifestyle sneaker from Klum's collection. The designers work in teams of three, with team leaders chosen by holding a foot race at the Track and Field Center. The winning looks will be sold as part of Klum's collection exclusively on Amazon.com.

Team Leader	Team Members
Anthony Ryan	Laura, Bert
Joshua M.	Anya, Becky
Viktor	Olivier, Josh C.
Bryce	Kimberly, Danielle

- Judges: Heidi Klum, Nina Garcia, Michael Kors
- Guest Judge: Erin Wasson

WINNERS: Joshua M. and Viktor
WITHDREW: Cecilia
ELIMINATED: Danielle

Cecilia withdrew from the competition and was replaced by Josh C.

=== Episode 6: The Art of the Matter ===
Original Airdate: September 1, 2011

The designers each work together with an art student to create a painting, and then must design an avant-garde look that reflects their art work. They have a budget of $300 and two days to complete their look.

- Judges: Heidi Klum, Michael Kors
- Guest Judge: Kenneth Cole, Zanna Roberts Rassi (in for Nina Garcia)

WINNER: Anthony Ryan
ELIMINATED: Joshua C.

=== Episode 7: Can't We Just All Get Along? ===
Original Airdate: September 8, 2011

The designers plug into computer technology to help create signature fabric designs in a challenge that forces them into working in two teams of five. Wielding video cameras, they also venture out into the city to capture the stories behind their inspirations.

Team CHAOS	Team Nuts And Bolts
Anthony Ryan, Anya, Viktor, Olivier, Bryce	Josh M., Laura, Kimberly, Becky, Bert

- Judges: Heidi Klum, Nina Garcia, Michael Kors
- Guest Judge: Rachel Roy, Rose Byrne

WINNER: Anya
ELIMINATED: Becky

=== Episode 8: What Women Want ===
Original Airdate: September 15, 2011

The contestants are introduced to nine men on the runway and, in a seamless twist, discover they must design for the men's significant others. Actress Malin Akerman is the guest judge.

- Judges: Heidi Klum, Nina Garcia, Michael Kors
- Guest Judge: Malin Akerman

WINNER: Joshua M.
ELIMINATED: Bryce

=== Episode 9: Image is Everything ===
Original Airdate: September 22, 2011

The outfitters are treated to a special performance from their new client, the up-and-coming band The Sheepdogs. Broken into two teams of four, the designers are charged with creating a look that will establish them as image-makers.

- Judges: Heidi Klum, Nina Garcia, Michael Kors
- Guest Judge: Adam Lambert

WINNER: Viktor
ELIMINATED: Olivier

=== Episode 10: Sew 70s ===
Original Airdate: September 29, 2011

The remaining designers do the time warp when fashions from the 1970s inspire their creations.

- Judges: Heidi Klum, Nina Garcia, Michael Kors
- Guest Judge: Olivia Palermo

WINNER: Anya
ELIMINATED: Anthony Ryan

=== Episode 11: This is for the Birds ===
Original Airdate: October 6, 2011

Birds serve as the inspiration for the looks in this challenge. Designers are paired up, with each pair assigned a bird. They then learn that they are not competing together, but rather head-to-head. Kimberly and Viktor design head-to-head with a cockatoo as their inspiration, Anya and Laura with a raven, and Bert and Joshua with an Amazon parrot.

- Judges: Heidi Klum, Nina Garcia, Michael Kors
- Guest Judge: Francisco Costa

WINNER: Anya
ELIMINATED: Bert

=== Episode 12: The Finale Challenge ===
Original Airdate: October 13, 2011

The remaining designers had to create 3 looks from inspirations on Governor's Island. They were assisted by the five most recently eliminated contestants.

- Judges: Heidi Klum, Nina Garcia, Michael Kors
- Guest Judge: Zoe Saldaña

ADVANCED: Anya, Viktor, Joshua M., Kimberly
ELIMINATED: Laura

=== Episode 13: The Finale, Part 1 ===
Original Airdate: October 20, 2011

The final four designers are critiqued on their collections and compete, for the last time, to show at Fashion Week. In a shock elimination, it is revealed that all of the four designers will be advancing to Fashion Week instead of the usual three.

- Judges: Heidi Klum, Nina Garcia, Michael Kors
- Guest Judge: None

ADVANCED TO FASHION WEEK: Joshua M., Viktor, Kimberly, Anya

=== Episode 14: The Finale, Part 2 ===
Original Airdate: October 27, 2011

The four finalists work the last part of preparation for Fashion Week, including model casting and hair and makeup counseling. Each shows their collection pieces before the winner of Project Runway Season 9 is announced.

- Judges: Heidi Klum, Nina Garcia, Michael Kors
- Guest Judge: L'Wren Scott

WINNER: Anya
ELIMINATED: Joshua M., Viktor, Kimberly

== Trivia ==
- Anya Ayoung-Chee won the Miss Trinidad and Tobago Universe in 2008 and represented her country in the Miss Universe pageant the same year but she failed to place in the Top 15 semifinalists.
