= Donald Keith Duncan =

Jamaican dental surgeon and politician (1940–2020)

Donald Keith Duncan CD

Minister of National Mobilization & Human Resource Development
- In office 1977–1980
- Monarch: Elizabeth II
- Governor General: Sir Florizel Glasspole
- Prime Minister: Michael Manley

Personal details
- Born: 1940 St. Ann, Colony of Jamaica
- Died: 17 September 2020 (aged 79–80) Kingston, Jamaica
- Party: People's National Party
- Spouse: Beverley Manley (née Anderson) (m. 2012)
- Children: Keith Duncan; Imani Duncan-Price; Patricia Duncan Sutherland; Donna Duncan-Scott

Donald Keith "D.K." Duncan, CD, (1940 – 17 September 2020) was a Jamaican dental surgeon and politician, representing the People's National Party (PNP). He served as Minister of National Mobilization & Human Resource Development (1977–1980).

== Early life and education ==
Duncan was born in 1940 in Brown's Town, St. Ann. He attended Jamaica College in the 1950s.

== Dental career ==
Duncan attended McGill University in Canada where he obtained a degree in dentistry in 1965. He operated private dental practices in Kingston and in Brown's Town.

== Political career ==
Duncan became National Organiser for the People's National Party in 1972 before being elevated to the position of General Secretary in June 1974, succeeding Kenneth Chin-Onn. He first ran for elected office in December 1976 when he won the general election from the St. Andrew East Central constituency, polling 9,301 votes to the JLP's Ashley Williams (4,209). He was appointed Minister of Mobilization in January 1977 and served in that post until 1980. Although the PNP lost the 1980 general election, Duncan was returned to Parliament from the constituency, but lost the seat when the PNP decided not to contest the 1983 election. After 1983, Duncan returned to his dental practice. He was briefly affiliated with the New Beginnings Movement political pressure group in the 1990s. In 1996, Duncan joined the Bruce Golding-led National Democratic Movement. He remained a member until his return to the PNP in 2007. Duncan contested the 2007 general election on behalf of the PNP and was elected from the Hanover Eastern constituency. He went on to serve two terms in Parliament. Duncan retired from representational politics in 2016.

Duncan served as a member of the former Electoral Advisory Committee (1981–1982) and subsequently as a member of the Electoral Commission of Jamaica (ECJ) from 2010 to 2014.

== Honors and awards ==
- In 2019, Duncan was conferred with the Order of Distinction, Commander class, for services to the Electoral Commission of Jamaica.

== Personal life and death ==
Duncan was first married to Joan Rennals, whom he met at McGill University in the 1960s. He then married Grace Verona Powe in December 1976. She died on 10 September 2010. Duncan then married Beverley Manley (née Anderson) on 21 January 2012. Duncan has 8 children: Keith Duncan, Donna Duncan-Scott, Patricia Duncan-Sutherland, Dawn Duncan, Imani Duncan-Price, Josina Duncan and David Duncan. Duncan tested positive for COVID-19 on 30 August 2020, during the COVID-19 pandemic in Jamaica and was admitted to hospital.

He died from complications of COVID-19 at the University Hospital of the West Indies, Kingston, Jamaica, on 17 September 2020, aged 80.
