= Wavinya =

Wavinya is a surname. Notable people with the surname include:

- Maria Wavinya (born 2000), Kenyan model and beauty queen
- Yvonne Wavinya (born 1996), Kenyan volleyball player
