= Miss British Virgin Islands =

Beauty pageant

The Miss British Virgin Islands Organization
- Formation: 1975; 51 years ago
- Type: Beauty pageant
- Headquarters: Road Town
- Location: British Virgin Islands
- Members: Miss Universe; Miss World; Miss International; Miss Earth
- Official language: English
- National director: Alesia Hamm (Affiliated to Ministry of Tourism, BVI)

The Miss British Virgin Islands is a national beauty pageant in British Virgin Islands. The pageant was founded in 1976, where the winners were sent to Miss Universe and Miss International.

== History ==
The Miss British Virgin Islands was held for the first time in 1975 by BVI Tourism, and Irene Penn-O’Neal won the first titleholder in that year. Before the pageant formed into the British Virgin Islands, the BVI Miss Festival contest existed in the territory. Since 1976 the British Virgin Islands licensed the Miss Universe pageant and became an official organization in the territory for Miss Universe under the Ministry of Tourism in the British Virgin Islands.

== International crowns ==
- One – Miss Caribbean World winner:
  - Sharie De Castro (2013)

== Titleholders ==
=== 1975—2020 ===
Winning International Title
Miss Universe British Virgin Islands
Miss World British Virgin Islands

Year	Miss British Virgin Islands
1975	Irene Penn-O’Neal
1976	Andria Dolores Norman
1979	Eartha Ferdinand
1980	Barbara Enola Stevens
1981	Carmen Nibbs
1982	Luce Dahlia Hodge
1983	Anna Maria Joseph
1984	Donna Patricia Frett
1985	Jennifer Leonora Penn
1986	Shereen Desmona Flax
1987	Sandy Michelle Harrigan
1988	Nelda Felecia Farrington
1989	Viola Marguerite Joseph
1990	Jestina Hodge
1991	Anne Lennard
1992	Alicia Burke
1993	Rhonda Hodge
1994	Delia Jon Baptiste
1995	Elaine Patricia Henry
1996	Linette Smith
1997	Melinda Penn
1998	Kaida Donovan
1999	Kamila Smith
2000	Tausha Vanterpool
2001	Shakima Stoutt
2002	Anastasia Tongue
2003	Dian Sanderson
2004	Sharlita Millington
2005	Kirsten Lettsome
2006	Shermel Maduro
2007	Leilani Stevens
2008	Maquita Richards; Did not compete
2009	Josefina Nunez
2010	Sheroma Hodge
2011	Abigail Hyndman
2012	Sharie De Castro; Miss Caribbean World 2013
2013	Rosanna Chichester
2014	Jaynene Jno Lewis
2015	Adorya Racio Baly
2016	Erika Creque
2017	Khephra Sylvester
2018	A’yana Keshelle Phillips
2019	Bria Ashley Smith
2020	Shabree Frett

=== 2021—Present ===
Began 2021 there are 3 main titles in the British Virgin Islands. The International representations will wear Miss Universe British Virgin Islands and Miss World British Virgin Islands, and the Miss British Virgin Islands title will be national ambassador of local tourism in the territory. Since 2024, the Miss British Virgin Islands title will compete at Miss International

Year	Miss British Virgin Islands	Miss World British Virgin Islands	Miss BVI (Ambassador of Tourism)
2021	Xaria Penn	Kathlyn Archibald-Drew; Did not compete	Kathlyn Archibald-Drew
2022	Lia Claxton	x	Jareena Penn
2023	Ashellica Fahie	Xaria Penn; Did not compete	Anika Christopher
Year	Miss British Virgin Islands	Miss World British Virgin Islands	Miss International British Virgin Islands
2024	Deyounce Lowenfield	x	Adacia Adonis; Did not compete
2025	Olivia Freeman	x	x

== Representatives to international beauty pageants ==
=== Miss Universe British Virgin Islands ===
- : Declared as Winner
- : Ended as runner-up or top 5/6 qualification
- : Ended as one of the finalists or semifinalists
- : Ended as special awards winner

The winner of Miss British Virgin Islands represents her country at the Miss Universe. On occasion, when the winner does not qualify (due to age) for either contest, a runner-up is sent.

Year	Miss BVI	Placement at Miss Universe	Special awards
2026	Orealia Thomas	TBA	
2025	Olivia Freeman	Unplaced	
2024	Deyounce Lowenfield	Unplaced	
2023	Ashellica Fahie	Unplaced	
2022	Lia Claxton	Unplaced	
2021	Xaria Penn	Unplaced	
2020	Shabree Frett	Unplaced	
2019	Bria Ashley Smith	Unplaced	
2018	A'yana Keshelle Phillips	Unplaced	
2017	Khephra Sylvester	Unplaced	
2016	Erika Renae Creque	Unplaced	Best National Costume (Top 12)
2015	Adorya Rocio Baly	Unplaced	
2014	Jaynene Jno Lewis	Unplaced	
2013	Sharie Bianca Ylina de Castro	Unplaced	
2012	Abigail Hyndman	Unplaced	Best National Costume (5th Runner-up)
2011	Sheroma Hodge	Unplaced	
2010	Josefina Nunez	Unplaced	
Did not compete between 2003—2009
2002	Anastasia Tonge	Unplaced	
2001	Kacy Frett	Unplaced	
2000	Tausha Vanterpool	Unplaced	
1999	Movel Lewis	Unplaced	
1998	Kaida Donovan	Unplaced	
1997	Melinda Penn	Unplaced	
1996	Linette Smith	Unplaced	
1995	Elaine Patricia Henry	Unplaced	
1994	Delia Jon Baptiste	Unplaced	
1993	Rhonda Hodge	Unplaced	
1992	Alicia Burke	Unplaced	
1991	Anne Lennard	Unplaced	
1990	Jestina Hodge	Unplaced	
1989	Viola Marguerite Joseph	Unplaced	
1988	Nelda Felecia Farrington	Unplaced	
1987	Sandy Michelle Harrigan	Unplaced	
1986	Shereen Desmona Flax	Unplaced	
1985	Jennifer Leonora Penn	Unplaced	
1984	Donna Patricia Frett	Unplaced	
1983	Anna Maria Joseph	Unplaced	
1982	Luce Dahlia Hodge	Unplaced	
1981	Carmen Nibbs	Unplaced	
1980	Barbara Enola Stevens	Unplaced	
1979	Eartha Ferdinand	Unplaced	
1978	Did not compete		
1977	Andria Dolores Norman	Unplaced	

=== Miss World British Virgin Islands ===
- : Declared as Winner
- : Ended as runner-up or top 5/6 qualification
- : Ended as one of the finalists or semifinalists
- : Ended as special awards winner

The 1st Runner-up of Miss British Virgin Islands crowned Miss British Virgin Islands World until 2017. Began 2018 an independent selection, Miss World BVI crowned the winner to Miss World pageant.

Year	Miss World BVI	Placement at Miss World	Special awards
2025	Xaria Penn	TBA	
2024	Miss World 2023 was rescheduled to 9 March 2024, no edition started in 2023		
2023	Xaria Penn	Did not compete	
2022	Miss World 2021 was rescheduled to 16 March 2022 due to the COVID-19 pandemic outbreak in Puerto Rico, no edition started in 2022		
2021	Kathlyn Archibald-Drew	Did not compete	
2020	Due to the impact of COVID-19 pandemic, no competition held		
2019	Rikkiya Brathwaite	Top 40	Miss World Sport; Miss World Talent (1st Runner-up)
2018	Yadali Thomas Santos	Unplaced	
2017	Helina Auriel Gerda Hilda Hewlett	Unplaced	Miss World Sport (2nd Runner-up) & Beauty With a Purpose (Top 20)
2016	Nakisha Kadia Turnbull	Unplaced	
2015	Sasha Wintz	Unplaced	
2014	Rosanna Kathrine Chichester	Unplaced	
2013	Kertis Kassandra Malone	Unplaced	Miss World Talent (3rd Runner-up)
Did not compete between 2002—2012
2001	Melinda McGlore	Unplaced	
2000	Nadia Harrigan Ubinas	Unplaced	
1999	Did not compete		
1998	Virginia Olen Rubaine	Unplaced	
1997	Zoe Jennifer Walcott	Unplaced	
1996	Ayana Glasgow	Unplaced	
1995	Chandi Trott	Unplaced	
1994	Khara Michelle Forbes	Unplaced	
1993	Kaida Donovan	Unplaced	
1992	Bisa Smith	Unplaced	
1991	Marjorie Penn	Unplaced	
1990	Suzanne Spencer	Unplaced	
1989	Did not compete		
1988	Nelda Felecia Farrington	Unplaced	
1987	Did not compete		
1986	Anthonia Brenda Lewis	Unplaced	

=== Miss Earth British Virgin Islands ===
- : Declared as Winner
- : Ended as runner-up or top 5/6 qualification
- : Ended as one of the finalists or semifinalists
- : Ended as special awards winner

Year	Miss Earth BVI	Placement at Miss Earth	Special awards
Did not compete since 2017—Present
2017	Dayna Layne	Did not compete	
Did not compete between 2014—2016
2013	Kimberly Herbert	Unplaced	

=== Miss International British Virgin Islands ===
- : Declared as Winner
- : Ended as runner-up or top 5/6 qualification
- : Ended as one of the finalists or semifinalists
- : Ended as special awards winner

Year	Miss International BVI	Placement at Miss International	Special awards
2024	Adacia Adonis	Did not compete	
