= La Toya Woods =

Trinidadian actress, model, and beauty pageant titleholder

- Born: La Toya Woods; 25 September 1985 (age 41); Couva, Trinidad and Tobago
- Height: 1.78 m (5 ft 10 in)
- Beauty pageant titleholder
- Title: Miss Universe Trinidad and Tobago 2010
- Hair color: Black
- Eye color: Brown
- Major competitions: Miss Universe Trinidad and Tobago 2010 (winner); Miss Universe 2010 (unplaced)

La Toya Woods (born 1985) is a Trinidadian actress, model and beauty pageant titleholder who winner of the Miss Trinidad and Tobago Universe 2010 and represented her country at Miss Universe 2010 in Las Vegas, United States. She competed in the local pageant as Miss Point Lisas.

Woods was at the time of the Miss Universe contest a Psychology student at the College of Science, Technology and Applied Arts of Trinidad & Tobago (COSTAATT). She is also a fashion model, her work including modelling during Trinidad and Tobago Fashion Week, for local fashion shows, and Caribbean Belle magazine.

In 2011 she was a judge at the Red Bull Flugtag at William's Bay, Chaguaramas.

Preceded by Anya Ayoung Chee	Miss Trinidad & Tobago Universe; 2010	Succeeded by Gabrielle Walcott
