= Miss Jamaica World =

Beauty contest

- Formation: 1959
- Type: Beauty pageant
- Headquarters: Kingston
- Location: Jamaica
- Members: Miss World
- Official language: English
- Franchise Holder: Crown of Beauty Jamaica
- Key people: Weston Haughton, Dahlia Harris
- Website: Official website

Miss Jamaica World is a national beauty pageant in Jamaica that selects a contestant to represent the country in the Miss World beauty pageant.

== History ==
The Miss Jamaica World pageant's predecessor, the "Miss Jamaica Contest", began on June 7 1959. The winner of Miss Jamaica represents Jamaica at the Miss World pageant from 1959 to present. The title of Miss Jamaica World was officially coined in 1978. The 1976 and 1977 representatives were appointed by then licence holder Mickey Haughton-James of the Spartan Health Club. Spartan held the franchise from 1976 to 2012 and resumed its leadership in 2017.

In 2018, Miss World Organization announced that the franchise to stage the Miss Jamaica World pageant as a precursor to Miss World has been granted to Crown of Beauty Jamaica Limited, whose principals are local playwright and impresario Aston Cooke and veteran entertainment specialist Weston Haughton.

Jamaica sent its first representative, w4 year old Sheila Chong in 1959. To date Jamaica has garnered four Miss World titles (1963, 1976, 1993, and 2019) and several runner ups and top ten finalists.

== Titleholders ==
Color key

- Declared as Winner
- Ended as runner-up
- Ended as one of the finalists or semifinalists

The winner of Miss Jamaica World represents her country at Miss World. On occasion, when the winner does not qualify (due to age) for either contest, a runner-up is sent.

Year	Miss Jamaica	Placement	Special Awards
1959	Sheila Mechtilde Chong	Top 15	
1962	Chriss Leon	Top 15	
1963	Carole Crawford	Miss World 1963	
1964	Erica Jeanne Cooke	5th Runner-up	
1965	Carol Joan McFarlane	Unplaced	
1966	Yvonne Walter	Unplaced	
1967	Laurel Williams	Unplaced	
1968	Karlene Waddel	Unplaced	
1969	Marlyn E. Taylor	Top 15	
1970	Elizabeth Ann Lindo	Unplaced	
1971	Ava Joy Gill	4th Runner-up	
1972	Gail Geraldeen Phillips	Unplaced	
1973	Patsy Yuen	2nd Runner-up	
1974	Andrea Lyon	Top 15	
1976	Cindy Breakspeare	Miss World 1976	
1977	Sandra Kong	Withdrew	
1978	Joan McDonald	Unplaced	
1979	Debbie Campbell	2nd Runner-up	
1980	Michelle Harris	Top 15	
1981	Sandra Cunningham	2nd Runner-up	
1982	Cornelia Parchment	Unplaced	
1983	Cathi Levy	3rd Runner-up	
1984	Jacqueline Crichton	Unplaced	
1985	Alison Barnett	4th Runner-up	
1986	Lisa Mahfood	Unplaced	
1987	Janice Whittingham	Unplaced	
1988	Andrea Haynes	Unplaced	
1989	Natasha Marcanik	Unplaced	
1990	Erica Aquart	Top 10	Caribbean Queen of Beauty
1991	Sandra Foster	3rd Runner-up	Caribbean Queen of Beauty
1992	Julie Ann Bradford	Unplaced	
1993	Lisa Hanna	Miss World 1993	Caribbean Queen of Beauty
1994	Johanna Ulett	Unplaced	
1995	Imani Duncan	Unplaced	
1996	Selena Delgado	Unplaced	
1997	Michell Moodie	Unplaced	Caribbean Queen of Beauty
1998	Christine Straw	Top 10	Caribbean Queen of Beauty
1999	Desiree DePass	Unplaced	Caribbean Queen of Beauty
2000	Ayisha Richards	Unplaced	
2001	Regina Beavers	Unplaced	
2002	Danielle O'Hayon	Unplaced	
2003	Jade Fulford	Top 17	Caribbean Queen of Beauty; Beach Beauty (Top 10)
2004	Tonoya Toyloy	Unplaced	Miss Scholarship
2005	Terri-Karelle Griffith	Top 16	Beach Beauty (Top 19)
2006	Sara Lawrence	3rd Runner-up	Caribbean Queen of Beauty; Beach Beauty (Top 25)
2007	Yendi Phillipps	Top 16	Beach Beauty (1st Runner-up); Beauty with a Purpose (Top 5); Top Model (Top 7); Sports and Fitness (Top 16); Performing Talent (Top 18)
2008	Brittany Lyons	Unplaced	Performing Talent (Top 19)
2009	Kerrie Baylis	Unplaced	Sports and Fitness (1st Runner-up); Best World Designer Dress Award (2nd Runner-up); Top Model (Top 12); Beach Beauty (Top 20)
2010	Chantal Raymond	Unplaced	
2011	Danielle Crosskill	Unplaced	Sports and Fitness (Top 24)
2012	Deanna Robins	5th Runner-up	Caribbean Queen of Beauty; Performing Talent (Top 5); Beauty with a Purpose (Top 10); Top Model (Top 10); Sports and Fitness (Top 24); Beach Beauty (Top 40)
2013	Gina Hargitay	Top 10	Caribbean Queen of Beauty; Beach Beauty (3rd Runner-up); Best in Interview (1st Place)
2014	Laurie-Ann Chin	Unplaced	Sports and Fitness (Top 29)
2015	Sanneta Myrie	3rd Runner-up	Caribbean Queen of Beauty; Performing Talent (2nd Runner-up); Best in Interview (4th Runner-up); Multimedia Award (Top 5)
2016	Ashlie Barrett	Unplaced	
2017	Solange Sinclair	Top 10	Caribbean Queen of Beauty; Sports and Fitness (Top 23)
2018	Kadijah Robinson	Top 5	Caribbean Queen of Beauty; Beauty with a Purpose (Top 12)
2019	Toni-Ann Singh	Miss World 2019	Miss World Talent
2020	Due to the impact of COVID-19 pandemic, no pageant in 2020		
2021	Khalia Hall	Unplaced	Miss World Talent (Top 27); Miss World Sport (Top 32)
2022	Due to the impact of COVID-19 pandemic, no pageant in 2022		
2023	Shanique Singh	Unplaced	
2024	No competition held		
2025	Tahje Bennett	Top 40	Miss World Talent (Top 24)
2026	Nevaeh Allen	Unplaced	
2027	Matea Mahal Smith	TBA	

== Trivia ==
Miss Jamaica 1963 is the shortest woman in history to win Miss World. She is 5 feet 3 inches (1.60 m) tall.

Cindy Breakspeare is the mother of Damian Marley, son of reggae icon Bob Marley.

Joan McDonald was the first to hold the official title of Miss Jamaica World. She is also the first winner of full African descent. Her win came at a time when public pressure built up for winners who represented the dominant ethnic group in Jamaica.

Lisa Hanna is currently a Member of Parliament and former Minister of Youth and Culture.

Miss Jamaica World 1991, Sandra Foster, represented Jamaica at Miss Universe 1989 and made Top Ten.

Miss Jamaica World 1989, Janice Sewell, is currently working in Human Resources.

Miss Jamaica World 1995, Imani Duncan, currently serves as a Senator.

Regina Beavers became the youngest title holder, she won at age 17 in 2001.

Miss Jamaica World 1998, Christine Straw, later represented Jamaica in Miss Universe 2004, making the Top Ten.

Miss Jamaica World 2005, Terri-Karelle Griffith-Reid, is a successful keynote speaker, events and TV host. She is the host of the popular talent show Digicel Rising Stars, which was previously hosted by Yendi Phillipps from 2008 to 2009.

Miss Jamaica World 2006 was subject to controversy when she got pregnant during her reign. Miss World CEO Julia Morley allowed her to retain her title as Miss World Caribbean.

Miss Jamaica World 2007, Yendi Phillipps, went on to win Miss Jamaica Universe in 2010 and placed first runner-up at Miss Universe 2010.

Miss Jamaica World 2009, Kerrie Baylis later represented Jamaica at Miss Universe 2013 but was unplaced.

Miss Jamaica World 2017 and Miss World Caribbean 2017 Solange Sinclair is the granddaughter of deceased Hollywood actress Madge Sinclair who had notable roles as Queen Aoleon in Coming to America and the voice of Sarabi in Disney's The Lion King.
