= Keith Duncan (politician) =

Jamaican politician

Senator The Honourable Keith Duncan OJ, CD

Member of the Jamaican Senate
- Incumbent
- Assumed office September 2025

Personal details
- Born: June 29, 1970 (age 56)
- Party: People’s National Party
- Parent: Donald Keith Duncan
- Education: University of Western Ontario (BA)

Keith Patrice Duncan OJ, CD, is a Jamaican politician who currently serves as a member of the Jamaican Senate since September 2025. He is the son of former government minister Donald Keith Duncan.

== Biography ==
- He is the chief executive officer of JMMB since 2005.
- President of the Private Sector Organisation of Jamaica (PSOJ) (2019 – 2022)
- Commander of the Order of Distinction (2020)
- Order of Jamaica (OJ) – (2025)

Duncan is married to Wendy Duncan. The couple had four children.
