= Maria LaYacona =

American photographer

Maria LaYacona (1926–2019) was an American-born photographer who worked primarily in Jamaica. For its first three decades, she was the official photographer for the country's National Dance Theatre Company.

== Early life ==
LaYacona's parents emigrated from Italy to America and she was born in Cleveland, Ohio, on 18 November 1926. Her father ran a portrait studio from the family home and she and her brother both assisted him in his darkroom. She studied at the Winona School of Professional Photography in Winona Lake, Indiana, before moving to New York City in 1950 where she supported herself by taking photographs for publicity shots and society weddings.

She worked as a photojournalist for Time and Life and, in 1955 accepted an assignment from Sports Illustrated, traveling to Jamaica to shoot the test series between Australia and the West Indies at Sabina Park. She was entranced by the country and returned the same year and spent the rest of her life in Jamaica.

== Career in Jamaica ==
To support herself, she accepted jobs for advertisements and tourism promotion and introduced school photography packages to the country, but her passion was portraiture. Her portrait of Prime Minister Michael Manley appears on the $1,000 banknote. She photographed artists and politicians, as well as everyday Jamaicans—fisherman at work, and children playing.

In 1964, two years after its founding, she joined the National Dance Theatre Company as official photographer, a position she retained until her retirement in 1992. Her photographs of the dancers were published in two books, Roots and Rhythms (1969) and Dance Jamaica: Renewal and Continuity (1985). Several of her dance photographs were also featured on Jamaican postage stamps.

She was founder of the Colour Photography Club, which was to become the Jamaica Photography Society.

By 2000 LaYacona had retired to a townhouse in Kingston. She died on 28 April 2019.

== Publications ==
- Roots and Rhythms (1969)
- Dance Jamaica: Renewal and Continuity (1985)
- Jamaica Portraits (1998)
- Jamaica Reverie (2006)
