= Chantal Raymond =

Jamaican model and beauty pageant titleholder

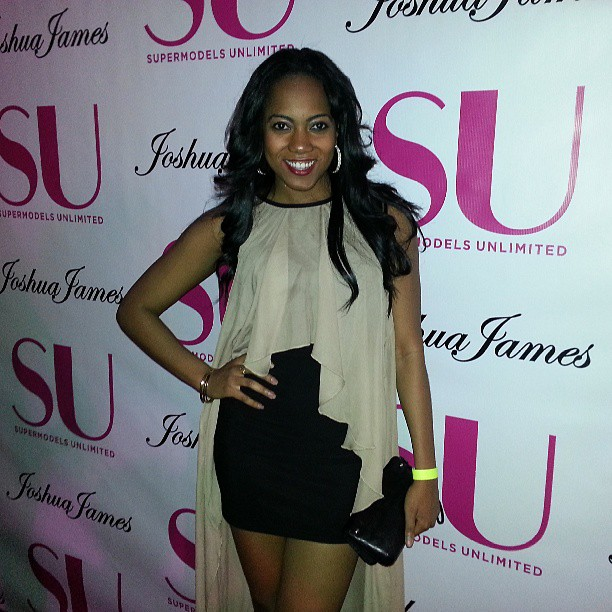
- Born: Chantal Alicia Raymond; November 10, 1985 (age 40); Kingston, Jamaica
- Education: Harvard Law School (J.D.); University of Florida (B.S.)
- Height: 5 ft 9 in (1.75 m)
- Beauty pageant titleholder
- Title: Miss Jamaica World 2010 Miss Teen Miramar 2004
- Hair color: Brown
- Eye color: Brown
- Major competitions: Miss Jamaica World 2010 (Winner); Miss World 2010

Chantal Alicia Raymond (born November 10, 1985) is a Jamaican model and beauty pageant titleholder who was the winner of the Miss Jamaica World 2010 beauty pageant. She represented Jamaica at the Miss World 2010 contest held in Sanya, China, on October 30, 2010. After Miss Jamaica World, Raymond appeared in commercials for brands such as Lincoln Motor Company and AT&T. She also appeared in a 2017 episode of House Hunters International.

== Education ==
Raymond currently holds a Bachelor of Science Degree from the University of Florida College of Journalism and Communications and a Juris Doctor from Harvard Law School. While a student at Harvard, Raymond completed an international Political and Economic Internship with the U.S. Department of State.

One of Raymond's most notable achievements was obtaining nine undergraduate academic scholarships to complete her degree. She was also the youngest student in her high school graduating class, allowing her to begin full-time study at the University of Florida at only 16 years old.

== Career ==
Raymond is presently CEO & Founder of Inclusive Legal Search. Inclusive Legal Search is a national legal recruiting firm with an emphasis on diversity recruiting.

Raymond has been featured in Bloomberg Law, Business Insider, The ABA Journal, Law360, Law.com and Above The Law, as well as other local and international publications. She is a 40 Under 40 National Bar Association honoree and was featured on the 2021 Forbes Next 1000 list of inspiring entrepreneurs and small business leaders.

Awards and achievements
Preceded by Kerrie Baylis	Miss Jamaica World; 2010	Succeeded by Danielle Crosskill
