= Beverley Manley =

Jamaican public figure (born 1941)

The Most Honourable Beverley Manley
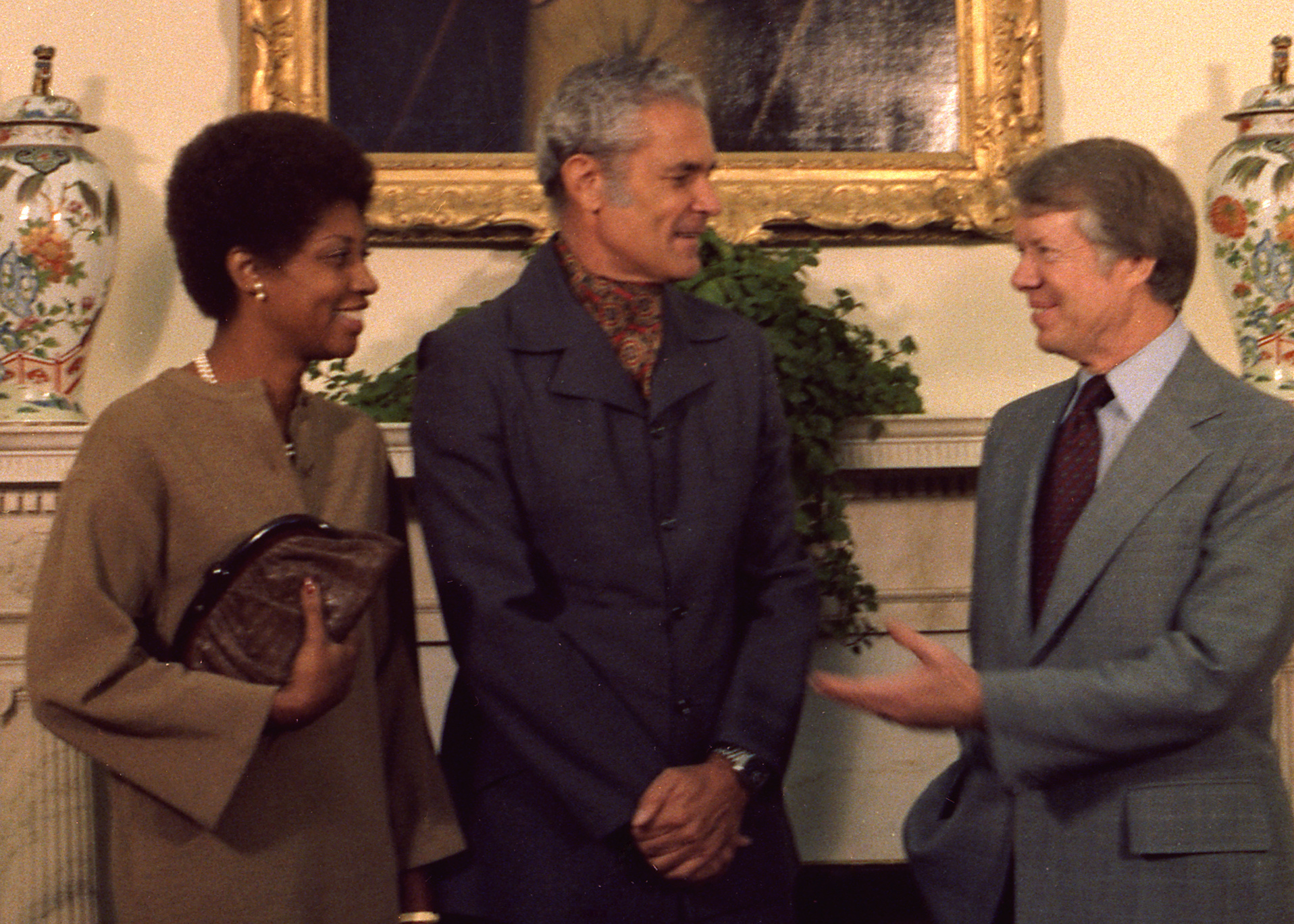
- Beverley Manley and Michael Manley with US president Jimmy Carter in 1977
- Born: Beverley Lois Anderson; 8 November 1941 (age 85); Jamaica
- Education: University of the West Indies, Mona; Howard University
- Occupations: Broadcaster, women's rights advocate
- Notable work: The Manley Memoirs (2008)
- Spouses: Michael Manley (m. 1972; div. 1993) Donald Keith Duncan (m. 2012; died 2020)
- Children: 2

Beverley Lois Anderson-Manley (born 8 November 1941) is a Jamaican public figure who was the First Lady of Jamaica between 1972 and 1980. In the 1970s, she emerged as a leader in women's rights advocacy, leading a campaign for a maternity leave. From 1972 to 1993, she was married to Michael Manley, who was Prime Minister of Jamaica from 1972 to 1980. Manley was known for being more radical than her husband and helping him connect with Jamaica's black population. She was a popular figure among the majority of Jamaicans. Manley also co-founded a radio show, The Breakfast Club, with Eric Anthony Abrahams in 1992. After divorcing Michael, she published The Manley Memoirs in 2008, and in 2012 she married Donald Keith Duncan.

== Early life ==
Beverley Lois Anderson was born on 8 November 1941, to Esmine Anderson née Pearson and Eric Anderson, and she grew up in "meager" surroundings in a working-class family. She had African and distant Scottish/English ancestry. Her father was a clerk for the Jamaica Railway Corporation. Manley started her career as a model and a public broadcaster, becoming a popular figure known for favoring Jamaican music over music from other countries. In the 1970s, she attended the University of the West Indies, Mona.

== Marriage to Michael Manley ==
She married Michael Manley in 1972, and they had two children: the first in 1974 and the second in 1980. Michael Manley was 17 years older than her, and she was his fourth wife. He became Prime Minister of Jamaica in 1972, holding the role for eight years. Manley was First Lady of Jamaica for the duration of his term, advocating on behalf of women and children. She was also president of the PNP's women's movement in at least 1979, advocating for maternity leave, and a leader of the movement throughout the 1970s. A law that granted maternity leave was signed in 1979. Biographer Michael Darrell E. Levi wrote in 1989 that Beverley Manley "played a major role in sensitizing her husband to women's concerns". In 1974, she spoke to UNESCO about women's rights. She also visited Moscow and Cuba and was a vocal anti-imperialist, for which she was attacked by The Gleaner newspaper. She was more politically radical than her husband.

Manley also worked to help her husband "connect" with Jamaica's black population—while his skin was light, she had dark skin, an Afro reminiscent of the Black Power movement, and often wore "African attire" such as a dashiki—and developed a reputation for being involved with gender-related issues. She later said she helped Michael with his public speaking. Manley was not universally accepted by wealthier and more powerful Jamaicans; for instance, some told her to straighten her hair. However, she was widely supported and admired by the general populace. Manley was Jamaica's patron of International Women's Year in 1975 and attended the International Women's Year Conference that year. She sought to establish forms of day care and education for infants. In 1975, Manley was fired upon while she and her husband led a funeral procession for the politician Winston Blake.

Manley has also represented Jamaica in the United Nations Commission on the Status of Women.

== Later life ==
She attended Howard University from 1985 to 1986, working towards a Doctor of Philosophy. Their marriage fell apart after both she and her husband were unfaithful. They divorced in 1993. The year before, Manley and Eric Anthony Abrahams had created a radio show that focused on current events, The Breakfast Club.

She entered into a relationship with Donald Keith Duncan, who had been a minister in her husband's cabinet. In 2008, she published The Manley Memoirs, an autobiography of her childhood and marriage. In a review of the work, Christopher Porter for The Washington Post wrote: "In some ways, Beverley was to Prime Minister Michael Manley what Hillary Clinton was to Bill Clinton — with everything that implies: a strong, smart woman married to a brilliant but human leader, whose philandering caused pain in the marriage ... (And she had her own dalliances, too.)" On 21 January 2012, Manley and Duncan were married after a 32-year affair. The two were together until Duncan's death in 2020. Manley is the subject of and appeared in a four-part film documentary titled Beverley Manley Uncensored in July 2022.

== Bibliography ==
- Bedasse, Monique (2017). Jah kingdom: Rastafarians, Tanzania, and pan-Africanism in the age of decolonization. Chapel Hill: University of North Carolina Press. ISBN 978-1-4696-3360-2. OCLC 1000520466.
- Libro de oro. Interamerican Commission of Women. 1980. ISBN 978-0-8270-1066-6.
- Levi, Darrell E. (1989). Michael Manley: the making of a leader. Kingston, Jamaica: Heinemann Publishers (Caribbean). ISBN 978-976-605-088-7.
