= Imani Duncan-Price =

Former Miss Jamaica World and politician

The Honorable Imani Duncan-Price

Government Senator
- In office January 2012 – February 2016

Personal details
- Born: July 17, 1976 (age 50) Kingston, Jamaica
- Citizenship: Jamaica
- Party: People's National Party
- Parent: DK Duncan
- Education: University Of The West Indies, Wesleyan College, Harvard University Kennedy School Of Government
- Alma mater: Campion College
- Occupation: Politician, Business Executive, Philanthropist

Grace Imani Duncan-Price (born July 17, 1976) is a former senator of Jamaica, who sat on the government benches under the People's National Party. A former beauty queen, Imani was crowned Miss Jamaica World 1995, and represented Jamaica at the 1995 Miss World Pageant, in Sun City, South Africa.
