= Anya Ayoung-Chee =

American fashion designer

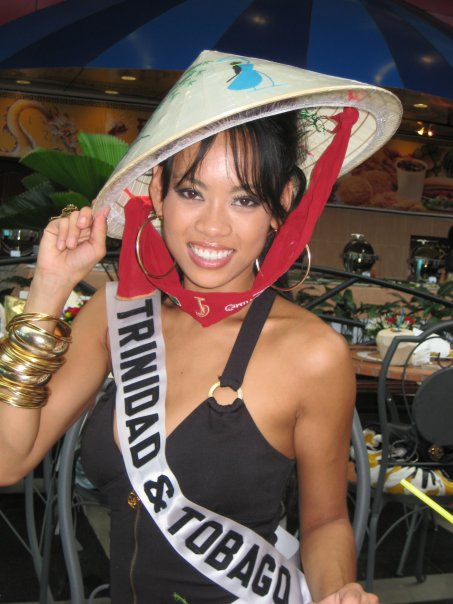
- Anya at the Miss Universe 2008 Pageant
- Born: Anya Ayoung-Chee; New York, United States
- Height: 1.70 m (5 ft 7 in)
- Beauty pageant titleholder
- Title: Miss Universe Trinidad and Tobago 2008
- Hair color: Black
- Eye color: Brown
- Major competitions: Miss Universe Trinidad & Tobago 2008 (winner); Miss Universe 2008; Project Runway season 9

Anya Ayoung-Chee is a Trinidadian host, fashion designer, model and beauty pageant titleholder. She was Miss Universe Trinidad and Tobago 2008 and was a contestant in the Miss Universe 2008 pageant. She was the winner of Project Runway's ninth season in 2011. She founded the fashion lines Anya de Rouge and Pilar and the online fashion retailer cANYAval.

== Early life ==
Anya Ayoung-Chee was born to Trinidadian parents in New York City but moved to Trinidad at the age of two; she therefore holds dual Trinidadian and American citizenship. She is the only daughter in a family of eight. From an early age she pursued classical ballet training. During her attendance at an all-girls secondary school, St. Joseph's Convent, Port of Spain, she became passionate about art and design. She continued her education in London and New York, studying graphic and interior design at Parsons School of Design and Central Saint Martins School of Art and Design. She remained in New York until 2007, when her brother Pilar died. She then returned home to Trinidad.

== Miss Universe Trinidad & Tobago ==
Following her return to Trinidad, Ayoung-Chee entered the 2008 Miss Universe competition and won the title of Miss Universe Trinidad & Tobago. She is the second Miss Universe Trinidad & Tobago in the franchise's 44-year history to be of Chinese descent. When asked, "Is your Asian heritage an issue since you represent a country with an overwhelming African and Indian heritage?" Ayoung-Chee replied, "Trinidad & Tobago is unique in its ethnic make-up because it is a country with people of all races. I am of mixed origin, mainly Chinese, Indian and Caucasian, and although my particular mixture is a minority, I represent the unusual combination of ethnicities that defines us as a people."

Following her success as Miss Universe Trinidad & Tobago, Ayoung-Chee went on to host a number of Caribbean television and web-based shows, including her own fashion show, Make It Yours.

Ayoung-Chee had been involved in philanthropy since 2003, when she became a member of the TallMan Foundation. The foundation was established by her family for the empowerment of young people in underprivileged areas. Following her Miss Trinidad & Tobago title, she became more involved in charitable work. In 2008 the United Nations Association of Trinidad & Tobago (UNATT) asked Ayoung-Chee and Gabrielle Walcott to be spokeswomen and champions for the group. They both served during their reigns as Miss T&T, and continue as members of UNATT, the NGO arm of the United Nations which aims to advocate for the United Nations and the Millennium Development Goals.

== Fashion designer ==
During the Miss Universe pageant, Ayoung-Chee brought her design training and experience to her own wardrobe, most of which she designed and styled, and she decided to become a fashion designer as a result. She auditioned for and was accepted as a contestant on Season 9 of the American television show Project Runway in 2011.

Ayoung-Chee had experience creating designs, but her tailoring had been done by others. Despite learning to sew only four months before auditioning for the program, she placed in the top three of most of the challenges, and eventually won the competition on October 27, 2011. Ayoung-Chee earned $100,000 from L'Oreal Paris to begin her own women's line, Pilar—named after her deceased brother. She also was featured in a fashion spread in Marie Claire and received a $50,000 technology suite by HP and Intel with which to design and sell merchandise, as well as a partnership with Piperlime.com. She was also voted the fan favorite in a Twitter contest, for which she received another $10,000.

Ayoung-Chee continued to design for Pilar and also founded a lingerie line, Anya de Rouge. In 2014 she appeared on reality show Under the Gunn, working with Tim Gunn to mentor other designers.

She has hosted events and produced fashion for Trinidad's carnival, and has founded online store cANYAval, where she works with other designers creating clothing inspired by Trinidad's carnival. The store focuses on Monday Wear, or elaborate bathing suits worn on the day before carnival Tuesday. She is also a travel ambassador for Trinidad and Tobago.

In 2019, Ayoung-Chee competed in Season 7 of Project Runway All Stars, that featured a cast of previous winners. She placed 10th overall.

== Personal life ==
Ayoung-Chee met her longtime boyfriend Wyatt Gallery in 2006 at Trinidad carnival. Following the theft and release of their private sex tape in 2009, they ceased to appear in public together for some time, but continued dating. The two became engaged in 2015. The couple married in January 2018, and their son Kaïri Pilar Gallery was born on July 3, 2018. In September 2021, their daughter Aya Charlotte Gallery was born.

Preceded by Gretchen Jones	Project Runway winner Anya Ayoung-Chee	Succeeded by Dmitry Sholokhov

Preceded by Kenisha Thom	Miss Trinidad & Tobago Universe; 2008	Succeeded by La Toya Woods
