= Abigail Hyndman =

Virgin Islander beauty pageant titleholder (born 1990)

- Born: Abigail Hyndman; 1990 (age 35–36)
- Beauty pageant titleholder
- Title: Miss British Virgin Islands 2011
- Hair color: Brown
- Major competitions: Miss Universe 2012 (Unplaced)

Abigail Hyndman (born 1990) is a Virgin Islander beauty pageant titleholder. Crowned Miss British Virgin Islands 2011, she also represented the British overseas territory in the 2012 Miss Universe pageant.

== Early life ==
Born in 1990, she was a student of biology at Xavier University in Louisiana in 2012, where she considered becoming a nun as well.

== Pageant career ==
She was among 89 contestants vying for Miss Universe 2012.

Abigail Hyndman was chosen as Miss British Virgin Islands 2011 during the final event held at the Multi Purpose Sports Complex on 31 July 2011 in Road Town.

Hyndman represented the British Virgin Islands in Miss Universe 2012.

Awards and achievements
Preceded by Sheroma Hodge	Miss British Virgin Islands; 2011	Succeeded by Sharie De Castro
