= Miss World 2019 =

69th edition of beauty pageant

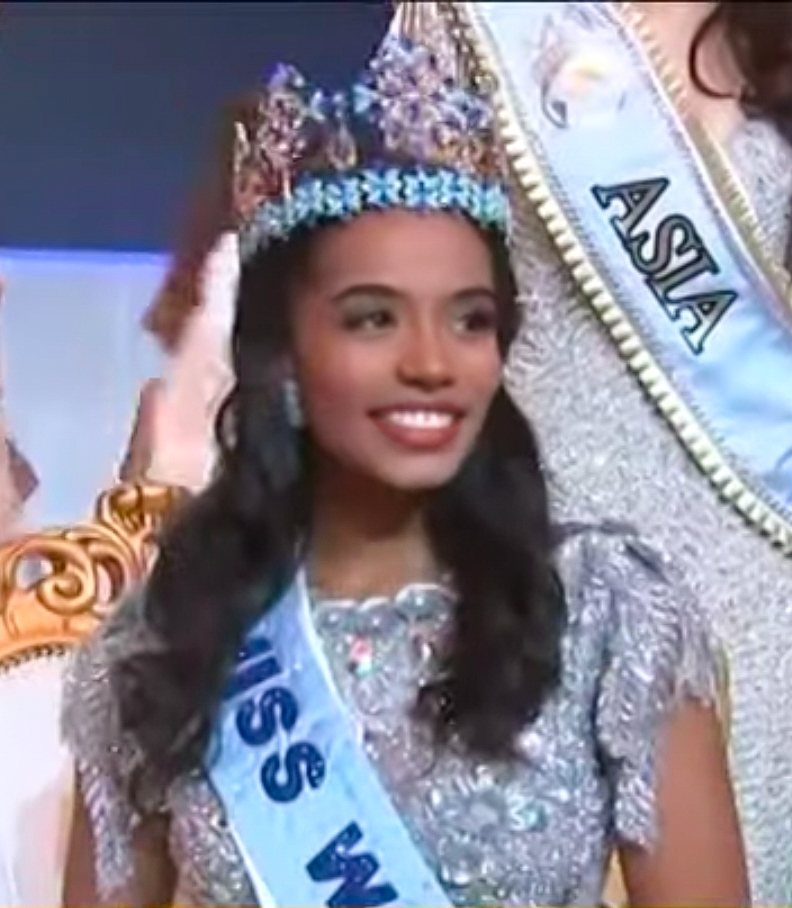
- Toni-Ann Singh
- Date: 14 December 2019
- Presenters: Megan Young; Peter Andre; Fernando Allende; Stephanie Del Valle
- Entertainment: Peter Andre; Lulu; Misunderstood; Kerry Ellis
- Venue: ExCeL London, London, United Kingdom
- Broadcaster: E!; London Live; Univision
- Entrants: 111
- Placements: 40
- Withdrawals: Austria; Belize; Cameroon; Cyprus; Egypt; Germany; Guam; Latvia; Lebanon; Lesotho; Madagascar; Martinique; Norway; Serbia; Zambia; Zimbabwe
- Returns: Antigua and Barbuda; Cambodia; Costa Rica; Kyrgyzstan; Macau; Samoa; Sweden; Tunisia; United States Virgin Islands
- Winner: Toni-Ann Singh; Jamaica

Miss World 2019 was the 69th edition of the Miss World pageant, held at the Exhibition Centre London in London, England, on 14 December 2019.

At the end of the event, Vanessa Ponce of Mexico crowned Toni-Ann Singh of Jamaica as Miss World 2019. It is the fourth victory of Jamaica in the history of the pageant.

Contestants from 111 countries and territories competed in the pageant. The pageant was hosted by Peter Andre, Miss World 2013 Megan Young, Miss World 2016 Stephanie Del Valle, and Fernando Allende. Peter Andre, Lulu, Misunderstood, and Kerry Ellis performed in this edition.

== Background ==
=== Location and date ===
The official announcement was made on 19 February 2019, in Bangkok, by Miss World President Julia Morley, CEO Tanawat Wansom of TW Pageants, and guest Ashwani Kumar Rai. They announced a mid-December date for the contest.

However, on 2 July 2019, Morley and Vanessa Ponce, the reigning Miss World, appeared on ITV's Good Morning Britain with Piers Morgan. Morley officially announced that the pageant will be held on Saturday, 14 December 2019, at ExCeL London and that Miss World 2020 will be held in Thailand in order to celebrate Miss World's 70th anniversary. The 2019 opening ceremony was held in London on 20 November. Contestants then competed in a series of fast track events around London.

=== Selection of participants ===
Contestants from 111 countries and territories were selected to compete in the competition. Three of these delegates were appointees to their national titles and another was selected to replace the original winner.

==== Returns and withdrawals ====
This edition saw the returns of Cambodia who last competed in 2006, Samoa in 2015, Antigua and Barbuda, Costa Rica, Kyrgyzstan, and the United States Virgin Islands in 2016, and Macau, Sweden, and Tunisia who last competed in 2017.

Larissa Robitschko of Austria did not compete in any international pageant after their national organization relinquished the local franchise. Palesa Makara of Lesotho and Sanja Lovčević of Serbia withdrew due to undisclosed reasons. Valerie Mille Binguira of Madagascar withdrew due to internal conflicts with their national organization. Belize, Cameroon, Cyprus, Egypt, Germany, Guam, Latvia, Lebanon, Martinique, Norway, Zambia, and Zimbabwe withdrew after their respective organizations failed to hold a national competition or appoint a delegate.

== Results ==
=== Placements ===
Placement	Contestant
Miss World 2019	Jamaica – Toni-Ann Singh
1st runner-up	France – Ophély Mézino
2nd runner-up	India – Suman Rao
Top 5	Brazil – Elis Miele; Nigeria – Nyekachi Douglas
Top 12	Cook Islands – Tajiya Eikura Sahay; Kenya – Maria Wavinya; Mexico – Ashley Alvídrez; Nepal – Anushka Shrestha; Philippines – Michelle Dee; Russia – Alina Sanko; Vietnam – Lương Thùy Linh
Top 40	Antigua and Barbuda – Taqiyyah Francis; Australia – Sarah Marschke; British Virgin Islands – Rikkiya Brathwaite; China – Li Peishan; Denmark – Natasja Kunde; England – Bhasha Mukherjee; Guyana – Joylyn Conway; Hong Kong – Lila Lam; Indonesia – Princess Megonondo; Malaysia – Alexis SueAnn Seow; Moldova – Elizaveta Kuznetsova; Mongolia – Tsevelmaa Mandakh; New Zealand – Lucy Brock; Paraguay – Araceli Bobadilla; Poland – Milena Sadowska; Portugal – Inês Brusselmans; Puerto Rico – Daniella Rodríguez; Scotland – Keryn Matthew; South Africa – Sasha-Lee Olivier; Spain – María del Mar Aguilera; Thailand – Narintorn Chadapattarawalrachoat; Trinidad and Tobago – Tya Jané Ramey; Tunisia – Sabrine Mansour; Uganda – Oliver Nakakande; Ukraine – Marharyta Pasha; United States – Emmy Cuvelier; Venezuela – Isabella Rodríguez; Wales – Gabriella Jukes

=== Continental Queens of Beauty ===
Continent	Contestant
Africa	Nigeria – Nyekachi Douglas
Americas	Brazil – Elís Miele Coelho
Asia	India – Suman Rao
Caribbean	Trinidad and Tobago – Tya Jané Ramey
Europe	France – Ophély Mézino
Oceania	Cook Islands – Tajiya Eikura Sahay

== Challenge events ==
=== Head-to-Head Challenge ===
==== Round 1 ====
- Advanced to Round 2 of the Head-to-Head Challenge.
- Advanced to Round 2 of the Head-to-Head Challenge, but advanced to the Top 40 via judges' choice or a challenge event other than Head-to-Head Challenge.
- Advanced to the Top 40 via a challenge event other than Head-to-Head Challenge.
- Advanced to the Top 40 via judges' choice.

Group	Country 1	Country 2	Country 3	Country 4	Country 5	Country 6
1	Albania	England	Guyana	Honduras	South Korea	Peru
2	Cook Islands	Guatemala	Ireland	Italy	Myanmar	Russia
3	British Virgin Islands	Iceland	Laos	Nicaragua	South Sudan	Venezuela
4	Armenia	Bolivia	Bulgaria	Kazakhstan	Mongolia	South Africa
5	Guadeloupe	Hong Kong	Moldova	Singapore	Spain	Sri Lanka
6	Brazil	Curaçao	Denmark	Ecuador	Malta	Northern Ireland
7	Equatorial Guinea	Hungary	Malaysia	Trinidad and Tobago	United States	Wales
8	Chile	Croatia	France	New Zealand	Paraguay	Scotland
9	Canada	Czech Republic	Indonesia	Portugal	Sierra Leone	Tunisia
10	Cayman Islands	Gibraltar	Mexico	Nepal	Poland	Tanzania
11	Colombia	Costa Rica	Japan	Luxembourg	Netherlands	Nigeria
12	Belgium	Jamaica	Panama	Slovenia	Turkey	United States Virgin Islands
13	Australia	El Salvador	Georgia	Guinea-Bissau	Puerto Rico	Slovakia
14	Bahamas	Bosnia and Herzegovina	Botswana	Haiti	India	Thailand
15	Antigua and Barbuda	Barbados	China	Greece	Samoa	Sweden
16	Argentina	Belarus	Finland	Kenya	Macau	Ukraine
17	Aruba	Dominican Republic	Ghana	Philippines	Rwanda	—N/a
18	Cambodia	Mauritius	Montenegro	Uganda	Vietnam	—N/a
19	Angola	Bangladesh	Ethiopia	Kyrgyzstan	Senegal	—N/a

==== Round 2 ====
- Advanced to the Top 40 via the Head-to-Head challenge.

Group	Country 1	Country 2
1	Brazil	Moldova
2	Nepal	Indonesia
3	China	Venezuela
4	Nigeria	Belarus
5	Mexico	Uganda
6	Philippines	Turkey
7	Mongolia	Guyana
8	Bangladesh	India
9	Ireland	Trinidad and Tobago
10	Paraguay	Georgia

=== Top Model ===
Miss Nigeria, Nyekachi Douglas, won the Top Model competition and became the fourth quarter-finalist of Miss World 2019.

Placement	Contestant
Winner	Nigeria - Nyekachi Douglas
1st runner-up	Vietnam – Lương Thùy Linh
2nd runner-up	India – Suman Rao
3rd runner-up	France – Ophély Mézino
4th runner-up	Uganda – Oliver Nakakande
Top 10	Brazil – Elis Miele; Czech Republic – Denisa Spergerová; Hong Kong – Lila Lam; Kazakhstan – Madina Batyk; Trinidad and Tobago – Tya Jané Ramey
Top 40	Antigua and Barbuda – Taqiyyah Francis; Argentina – Judit Grnja; Australia – Sarah Marschke; Barbados – Che Amor Greenidge; Bosnia and Herzegovina – Ivana Ladan; China – Li Peishan; Croatia – Katarina Mamić; Denmark – Natasja Kunde; Dominican Republic – Alba Marie Blair; Finland – Dana Mononen; Haiti – Alysha Morency; Hungary – Krisztina Nagypál; Indonesia – Princess Megonondo; Italy – Adele Sammartino; Jamaica – Toni-Ann Singh; Kenya – Maria Wavinya; Macau – Yu Yanan; Mexico – Ashley Alvídrez; Moldova – Elizaveta Kuznitova; Montenegro – Mirjana Muratović; Philippines – Michelle Dee; Poland – Milena Sadowska; Puerto Rico – Daniella Rodríguez; Russia – Alina Sanko; Slovakia – Frederika Kurtulíková; South Sudan – Mariah Joseph Maget; Turkey – Simay Rasimoğlu; Ukraine – Marharyta Pasha; Venezuela – Isabella Rodríguez; Wales – Gabriella Jukes

=== Sports ===
Miss British Virgin Islands, Rikkiya Brathwaite, won the Sports competition and became the first quarter-finalist of Miss World 2019.

Final result	Contestant
Winner	British Virgin Islands – Rikkiya Brathwaite
1st runner-up	Nigeria – Nyekachi Douglas
2nd runner-up	Trinidad and Tobago – Tya Jané Ramey
Team Challenge Winner	Green Team

=== Talent ===
Miss Jamaica, Toni-Ann Singh, won the Talent competition and became the second quarter-finalist of Miss World 2019.

Final result	Contestant
Winner	Jamaica – Toni-Ann Singh
1st runner-up	British Virgin Islands – Rikkiya Brathwaite
2nd runner-up	Canada – Naomi Colford
Top 5	Armenia – Liana Voskerchyan; Malta – Nicole Vella
Top 27	Australia – Sarah Marschke; Barbados – Che Amor Greenidge; Bolivia – Iciar Diaz Camacho; China – Li Peishan; Cook Islands – Tajiya Eikura Sahay; Denmark – Natasja Kunde; Gibraltar – Celine Bolaños; Iceland – Kolfinna Mist Austfjörð; India – Suman Rao; Japan – Marika Sera; Luxembourg – Melanie Heynsbroek; Malaysia – Alexis SueAnn Seow; Mongolia – Tsevelmaa Mandakh; Nigeria – Nyekachi Douglas; Panama – Agustina Ruiz Arrechea; Paraguay – Araceli Bobadilla; Slovakia – Frederika Kurtulíková; Tanzania – Sylvia Sebastian; Ukraine – Marharyta Pasha; United States – Emmy Cuvelier; United States Virgin Islands – A'yana Phillips; Wales – Gabriella Jukes

=== Multimedia ===
Miss Nepal, Anushka Shrestha, won the Multimedia competition and became the third quarter-finalist of Miss World 2019.

Final result	Contestant
Winner	Nepal – Anushka Shrestha
1st runner-up	Mexico – Ashley Alvídrez
2nd runner-up	Mongolia – Tsevelmaa Mandakh

=== Beauty with a Purpose ===
For the first time, all 10 finalists were placed in the Top 40 of Miss World 2019 due to their projects and initiatives. Miss Nepal, Anushka Shrestha, won the award and received funding from the Miss World Organization for the establishment of her project.

Final result	Contestant
Winner	Nepal – Anushka Shrestha
Top 10	France – Ophély Mézino; India – Suman Rao; Indonesia – Princess Megonondo; Malaysia – Alexis SueAnn Seow; Mongolia – Tsevelmaa Mandakh; Nigeria – Nyekachi Douglas; Tunisia – Sabrine Mansour; Venezuela – Isabella Rodríguez; Vietnam – Lương Thùy Linh

== Judges ==
The judges' panel for Miss World 2019 were:

- Julia Morley – Chairman of the Miss World Pageant Organization
- Piers Morgan – TV presenter, talk show host, a former judge at Britain's Got Talent and America's Got Talent
- Mike Dixon – Musical Director
- Deborah Lambie – Miss World New Zealand 2015
- Dame Zandra Rhodes – London Fashion designer
- Marsha-Rae Ratcliff, OBE
- Svetoslav Kolchagov, Creative Director and Designer of KolchagovBarba
- Emilio Barba, Creative Director and Designer of KolchagovBarba
- Lady Wilnelia Forsyth – Miss World 1975 from Puerto Rico
- Ksenia Sukhinova – Miss World 2008 from Russia
- Carina Tyrrell – Miss England 2014
- Kamal Ibrahim – Mister World 2010 from Ireland

== Contestants ==
111 contestants competed for the title.

Country/Territory	Contestant	Age (Note: Ages at the time of the pageant)	Hometown
Albania	Atalanta Kërçyku	20	Tirana
Angola	Brezana Da Costa	24	Luanda
Antigua and Barbuda	Taqiyyah Francis	26	St. John's
Argentina	Judit Grnja	18	Villa Ángela
Armenia	Liana Voskerchyan	20	Yerevan
Aruba	Ghislaine Mejia	26	Oranjestad
Australia	Sarah Marschke	20	Sydney
(The Bahamas) Bahamas	Nyah Bandelier	19	Eleuthera
Bangladesh	Rafah Nanjeba Torsa	21	Chittagong
Barbados	Che Amor Greenidge	26	Bridgetown
Belarus	Anastasia Laurynchuk	19	Minsk
Belgium	Elena Castro Suarez	19	Antwerp
Bolivia	Iciar Díaz	23	Santa Cruz de la Sierra
Bosnia and Herzegovina	Ivana Ladan	21	Jajce
Botswana	Oweditse Phirinyane Gofaone	25	Gaborone
Brazil	Elís Miele	20	Serra
British Virgin Islands	Rikkiya Brathwaite	22	Tortola
Bulgaria	Margo Cooper	26	Sofia
Cambodia	Vy Sreyvin	20	Kandal
Canada	Naomi Colford	19	Sydney
Cayman Islands	Jaci Patrick	24	West Bay
Chile	Ignacia Albornoz	18	Santiago
China	Li Peishan	26	Beijing
Colombia	Sara Arteaga Franco	26	Medellín
Cook Islands	Tajiya Eikura Sahay	26	Avarua
Costa Rica	Jessica Jiménez	26	San José
Croatia	Katarina Mamić	23	Lika-Senj
Curaçao	Sharon Meyer	24	Willemstad
Czech Republic	Denisa Spergerová	19	České Budějovice
Denmark	Natasja Kunde	18	Copenhagen
Dominican Republic	Alba Marie Blair	21	Jarabacoa
Ecuador	María Auxiliadora Idrovo	18	Guayaquil
El Salvador	Fatima Mangandi	27	Santa Tecla
England	Bhasha Mukherjee	23	Derby
Equatorial Guinea	Janet Ortiz Oyono	20	Malabo
Ethiopia	Feven Gebreslassie	22	Addis Ababa
Finland	Dana Mononen	19	Helsinki
France	Ophély Mézino	20	Morne-à-l'Eau
(Georgia (country)) Georgia	Nini Gogichaishvili	25	Tbilisi
Ghana	Rebecca Kwabi	26	Accra
Gibraltar	Celine Bolaños	22	Gibraltar
Greece	Rafaela Plastira	20	Trikala
Guadeloupe	Anaïs Lacalmontie	22	Basse-Terre
Guatemala	Dulce María Ramos García	22	Cuilapa
Guinea-Bissau	Leila Samati	21	Bissau
Guyana	Joylyn Conway	20	Georgetown
Haiti	Alysha Morency	25	Port-au-Prince
Honduras	Ana Grisel Romero	21	Olanchito
Hong Kong	Lila Lam	27	Hong Kong
Hungary	Krisztina Nagypál	23	Budapest
Iceland	Kolfinna Mist Austfjörð	22	Reykjavík
India	Suman Rao	20	Udaipur
Indonesia	Princess Megonondo	19	Jambi
(Republic of Ireland) Ireland	Chelsea Farrell	19	County Louth
Italy	Adele Sammartino	24	Pompei
Jamaica	Toni-Ann Singh	23	Saint Thomas
Japan	Marika Sera	17	Kanagawa
Kazakhstan	Madina Batyk	20	Pavlodar
Kenya	Maria Wavinya	19	Nyandarua
Kyrgyzstan	Ekaterina Zabolotnova	24	Bishkek
Laos	Nelamith Xaypannha	19	Vientiane
Luxembourg	Melanie Heynsbroek	20	Luxembourg City
Macau	Yu Yanan	26	Macau
Malaysia	Alexis SueAnn Seow	24	Selangor
Malta	Nicole Vella	20	Valletta
Mauritius	Urvashi Gooriah	20	Port Louis
Mexico	Ashley Alvídrez	20	Ciudad Juárez
Moldova	Elizaveta Kuznitova	19	Tiraspol
Mongolia	Tsevelmaa Mandakh	22	Ulaanbaatar
Montenegro	Mirjana Muratović	19	Podgorica
Myanmar	Khit Lin Latt Yoon	22	Yangon
Nepal	Anushka Shrestha	23	Kathmandu
Netherlands	Brenda Felicia Muste	23	Arnhem
New Zealand	Lucy Brock	24	Auckland
Nicaragua	María Teresa Cortéz	19	Carazo
Nigeria	Nyekachi Douglas	21	Calabar
Northern Ireland	Lauren Eve Leckey	20	Stoneyford
Panama	Agustina Ruiz Arrechea	25	Chitré
Paraguay	Araceli Bobadilla	20	Asunción
Peru	Angella Escudero	23	Sullana
Philippines	Michelle Dee	24	Makati
Poland	Milena Sadowska	20	Oświęcim
Portugal	Inês Brusselmans	24	Oeiras
Puerto Rico	Daniella Rodríguez	21	Bayamón
Russia	Alina Sanko	20	Azov
Rwanda	Meghan Nimwiza	21	Kigali
Samoa	Alalamalae Lata	23	Apia
Scotland	Keryn Matthew	24	Edinburgh
Senegal	Alberta Diatta	20	Ziguinchor
Sierra Leone	Enid Jones-Boston	24	Freetown
Singapore	Sheen Cher	22	Singapore
Slovakia	Frederika Kurtulíková	25	Bratislava
Slovenia	Špela Alič	22	Ljubljana
South Africa	Sasha-Lee Olivier	26	Alberton
South Korea	Lim Ji-yeon	20	Seoul
South Sudan	Mariah Joseph Maget	22	Juba
Spain	María del Mar Aguilera	21	Córdoba
Sri Lanka	Dewmi Thathsarani	21	Sri Jayawardenepura Kotte
Sweden	Daniella Lundqvist	20	Kalmar
Tanzania	Sylvia Sebastian	19	Mwanza
Thailand	Narintorn Chadapattarawalrachoat	22	Pathum Thani
Trinidad and Tobago	Tya Jané Ramey	21	Port of Spain
Tunisia	Sabrine Mansour	24	Mahdia
Turkey	Simay Rasimoğlu	22	Istanbul
Uganda	Oliver Nakakande	25	Bombo
Ukraine	Marharyta Pasha	24	Kharkiv
United States	Emmy Cuvelier	23	Pierre
United States Virgin Islands	A'yana Phillips	24	Saint Thomas
Venezuela	Isabella Rodríguez	26	Petare
Vietnam	Lương Thùy Linh	19	Cao Bằng
Wales	Gabriella Jukes	23	Port Talbot
