= Marjorie Taylor (Jamaican politician) =

Jamaican politician (died 2017)

MP for Kingston East and Port Royal
- In office 30 March 1993 – 18 December 1997
- Preceded by: Michael Manley
- Succeeded by: Phillip Paulwell

Personal details
- Party: People's National Party

Marjorie Taylor (died 14 October 2017) was a Jamaican politician who sat in the Parliament of Jamaica.
