= Faith Gillezeau =

Model and beauty queen from Trinidad and Tobago

- Born: 14 January 1998 (age 28); San Fernando
- Occupations: Model, Pharmacist
- Height: 1.67 m (5 ft 5 1/2 in)
- Beauty pageant titleholder
- Title: Miss Universe Trinidad and Tobago 2023
- Major competitions: Miss Universe Trinidad and Tobago 2023 (Winner); Miss Universe 2023 (Unplaced)

Marion Faith Gillezeau (born 16 January 1998) is a Trinidadian pharmacist, athlete, model and beauty pageant titleholder who was crowned Miss Universe Trinidad and Tobago 2023.

She succeeded Tya Jané Ramey who placed her in the Top 16 at Miss Universe 2022 in New Orleans in January, 2022.

== Background ==
=== Early life ===
Gillezeau was born on 16 January 1998, in San Fernando, Trinidad and Tobago.

== Pageantry ==
=== Miss Universe 2023 ===
Gillezeau was crowned Miss Universe Trinidad and Tobago on the Sunday of July 2 at Queen's Hall, St Ann's in Port of Spain, Trinidad and Tobago. She represented Trinidad and Tobago with the national flag at The 72nd Miss Universe 2023 in El Salvador at the pageant venue Adolfo Pineda National Gymnasium (Gimnasio Nacional Adolfo Pineda) on Saturday November 18, 2023.

Awards and achievements
| Preceded by Tya Jané Ramey | Miss Universe Trinidad and Tobago; 2023 | Succeeded by Jenelle Thongs |
