= Eric Anthony Abrahams =

Jamaican public servant (1940–2011)

Director of Tourism
- In office April 1970 – April 1975

Member of the Jamaican Senate
- In office 1977 – August 1977

Member of the Jamaican House of Representatives, representing East Portland (1980–1983) representing Kingston East and Port Royal (1983–1989)
- In office 1980–1989

Minister of Tourism and Minister of Information
- In office 1980–1984

Personal details
- Born: 5 May 1940
- Died: 7 August 2011 (aged 71)
- Education: University of the West Indies; University of Oxford
- Nickname: Tony

Eric Anthony Abrahams (5 May 1940 – 7 August 2011) was a Jamaican public servant and broadcaster. He was the nation's director of tourism from 1970 to 1975, and minister of tourism and information from 1980 to 1984. After leaving office, he co-created a radio show with Beverley Manley, "The Breakfast Club".

Abrahams was educated at Jamaica College and later at the University of the West Indies and University of Oxford (as a Rhodes Scholar). At Oxford, he was elected president of the Oxford Union, a debating society. In this capacity, he hosted Malcolm X at the university. In Britain, he briefly worked for the BBC as its first black TV reporter. When Abrahams returned to Jamaica, he became involved in the tourism industry, overseeing increased efforts to advertise Jamaica and its culture as the youngest director of tourism yet.

Abrahams was a member of the Jamaican Senate (1977) and a director of Air Jamaica. After being elected to the Jamaican House of Representatives in 1980, the prime minister of Jamaica, Edward Seaga, made him the first dedicated minister of tourism in a Jamaican cabinet. As minister, Abrahams led a revitalization of the nation's tourism industry. He was also an advocate for the 1983 United States invasion of Grenada. Abrahams left his post of minister in 1984, officially for "personal reasons", though the actual reason is unclear. He was a member of the Jamaica Labour Party until 1985 and served four years in parliament as an independent, not running for re-election in 1989.

== Early life and education ==
Eric Anthony Abrahams, also known as "Tony", was born on 5 May 1940, to Eric Abrahams and Lucille Abrahams. His father was a director of a corporation. He was educated at Jamaica College and studied economics, history and English at the University of the West Indies beginning in 1958. Abrahams graduated in 1961 with a Bachelor of Arts from the University of London. (Note: The University of the West Indies operated as an "independent external college" of the University of London from 1948 to 1962.) Abrahams was active in debating and was president of the debating club and competing in the United States. He did not run for the role of president of the college's student union after falling ill with mumps and an eye infection, but was elected vice president in 1959. As vice president, he attended an international congress representing undergraduates in Baghdad. Abrahams was also a skilled cricketer, captaining the University of the West Indies' team, and a mediocre student. He was a Rhodes Scholar and was eventually admitted to St Peter's College at the University of Oxford, where he studied jurisprudence. Abrahams's weak academic record had caused him trouble in admission—St Peter's was the fifth college at Oxford that Abrahams had sought to enter. The other four rejected him because of his poor record. After arriving, the master of St Peter's wrote that there was "no chance" he could finish a degree in three years.

Abrahams occasionally participated in civil rights protests while at Oxford, emerging as a leader at the college known for being charismatic, a talented speaker and criticizing racism. In early 1964 Abrahams became involved in the Oxford Union, a debating society. He was secretary in spring of that year, and was elected to a one year term as president in June. Around 1964 he gave a speaking tour across the Middle East. Abrahams organized the debate held in December 1964, picked the topic, secured funding and television coverage from the BBC, and invited speakers including Malcolm X, who accepted. Abrahams hosted the debate. While Malcolm X was at Oxford for the debate, Abrahams was "gated" in his apartment under house arrest after 6:00pm as he had protested Nelson Mandela's arrest. Protests relating to apartheid had been banned during the visit of the Ambassador of South Africa to the United Kingdom.

== Early career ==
After graduation, Abrahams worked at the BBC, in 1965 becoming the first black TV reporter there. By January 1966 he was reporting for 24 Hours on BBC1. His assignments there included reporting on a coup in Ghana and interviewing François Duvalier in Haiti, as well as reports from Nigeria and London. Abrahams then moved back to Jamaica and on 5 March 1967 started work in the Ministry of Tourism as administrative assistant to the director, at the time E. Stuart Sharpe. In October 1967 he was made assistant director of tourism. Abrahams was named acting director of tourism on 23 December 1969. In March 1970 he toured Florida to look for insights into how to attract tourists. Abrahams also successfully advocated for the lifting of immigration restrictions into the nation. He was made full director of tourism in April 1970. Abrahams was almost thirty years old, the youngest to hold the role. In 1973 Abrahams toured the United States to promote tourism to Jamaica.

As director, Abrahams sought to improve worldwide advertising about traveling to Jamaica, to improve vacation quality there, and make tourism a larger part of Jamaican society. The ministry was restructured under his oversight and new branches established. His initiatives included a "Meet the People" program, October "Tourism Month", and a "Courtesy Corp" tourist police. Abrahams also oversaw the establishment of the Jamaican Association of Villas and Apartments (JAVA), which organized owners who were willing to rent properties into a cooperative. He sought to play into the culture and tradition of Jamaica to make it more appealing to visitors. Some tourist attractions offered windows into rural Jamaican life or Arawak life. Abrahams also worked to develop programs such as rafting on the Martha Brae River.

From 1970 to 1976 Abrahams was executive director of the Private Sector Organization of Jamaica. He was also chairman of the Jamaica Tourist Board around the same time, overseeing a large increase in tourism—tourist arrivals rose 40 percent and "foreign travel receipts" 56 percent, almost doubling the number of guest rooms on the island. Abrahams resigned from his role as director of tourism and the board in April 1975. He was also a director of Air Jamaica, served on the Jamaican Government Air Policy Committee, and negotiated air travel agreements. Abrahams was on the Public Passenger Transport Board and Chairman of the Jamaica Hotel School from 1974 to 1976.

== Political career ==
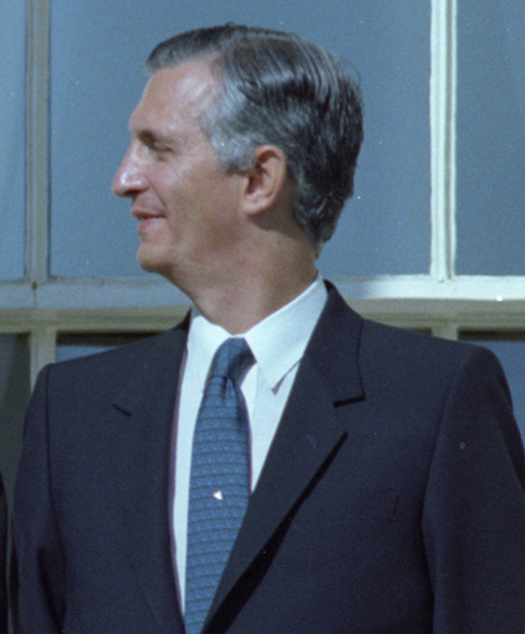
Edward Seaga in 1981

Abrahams was also a politician, initially representing the parliamentary constituency of Eastern Portland in the Jamaican Parliament. In September 1976, he ran for parliament as a member of the Jamaica Labour Party and was defeated by Keith Rhodd, 9,292 to 7,433. In 1977 he became a member of the Jamaican Senate. In August 1977, Abrahams resigned from the senate to work in the Organisation of American States as the director of Multi-National Tourism Programme of the Organisation of American States until 1979. Abrahams also wrote articles for the Jamaica Herald.

In 1980 he was made minister of the Jamaica Labour Party and was elected to Jamaican House of Representatives, defeating Rhodd 10,196 to 7,827. In the elections of 1983 Abrahams switched to represent Kingston East and Port Royal, succeeding Glen Webley. From 1980 to 1985 he was minister of tourism and minister of information. This was the first time there had been a dedicated minister for tourism. Shortly after becoming minister, he reportedly told advertising executives that although the Jamaican government had previously not had kickbacks, "things may be different in the new administration." An advertising executive later described Abrahams as carrying a gun in a briefcase for protection against political unrest when they met in the early 1980s. In 1982, The Globe and Mail described changes he oversaw as a "spectacular recovery for Jamaica tourism", which had declined in the aftermath of the bloody 1980 Jamaican general election. Abrahams divested state-owned hotels and oversaw the creation of a "two-tier currency system" where Jamaica had an "unofficial" and "premium" dollar, with different values. He also led programs that improved existing hotels, developed new tourist attractions, and cleaned up old ones.

Prime Minister Edward Seaga supported the 1983 invasion of Grenada by the United States, as did Abrahams. This may have been an outgrowth of hostility towards Michael Manley's People's National Party. According to an interview he later gave, he was in the Jamaican delegation that met with members of the Organisation of Eastern Caribbean States (OECS) and led to an early request for American involvement in Grenada. Abrahams and Neville Gallimore were later the main Jamaican representatives at a Caribbean Community conference where intervention in the region was further discussed and shortly afterwards a formal plea was issued for American intervention. Abrahams worked to persuade Trinidad to support the invasion and made use of his contacts from Oxford with politicians such as Wahid Ali, president of the senate. He was largely unsuccessful. In 1984 Abrahams told a conference of the Inter American Press Association that poverty posed the largest threat to freedom and defended intervention in Grenada as a necessary "rescue mission".

Seaga removed Abrahams from his ministerial post after a disagreement, although he formally resigned in 1984 for "personal reasons". Abrahams told The Daily Gleaner the resignation was aimed at allowing him to develop his career in tourism consulting internationally. Upon Abrahams departure from the post Seaga publicly said "I pay tribute to the job he has done in managing the recovery of tourism during his three and a half years as minister. The current success now enjoyed is in no small measure due to his efforts." The Daily Gleaner praised his accomplishments but maintained that he had not completely revealed "all the circumstances" surrounding his resignation. The paper speculated that the move might have been provoked by Abraham's anger at the party's choice to fire several people or the party feeling he had peaked. Abrahams left the party, remaining in parliament as an independent. In 1986 Abrahams sought to be made Leader of the Opposition, a request that was not entertained. That same year he announced that he would not seek re-election due to "the political violence and character assassination which was the order of the day." Abrahams intended the withdrawal to be temporary and reinforced his intent to work on developing a tourism consultancy. He left parliament in 1989.

== Libel suit ==
In 1987, the Associated Press (AP) published a story which alleged that Abrahams was bribed by Young & Rubicam, an American advertising company, when serving as minister of tourism to grant them a $29 million contract for an advertising campaign in the early 1980s. The campaign's theme was "Come back to Jamaica". Abrahams and an advisor, Arnold Foote Jr., were reportedly offered a third of Young & Rubicam's 15 percent commission as a kickback and given $900,000 as a bribe. In order to hide the profits, Abrahams and Foote allegedly created "Ad Ventures Ltd.", a fake advertising corporation based in the Cayman Islands. The Associated Press's story was republished by two Jamaican newspapers, The Daily Gleaner and The Jamaica Star. Young & Rubicam was indicted in 1989 in Connecticut for the bribery. In 1990, the corporation pled guilty. Abrahams was indicted but never prosecuted for accepting the bribes.

In 1987, Abrahams sued The Daily Gleaner and The Jamaica Star for libel. He also filed a defamation suit against the author Robin Moore who had testified in the bribery case which was dismissed by judge Peter C. Dorsey because Abrahams would not participate in pretrial discovery. He appealed the decision The two Jamaican papers sued the AP for indemnity because they had used the AP's wire reports. The AP sought for the transcripts of testimony that was used to indict Young & Rubicam to be made public for the case. Abrahams sued Young & Rubicam in 1991 on charges that included libel and slander. In 1993 Moore was ordered to pay Abrahams $6.3 million. On 17 July 1996, the Gleaner Company, owner of The Daily Gleaner, was ordered by a jury to pay Abrahams J$80.7 million in damages. The company appealed the decision, which they considered "manifestly excessive", to the Jamaica Court of Appeals. The Committee to Protect Journalists reported on the case, describing it as having "a chilling effect on the entire Jamaican media." By 1999, the decision was still being appealed. In 2000, the amount was lowered by the Court of Appeals to J$35 million. The case was settled in July 2003 at J$35 million.

== Later career ==
In 1990 Abe Dabdoub, a politician and attorney, wrote a letter to the JLP alleging that he had evidence proving members of the party had been spied on and hit men were hired to kill himself and Abrahams. In 1992, Abrahams and Beverley Anderson-Manley created a radio show that focused on current events, "The Breakfast Club". The show aired on KLAS Radio. Abrahams was described by a former host of the show as living and breathing the show, and his obituary in The Daily Gleaner described it as his "crowning achievement". "The Breakfast Club" was intended to have a similar structure to morning television news shows in the US with emphasis on panel discussions. In 1997 the show was described as possibly the most influential radio shows on KLAS, including prominent figures and attracting high advertising rates.

When Rose Leon was assassinated in 1999, Manley used the show to apologize for anything she might have done to contribute to the instability of the nation and the Jamaican political conflict that led to Leon's death. Abrahams and other politicians similarly admitted partial fault. Abrahams said he would fully discuss his actions if he was granted unconditional immunity and said that "[w]e were part of the process, we are part of a failed state and as such we failed the country. With all the opportunity I had, I just slipped into the political system without really bucking it." In 2005 Edward Seaga sued Abrahams and the Breakfast Club show for libel over a 1999 airing. He won after Abrahams did not show up for trial. Abrahams left the show in 2010 as his bone cancer became worse.

== Death and funeral ==
Abrahams died on 7 August 2011, and his funeral was held at the St Andrew Parish Church. He had two children and six grandchildren at the time of his death. A tribute was paid by Prime Minister of Jamaica Bruce Golding, who said "He was never afraid to challenge the status quo or demand change. He broke down many barriers".

== Bibliography ==
- Gourevitch, Philip; Murphy, Richard (2000). Attacks on the press in 1999. Committee to Protect Journalists. ISBN 978-0-944823-19-4.
- Attacks on the press in 1996 : a worldwide survey. Committee to Protect Journalists. 1997. ISBN 978-0-944823-16-3.
- Ambar, Saladin (2014). Malcolm X at Oxford Union: Racial Politics in a Global Era. OUP USA. ISBN 978-0-19-997547-1.
- Bryan, Patrick E. (2011). Edward Seaga and the Challenges of Modern Jamaica. University of the West Indies Press. ISBN 978-976-640-222-8.
- Tuck, Stephen (2014). The Night Malcolm X Spoke at the Oxford Union: A Transatlantic Story of Antiracist Protest. University of California Press. ISBN 978-0-520-95998-9.
