= Rosanna Chichester =

- Born: 1989 (age 36–37)
- Beauty pageant titleholder
- Title: Miss British Virgin Islands 2013
- Eye color: Black
- Major competitions: Miss World 2014 (Unplaced)

Rosanna Chichester (born 1989) is a Virgin Islander dancer, model and beauty pageant titleholder who was crowned Miss British Virgin Islands 2013 and represented British Virgin Islands at Miss World 2014.

== Early life ==
Rosanna is a First Caribbean International Bank employee. She is also a Dance Teacher at the New Testament Church of God and a volunteer for both the Family Support Network and the BVI Cancer Society.

== Pageantry ==
=== Miss British Virgin Islands 2013 ===
Rosanna Chichester was crowned Miss British Virgin Islands 2013 at the Multi-Purpose Sports Complex in Road Town on 4 August. Miss Chichester walked away with nearly all of the individual prizes including for Miss Poise, Miss Popularity, Best BVI Promotion, Best Swim Wear, Best Cultural Costume, Best Evening Wear and Miss Intellect.

=== Miss World 2014 ===
Rosanna competed at Miss World 2014 in London but was unplaced.

Awards and achievements
Preceded by Sharie De Castro	Miss British Virgin Islands; 2013	Succeeded by Jaynene Jno Lewis
