= A'yana Phillips =

Miss British Virgin Islands 2018, contestant in Miss Universe 2018

- Born: A'yana Keshelle Phillips; 1 September 1995 (age 31); Tortola, British Virgin Islands
- Height: 1.70 m (5 ft 7 in)
- Beauty pageant titleholder
- Title: Miss British Virgin Islands 2018; Miss World US Virgin Islands 2019
- Hair color: Black
- Eye color: Black
- Major competitions: Miss British Virgin Islands 2017; (2nd Runner-Up); Miss British Virgin Islands 2018; (Winner); Miss Universe 2018; (Unplaced); Miss World US Virgin Islands 2019; (Winner); Miss World 2019; (Unplaced)

A'yana Keshelle Phillips (born 1 September 1995) is a Virgin Islander model and beauty pageant titleholder from both the British Virgin Islands and the United States Virgin Islands who was crowned Miss British Virgin Islands 2018 and Miss US Virgin Islands 2019. She represented the British Virgin Islands in the Miss Universe 2018 pageant but unplaced. She also represented the United States Virgin Islands at Miss World 2019.

== Pageantry ==
=== Miss British Virgin Islands 2017 ===
On 6 August 2017, Phillips finished as the second runner-up at Miss British Virgin Islands 2017.

=== Miss British Virgin Islands 2018 ===
Phillips was crowned Miss British Virgin Islands 2018 at the coronation ceremony held on 5 August 2018 at the festival village. She succeeded outgoing Miss British Virgin Islands 2017 Khephra Sylvester.

=== Miss Universe 2018 ===
Phillips represented the British Virgin Islands at Miss Universe 2018 in Bangkok, Thailand and was unplaced.

=== Miss World U.S. Virgin Islands 2019 ===
Phillips competed in Miss World USVI 2019 and won in October 2019. She succeeded Kyrelle Thomas.

=== Miss World 2019 ===
Phillips will represent the United States Virgin Islands at the Miss World 2019 in London, United Kingdom.

Awards and achievements
Preceded by Khephra Sylvester	Miss British Virgin Islands; 2018	Succeeded by Bria Smith
Preceded by Kyrelle Thomas	Miss World U.S. Virgin Islands; 2019	Succeeded by Adisha Penn
