= Michael Manley =

Prime Minister of Jamaica (1972–1980; 1989–1992)

The Most Honourable Michael Manley ON OM OCC PC
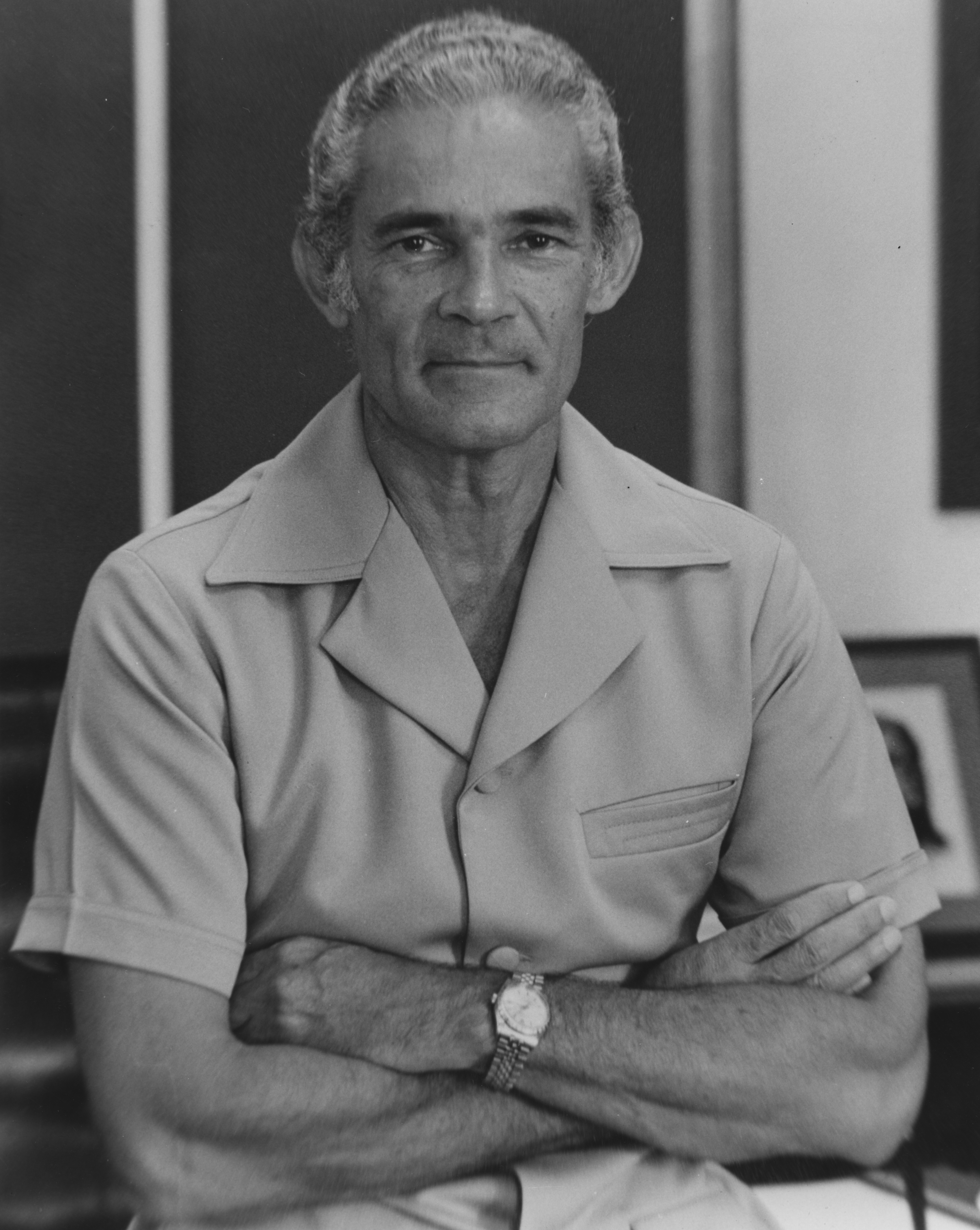
- Manley c. 1970s

4th Prime Minister of Jamaica
- In office 10 February 1989 – 30 March 1992
- Monarch: Elizabeth II
- Governors General: Sir Florizel Glasspole; Sir Edward Zacca (acting); Sir Howard Cooke
- Deputy: P. J. Patterson
- Preceded by: Edward Seaga
- Succeeded by: P. J. Patterson
- In office 2 March 1972 – 1 November 1980
- Monarch: Elizabeth II
- Governors General: Sir Clifford Campbell; Sir Herbert Duffus (acting); Sir Florizel Glasspole
- Deputy: David Coore; P. J. Patterson
- Preceded by: Hugh Shearer
- Succeeded by: Edward Seaga

Leader of the Opposition
- In office 1 November 1980 – 10 February 1989
- Monarch: Elizabeth II
- Prime Minister: Edward Seaga
- Preceded by: Edward Seaga
- Succeeded by: Edward Seaga
- In office 1969 – 2 March 1972
- Monarch: Elizabeth II
- Prime Minister: Hugh Shearer
- Preceded by: Norman Manley
- Succeeded by: Hugh Shearer

MP for Kingston East and Port Royal
- In office 1989–1993
- Preceded by: Eric Anthony Abrahams
- Succeeded by: Marjorie Taylor

Personal details
- Born: Michael Norman Manley; 10 December 1924 St. Andrew, Colony of Jamaica, British Empire
- Died: 6 March 1997 (aged 72) Kingston, Jamaica
- Resting place: National Heroes Park
- Party: People's National Party
- Spouses: Jacqueline Kamellard (m. 1946; div. 1951) Thelma Verity (m. 1955; div. 1960) Barbara Lewars (m. 1966; died 1968) Beverley Anderson (m. 1972; div. 1993) Glynne Ewart (m. 1992)
- Children: 5, including Rachel
- Parent(s): Norman Manley; Edna Manley
- Education: London School of Economics

Military service
- Allegiance: Canada
- Branch/service: Royal Canadian Air Force (RCAF)
- Years of service: 1943–1945
- Rank: Pilot officer
- Battles/wars: World War II

Michael Norman Manley (10 December 1924 – 6 March 1997) was a Jamaican politician, trade unionist and journalist who served as the fourth Prime Minister of Jamaica, from 1972 to 1980, and from 1989 to 1992. Manley championed a democratic socialist programme, and has been described as a populist, although many in the country feared he would turn Jamaica into a communist state. He remains one of Jamaica's most popular prime ministers.

== Early life ==
Michael Manley was the second son of premier Norman Washington Manley and artist Edna Manley. He studied at Jamaica College between 1935 and 1943. He attended the Antigua State College and then served in the Royal Canadian Air Force during World War II. In 1945, he enrolled at the London School of Economics. At the LSE, he was influenced by Fabian socialism and the writings of Harold Laski. He graduated in 1949, and returned to Jamaica to serve as an editor and columnist for the newspaper Public Opinion. At about the same time, he became involved in the trade union movement, becoming a negotiator for the National Workers Union. In August 1953, he became a full-time official of that union.

== Entry into politics ==
When his father was elected premier of Jamaica in 1955, Manley resisted entering politics, not wanting to be seen as capitalizing on his family name. However, in 1962, he accepted an appointment to the Senate of the Parliament of Jamaica. He won election to the Jamaican House of Representatives for the Central Kingston constituency in 1967.

After his father's retirement in 1969, Manley was elected leader of the People's National Party, defeating Vivian Blake. During the campaign for the 1972 Jamaican general election, the PNP organised a travelling "Musical Bandwagon" featuring performers including Bob Marley, Rita Marley, Alton Ellis, Dennis Brown, and Judy Mowatt. Manley also used Rastafarian and biblical imagery, adopting the biblical persona of "Joshua" and carrying the "Rod of Correction", a staff given to him by Haile Selassie. Delroy Wilson's song "Better Must Come" was adopted as a PNP campaign anthem, although Wilson maintained that it had not been written about politics.

He then served as leader of the Opposition until the PNP won the 1972 general election.

== First Premiership (1972–1980) ==
In the 1972 Jamaican general election, Manley defeated the unpopular incumbent prime minister, Hugh Shearer of the Jamaica Labour Party, as his People's National Party swept to a landslide victory with 37 of 53 seats.

An anti-capitalist, Manley was an advocate of building a socialist system in Jamaica. This reflected the ideology of his own People's National Party, with one study noting that

With its firm commitment to a socialist path, the party explicitly rejected both communism and capitalism. Manley had long harboured an opposition to communism largely because its totalitarian tenets contradicted his deep respect for democracy. In the 1972 elections, Manley made it clear to the people that "I am opposed to communism, passionately. I am opposed...to all forms of subversion, passionately. Let us understand that it is not necessary to destroy to make change." Although the party willingly accepted capitalists within its ranks as part of its desire to build national consensus, the PNP opposed "capitalism as the system upon which to base the future of Jamaica [because] this system involves the exploitation of people and obliges individuals to pursue private gain at the expense of their fellow citizens without regard to any other interest."

=== Domestic reforms ===
Manley instituted a series of socio-economic reforms that produced mixed results. Although he was a Jamaican from an elite family, Manley's successful trade union background helped him to maintain a close relationship with the country's poor majority, and he was a dynamic, popular leader. Unlike his father, who had a reputation for being formal and businesslike, the younger Manley moved easily among people of all strata and made Parliament accessible to the people by abolishing the requirement for men to wear jackets and ties to its sittings. In this regard he started a fashion revolution, often preferring the Kariba suit, a type of formal bush-jacket suit with trousers and worn without a shirt and tie.

Under Manley, Jamaica established a minimum wage for all workers, including domestic workers.

In 1974, Manley proposed free education from primary school to university. The introduction of universally free secondary education was a major step in removing the institutional barriers to private sector and preferred government jobs that required secondary diplomas. The PNP government in 1974 also formed the Jamaica Movement for the Advancement of Literacy (JAMAL), which administered adult education programs with the goal of involving 100,000 adults a year.

Land reform expanded under his administration. Historically, land tenure in Jamaica has been rather inequitable. Project Land Lease (introduced in 1973), attempted an integrated rural development approach, providing tens of thousands of small farmers with land, technical advice, inputs such as fertilizers, and access to credit.

The minimum voting age was lowered to 18 years, while equal pay for women was introduced. Maternity leave was also introduced, while the government outlawed the stigma of illegitimacy. The Masters and Servants Act was abolished, and a Labour Relations and Industrial Disputes Act provided workers and their trade unions with enhanced rights. The National Housing Trust was established, providing "the means for most employed people to own their own homes," and greatly stimulated housing construction, with more than 40,000 houses built between 1974 and 1980.

Subsidised meals, transportation and uniforms for schoolchildren from disadvantaged backgrounds were introduced, together with free education at primary, secondary, and tertiary levels. Special employment programmes were also launched, together with programmes designed to combat illiteracy. Increases in pensions and poor relief were carried out, along with a reform of local government taxation, an increase in youth training, an expansion of day care centres, and an upgrading of hospitals.

A worker's participation programme was introduced, together with a new mental health law and the family court. Free health care for all Jamaicans was introduced, while health clinics and a paramedical system in rural areas were established. Various clinics were also set up to facilitate access to medical drugs. Spending on education was significantly increased, while the number of doctors and dentists in the country rose. Project Lend Lease, an agricultural programme designed to provide rural labourers and smallholders with more land through tenancy, was introduced, together with a National Youth Service Programme for high school graduates to teach in schools, vocational training, and the literacy programme, comprehensive rent and price controls, protection for workers against unfair dismissal, subsidies (in 1973) on basic food items, and the automatic recognition of unions in the workplace.

Manley was the first Jamaican prime minister to support Jamaican republicanism (the replacement of the constitutional monarchy with a republic). In 1975, his government established a commission into constitutional reform, which recommended that Jamaica become a republic. In July 1977, after a march to commemorate the Morant Bay rebellion, Manley announced that Jamaica would become a republic by 1981. This did not occur, however.

=== Diplomacy ===
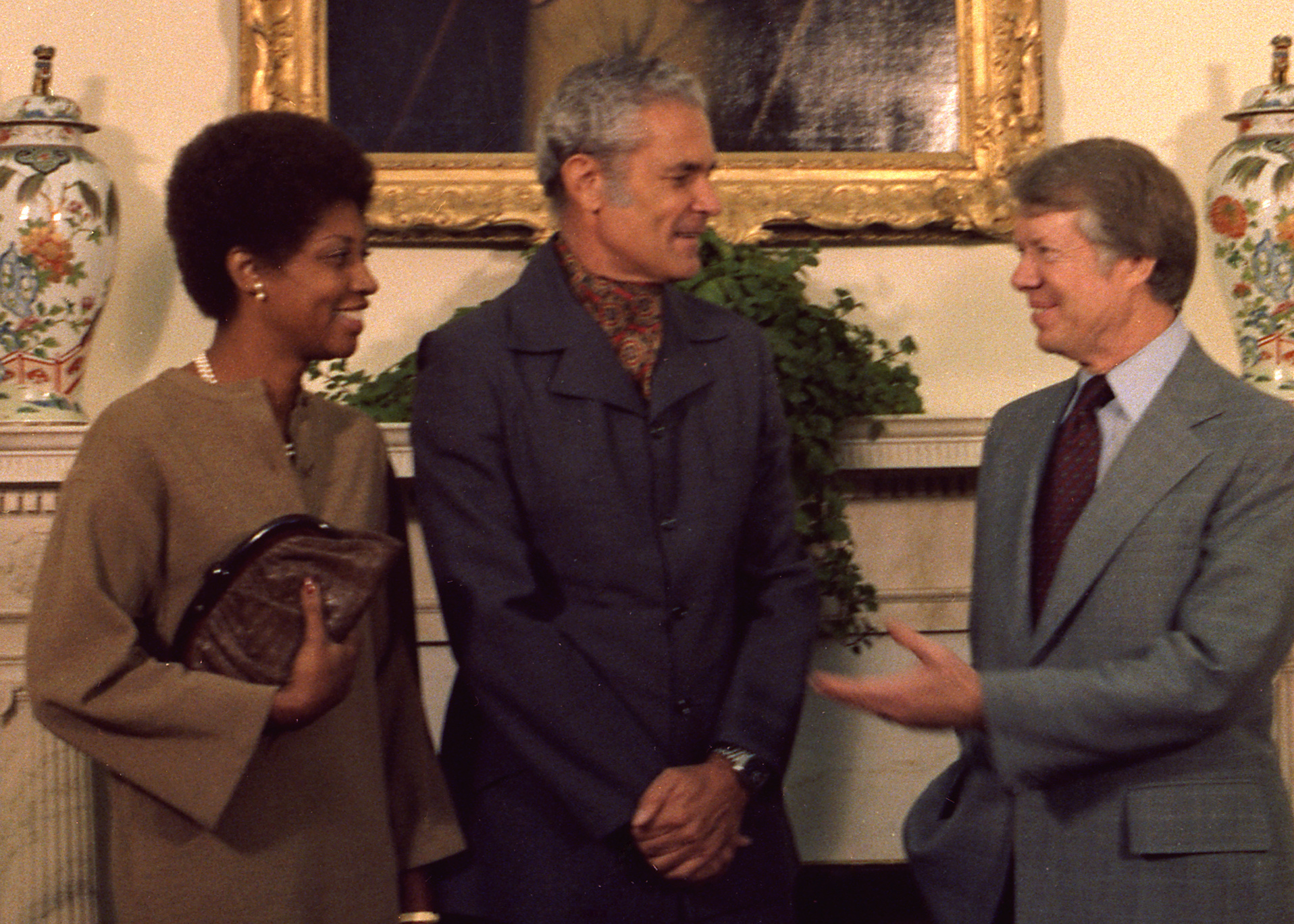
Manley and his fourth wife Beverley with US president Jimmy Carter in 1977

Manley developed close friendships with several communist and socialist leaders, foremost of whom were Julius Nyerere of Tanzania, Olof Palme of Sweden, and Fidel Castro of Cuba. Manley's support for Cuba sending troops to Angola during the Angolan Civil War was criticized by Henry Kissinger and others, and led to a worsening of relations between the US and Jamaica.

In December 1977, Manley visited President Jimmy Carter at the White House to remedy the situation, and relations improved somewhat. Details of the meeting, however, were never disclosed.

In a speech given at the 1979 meeting of the Non-Aligned Movement, Manley strongly pressed for the development of an alliance between the Non-Aligned movement and the Soviet Union to battle imperialism: "All anti-imperialists know that the balance of forces in the world shifted irrevocably in 1917 when there was a movement and a man in the October Revolution, and Lenin was the man." Despite some international opposition — especially from the US and the OAS —, Manley deepened and strengthened Jamaica's ties with Cuba, maintaining friendly relations with Fidel Castro, and paying an official visit to the country in 1975.

=== Violence ===
Manley was Prime Minister when Jamaica experienced a significant escalation of its political culture of violence. Supporters of his opponent Edward Seaga and the Jamaica Labour Party (JLP) and Manley's People's National Party (PNP) engaged in a bloody struggle which began before the 1976 election and ended when Seaga was installed as prime minister in 1980. While the violent political culture was not invented by Seaga or Manley, and had its roots in conflicts between the parties from as early as the beginning of the two-party system in the 1940s, political violence reached unprecedented levels in the 1970s. Indeed, the two elections accompanied by the greatest violence were those (1976 and 1980) in which Seaga was trying to unseat Manley.

In response to a wave of killings in 1974, Manley oversaw the passage of the Gun Court Act and the Suppression of Crime Act, giving the police and the army new powers to seal off and disarm high-violence neighborhoods. The Gun Court imposed a mandatory sentence of indefinite imprisonment with hard labour for all firearms offences, and ordinarily tried cases in camera, without a jury. Manley declared that "There is no place in this society for the gun, now or ever."

Violence flared in January 1976 in anticipation of elections. A state of emergency was declared by Manley's party the PNP in June and 500 people, including some prominent members of the JLP, were accused of trying to overthrow the government and were detained, without charges, in the South Camp Prison at the Up-Park Camp military headquarters. During the emergency, according to a report published on 2 November 1977, by investigative reporters Ernest Volkman and John Cummings of the New York newspaper Newsday, the U.S. Central Intelligence Agency (CIA) plotted Manley's assassination, with attempts that "were supposed to have taken place" on 14 July 1976 in Jamaica, and during a visit later in the year to Toronto. Manley's response to the report was "I can confirm not a shot was fired."

Elections were held on 15 December in the 1976 Jamaican general election, while the state of emergency was still in effect. The PNP was returned to office, winning 47 seats to the JLP's 13. The turnout was a very high 85 percent. The state of emergency continued into the next year. Extraordinary powers granted the police by the Suppression of Crime Act of 1974 continued to the end of the 1990s.

Violence continued to blight political life in the 1970s. Gangs armed by both parties fought for control of urban constituencies. In the election year of 1980 over 800 Jamaicans were killed.

In the 1980 Jamaican general election, Seaga became Prime Minister after the JLP won 51 of the 60 seats.

== Leader of the Opposition (1980–1989) ==
As Leader of the Opposition, Manley became an outspoken critic of the new conservative administration. He strongly opposed intervention in Grenada after Prime Minister Maurice Bishop was overthrown and executed. Immediately after committing Jamaican troops to Grenada in 1983, Seaga called a snap election – two years early – on the pretext that Dr. Paul Robertson, General Secretary of the PNP, had called for his resignation. Manley, who may have been taken by surprise by the manoeuvre, led his party in a boycott of the elections, and so the Jamaica Labour Party won all seats in parliament against only marginal opposition in six of the sixty electoral constituencies.

In 1980, Manley gave a series of public lectures at Columbia University in New York.

Seaga's failure to deliver on his promises to the US and foreign investors, as well as complaints of governmental incompetence in the wake Hurricane Gilbert's devastation in 1988, contributed to his defeat in the 1989 elections. The PNP won 45 seats to the JLP's 15.

== Second Premiership (1989–1992) ==
By 1989, some right-wing critics had begun to assert that Manley had softened his socialist rhetoric, explicitly advocating a role for private enterprise.

Manley's second term focused on liberalizing Jamaica's economy, with the pursuit of a programme that stood in marked contrast to the more social democratic economic policies pursued by Manley's first government. Various measures were, however, undertaken to cushion the negative effects of austerity and structural adjustment. A Social Support Programme was introduced to provide welfare assistance for poor Jamaicans. In addition, the programme focused on creating direct employment, training, and credit for much of the population.

The government also announced a 50% increase in the amount of nutritional assistance for the most vulnerable groups (including pregnant women, nursing mothers, and children). A small number of community councils were also created. In addition, a limited land reform programme was carried out that leased and sold land to small farmers, and land plots were granted to hundreds of farmers. The government had an admirable record in housing provision, while measures were also taken to protect consumers from illegal and unfair business practices.

In 1992, citing health reasons, Manley stepped down as Prime Minister and PNP leader. His former Deputy Prime Minister, P. J. Patterson, assumed both offices.

== Family ==
Manley was married five times. In 1946, he married Jacqueline Kamellard, but the marriage was dissolved in 1951. In 1955, he married Thelma Verity, the adopted daughter of Sir Philip Sherlock, OM and his wife Grace Verity; in 1960, this marriage was also dissolved. In 1966, Manley married Barbara Lewars (died in 1968); in 1972, he married Beverley Anderson, but the marriage was dissolved in 1990. Beverley wrote The Manley Memoirs in June 2008. Michael Manley's final marriage was to Glynne Ewart in 1992.

Manley had five children from his five marriages: Rachel Manley, Joseph Manley, Sarah Manley, Natasha Manley, and David Manley.

== Retirement and death ==
Manley wrote seven books, including the award-winning A History of West Indies Cricket, in which he discussed the links between cricket and West Indian nationalism. The other books he wrote include The Politics of Change (1974), A Voice in the Workplace (1975), The Search for Solutions, The Poverty of Nations, Up the Down Escalator, and Jamaica: Struggle in the Periphery.

On 6 March 1997, Manley died of prostate cancer, the same day as another Caribbean politician, Cheddi Jagan of Guyana. He was honoured with a state funeral on 16 March with religious services held at the Holy Trinity Cathedral, attended by Cuban President Fidel Castro, Trinidadian Prime Minister Basdeo Panday, and Haitian President René Préval, as well as other various leaders and delegates from the Caribbean. He is interred at the National Heroes Park, where his father Norman Manley is also interred. Photographer Maria LaYacona's portrait of Manley appears on the Jamaican $2,000 note alongside a portrait of Edward Seaga.

== Honours ==
- 1973: Order of the Liberator, Venezuela
- 1976: Order of José Martí
- 1978: United Nations Medal
- 1989: Member of the Privy Council of the United Kingdom (P.C.)
- 1992: Order of Merit of Jamaica (O.M.)
- 1994: Order of the Caribbean Community (O.O.C.)

Posthumously:

- Order of the Nation (O.N.)

== Works ==
- The Politics of Change: A Jamaican Testament
- A Voice at the Workplace: Reflections on Colonialism and the Jamaican Worker
- Global Challenge: From Crisis to Cooperation; Breaking the North-South Stalemate
- The Poverty of Nations: Reflections on Underdevelopment and the World Economy
- Up The Down Escalator: Development and the International Economy – A Jamaican Case Study
- Jamaica: Struggle in the Periphery
- A History of West Indies Cricket

== Bibliography ==
- Henke, Holger (2000). Between Self-Determination and Dependency: Jamaica's foreign relations, 1972–1989. Kingston: University of the West Indies Press, 2000.
- Levi, Darrell E. (1990). Michael Manley: the making of a leader. Athens, GA: University of Georgia Press, 1990.

Political offices
Preceded by Hugh Shearer	Prime Minister of Jamaica; 1972–1980	Succeeded by Edward Seaga
Preceded by Edward Seaga	Prime Minister of Jamaica; 1989–1992	Succeeded by P. J. Patterson
