= Toni-Ann Singh =

Jamaican beauty queen, Miss World 2019

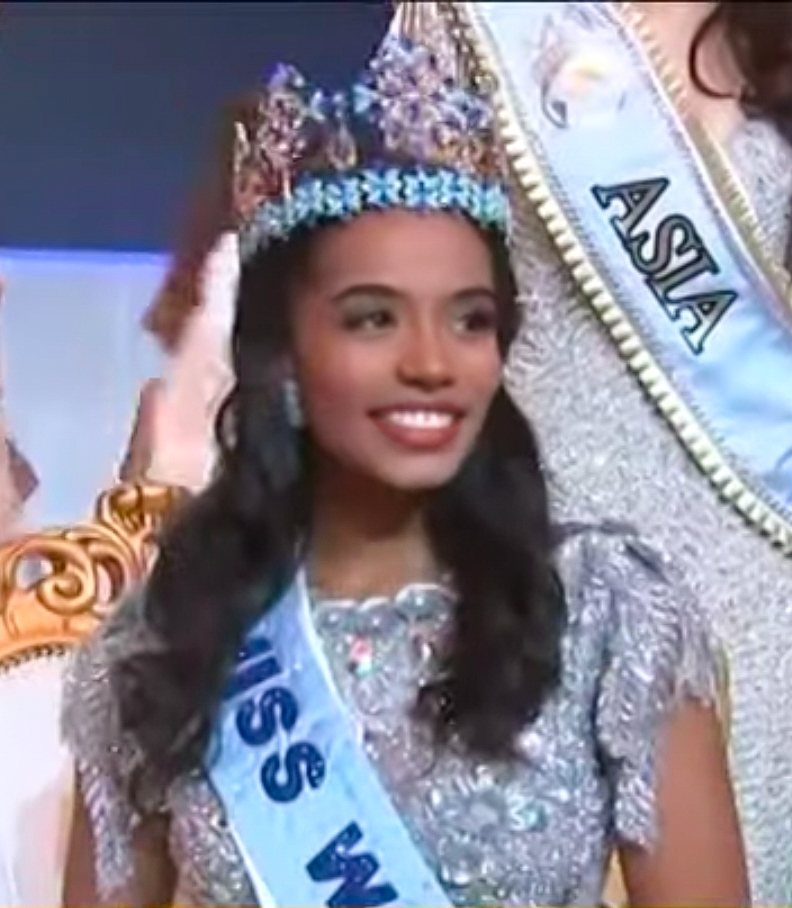
- Singh in 2019
- Born: February 1, 1996 (age 30); Morant Bay, Jamaica
- Education: Florida State University
- Height: 5 ft 6 in (1.67 m)
- Beauty pageant titleholder
- Title: Miss Jamaica World 2019; Miss World 2019
- Hair color: Black
- Eye color: Brown
- Major competitions: Miss Jamaica World 2019 (Winner); Miss World 2019 (Winner)

Toni-Ann Singh (born February 1, 1996) is a Jamaican beauty pageant titleholder who won Miss World 2019 and is the fourth woman from Jamaica to win Miss World. She is also the longest-reigning Miss World in the history of the pageant. She was previously crowned Miss Jamaica World 2019.

== Early life and education ==
Singh was born in Morant Bay, Jamaica. She is of Dougla heritage, with her mother being of Afro-Jamaican descent, and her father being of Indo-Jamaican descent.

Her family migrated to the United States when Singh was aged nine, settling in Florida. She attended Florida State University in Tallahassee, where she graduated with a degree in women's studies and psychology.

== Career ==
=== Miss Jamaica World 2019 ===
On 21 September 2019, Singh won Miss Jamaica World 2019, at the Jamaica Pegasus Hotel. Afterwards, Singh received the right to represent Jamaica at Miss World 2019.

=== Miss World 2019 ===
Singh left for London in November 2019, to participate in the Miss World pre-pageant activities. Singh placed in the top 40 of the Top Model competition and won the talent competition, which granted her direct entry into the top 40 semifinals. Miss World 2019 Finals was held on 14 December at ExCeL London, where Singh advanced from the top 40 to the top 12, and ultimately to the top five.

During the top five question and answer round, she was asked by Piers Morgan - "Why should you win the title of Miss World 2019?", Singh replied:

I think I represent something special...a generation of women who are pushing forward to change the world. I don't consider myself better than any other girls on the stage, but I will say that my passion for women and making sure that they have had the same opportunities that I have had, is something that sets me apart.

She was subsequently asked, "Who is the most inspiring woman in the world for you?", Singh replied:

The most inspiring woman to me is my mother. Now I must say, if my mother and my father are the roots, and I'm the tree, then really, any work that I do, anything that I'm able to change in the world...It is the fruits of their labor and I watched her pour everything into me, even at the sacrifice of her own wants and her needs, and that's why I am able to sit before you today.

At the end of the event she was crowned Miss World 2019 by the previous winner Vanessa Ponce of Mexico. The first runner-up was Ophély Mézino of France and the second runner-up Suman Rao of India.

Singh is the fourth Jamaican to hold the title, with the last being Lisa Hanna who was crowned Miss World 1993, and the first black woman to win Miss World since Agbani Darego of Nigeria won Miss World 2001. Her win also made 2019 the first ever year that black women won two of the Big Four international beauty pageants, after Zozibini Tunzi became South Africa's first black woman to have won the Miss Universe title.

During her reign as Miss World, she lived in England and visited Indonesia, Nepal, Puerto Rico, USA, Mauritius, South Africa, and Jamaica.

Awards and achievements
Preceded by (Mexico) Vanessa Ponce	Miss World; 2019	Succeeded by (Poland) Karolina Bielawska
Preceded by Kadijah Robinson	Miss Jamaica World; 2019	Succeeded by Khalia Hall
