= Maria Wavinya =

Kenyan model and beauty queen

Maria Nyamai Wavinya
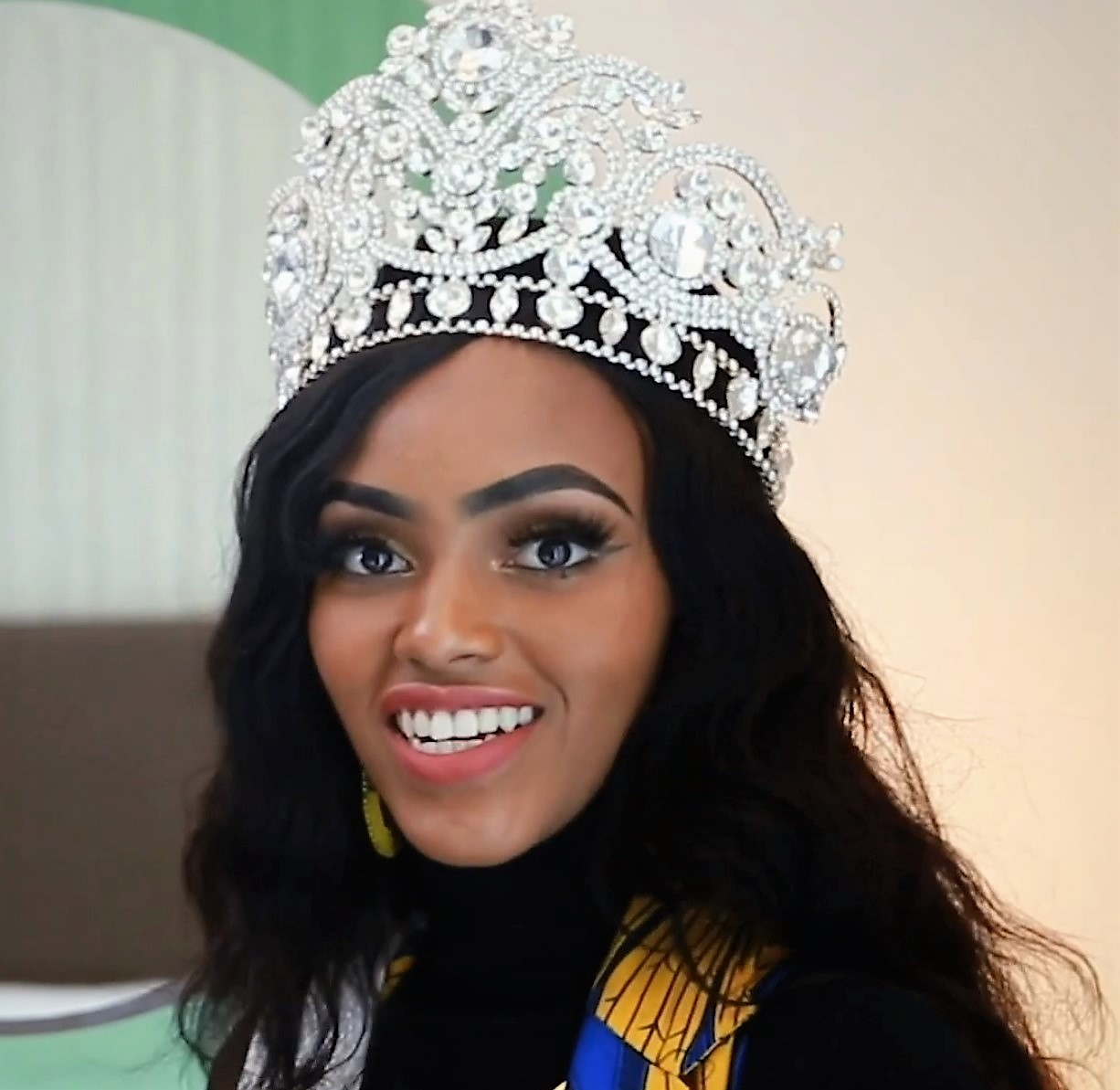
- Wavinya on Capital FM Kenya in 2019
- Born: 27 February 2001 (age 25)
- Beauty pageant titleholder
- Title: Miss World Kenya 2019
- Hair color: Black
- Eye color: Black
- Major competitions: Miss World Kenya 2019 (Winner); Miss World 2019 (Top 12)

Maria Wavinya (born 27 February 2001) is a Kenyan model and beauty pageant titleholder who was crowned Miss World Kenya 2019. She represented Kenya at Miss World 2019 and was placed in the top 12. She was the girlfriend to Khalif Kairo, a car business dealer in Nairobi Kenya.

== Personal life ==
Maria is from Nyandarua County, Kenya. She was raised by a single mom in Mombasa, who died when she was just 12 years old, forcing her to relocate to live with her grandparents in the upcountry. She went to Sasumwa Primary School in Kinangop Constituency and Mary Mother of God Primary school in Kilifi Constituency before moving to Manunga Secondary School in Kipipiri Constituency. Maria completed her high school from St. Teresa High school. She is currently pursuing a diploma in International Relations and Diplomacy and hopes to be an ambassador of her country in time to come.

== Pageantry ==
Maria participated in Miss Tourism Nyandarua in May 2019 and was placed fifth, thus failing to capture the crown.

=== Miss World Kenya 2019 ===
On 5 October 2019, Maria was crowned winner of Miss World Kenya 2019 at a ceremony held at Two Rivers Mall, Nairobi, Kenya.

=== Miss World 2019 ===
On 14 December 2019, Maria reached the top 12 at Miss World 2019.
