= Avionne Mark =

Trinidadian model and beauty queen

- Born: Avionne Mark; February 11, 1989 (age 37); Champs Fleurs, Trinidad and Tobago
- Height: 5 ft 9 in (1.75 m)
- Beauty pageant titleholder
- Title: Miss Trinidad and Tobago 2012
- Hair color: Brown
- Eye color: Brown
- Major competitions: Miss Trinidad and Tobago 2012 (Winner); Miss Universe 2012 (Unplaced)

Avionne Mark (born February 11, 1989) is a Trinidadian model and beauty pageant titleholder who won Miss Trinidad and Tobago 2012. She rightfully earned the opportunity to represent her country in Miss Universe 2012.

Awards and achievements
Preceded by Gabrielle Walcott	Miss Trinidad and Tobago; 2012	Succeeded by Catherine Miller
