= Sheroma Hodge =

British model (born 1985)

Sheroma Hodge-Philip
- Born: Sheroma Hodge; 2 February 1985 (age 41)
- Beauty pageant titleholder
- Title: Miss British Virgin Islands 2010
- Hair color: Dark brown
- Eye color: Dark brown
- Major competitions: Miss Universe 2011 (Unplaced)

Sheroma "Brass.Angel" Hodge-Philip (born Sheroma Hodge, 2 February 1985) is a Virgin Islander model and beauty pageant titleholder who was crowned Miss British Virgin Islands 2010, the official representative of the British overseas territory to the 2011 Miss Universe pageant.

== Early life ==
Hodge attended British Virgin Islands High School from 1997 to 2002 and graduated from H. Lavity Stoutt Community College in 2004 with an associate's degree in natural sciences, where she collaborated in public relations and designing the college's website.

Hodge completed a bachelor's degree in media and communication, with a specialization in multimedia, at the University of the West Indies in Mona, Jamaica. She won the multimedia student award for her graduating class.

== Miss British Virgin Islands ==
Hodge, who stands 1.75 m (5 ft 9 in) tall, competed as one of 5 finalists in Miss British Virgin Islands 2010, held in Road Town on 1 August 2010, where she obtained six special awards including Best in Swimsuit, Best in Evening Wear, Best Intellect and Best Poise.

As the winner of the title, Hodge was crowned by outgoing titleholder Josefina Nunez, gaining the right to represent the British Virgin Islands in the 2011 Miss Universe pageant in São Paulo, Brazil.

Awards and achievements
Preceded by Josefina Nunez	Miss British Virgin Islands; 2010	Succeeded by Abigail Hyndman
