= Catherine Miller =

Trinidadian model and beauty pageant contestant (born 1991)

- Born: Catherine Miller; December 22, 1991 (age 34); Port of Spain, Trinidad and Tobago
- Height: 1.80 m (5 ft 11 in)
- Beauty pageant titleholder
- Title: Miss Trinidad and Tobago 2013
- Hair color: Black
- Major competitions: Miss Trinidad and Tobago 2013 (Winner); Miss Universe 2013 (2nd Runner-Up Best National Costume)

Catherine Miller (born December 22, 1991) is a Trinidadian model and beauty pageant titleholder who won Miss Trinidad and Tobago 2013 and represented her country at the Miss Universe 2013 pageant.

== Early life ==
Miller is recent graduate of the Savannah College of Art and Design where she obtained her Bachelor of Fine Arts in Creative Advertising.

== Pageantry ==
=== Miss Trinidad and Tobago 2013 ===
Miller was crowned as the new Miss Trinidad and Tobago in 2013 on September 21, 2013 and gained the right to represent Trinidad and Tobago at Miss Universe 2013. The pageant finale was held at One Woodbroke Place.

=== Miss Universe 2013 ===
Miller represented Trinidad and Tobago at the 62nd annual Miss Universe pageant and became 2nd runner-up in the Best in National Costume award. She was unplaced during the Coronation. Gabriela Isler of Venezuela won the said pageant.

Awards and achievements
Preceded by Avionne Mark	Miss Trinidad and Tobago; 2013	Succeeded by Jevon King
