= Project Runway season 19 =

Project Runway
- Season 19
- No. of tasks: 14
- No. of contestants: 16
- Winner: Shantall Lacayo

Release
- Original network: Bravo
- Original release: October 14, 2021 – February 3, 2022

Season chronology
- ← Previous; Season 18 Next → Season 20

The nineteenth season of Project Runway began Thursday, October 14, 2021. Sixteen designers competed to become "the next great American designer." Elle editor-in-chief Nina Garcia, fashion designer Brandon Maxwell, and former Teen Vogue editor-in-chief and journalist Elaine Welteroth returned as judges. Season 4 winner Christian Siriano returned to mentor the designers and use the "Siriano Save" to bring an eliminated designer back into the competition if he disagrees with the judges' verdict. Karlie Kloss did not return as host and head judge but appeared in the penultimate episode of the season as a guest judge.

The winner of the season was Shantall Lacayo from Miami, Florida. Lacayo marked the first time a contestant from an international spin-off participated and won in the original U.S. franchise, having previously competed and finished in third on the first season of Project Runway Latin America. This season brought in four women to the finale, with Chasity Sereal, Coral Castillo, and Kristina Kharlashkina finishing as runners-up.

Anna Yinan Zhou and Prajjé Oscar Jean-Baptiste competed later on season 20 with Anna placing 8th and Prajjé placing 5th out of 14.

== Designers ==
Contestant	Age	Hometown	Finish	Outcome
Caycee Black	40	Brooklyn, New York	Episode 1	16th place
Meg Ferguson	35	Tulsa, Oklahoma	Episode 2	15th place
Kenneth Barlis	32	San Diego, California	Episode 3	14th place
Darren Apolonio	27	Manhattan, New York	Episode 4	13th place
Sabrina Spanta	29	Bloomfield Hills, Michigan	Episode 5	12th place
Katie Kortman	40	Yokosuka, Japan	Episode 6	11th place
Octavio Aguilar	42	Miami, Florida	Episode 8	9th place
Zayden Skipper	32	Atlanta, Georgia	Episode 8	9th place
Prajjé Oscar Jean-Baptiste	37	Philadelphia, Pennsylvania	Episode 9	8th place
Anna Yinan Zhou	32	San Francisco, California	Episode 10	7th place
Aaron Michael	39	Jackson, Mississippi	Episode 11	6th place
Bones Jones	30	Harlem, New York	Episode 12	5th place
Chasity Sereal	31	Houston, Texas	Episode 14	Runners-up
Coral Castillo	40	Los Angeles, California	Episode 14	Runners-up
Kristina Kharlashkina	33	New York, New York	Episode 14	Runners-up
Shantall Lacayo*	37	Miami, Florida	Episode 14	Winner

^{*}Shantall Lacayo was a finalist on Project Runway Latin America season 1.

== Designer progress ==
Designer	Episodes														Eliminated Episode
Designer	1	2	3	4	5	6	7	8	9	10^{3}	11^{3}	12	13	14	Eliminated Episode
Shantall	IN	IN	IN	WIN	HIGH	IN	SAFE	IN	WIN	WIN	IN	WIN	ADV	WINNER	14 — Finale
Chasity	LOW	IN	WIN	IN	IN	IN	WIN	HIGH	LOW	LOW	WIN	LOW	ADV	RUNNER-UP	14 — Finale
Coral	IN	IN	IN	IN	IN	HIGH	HIGH	LOW	IN	IN	LOW	HIGH	ADV	RUNNER-UP	14 — Finale
Kristina	IN	HIGH	IN	HIGH	IN	WIN	LOW	WIN	HIGH	LOW	HIGH	LOW	ADV	RUNNER-UP	14 — Finale
Bones	WIN	IN	LOW	IN	HIGH	LOW	HIGH	IN	IN	IN	IN	OUT			12 - Model as Muse
Aaron	IN	HIGH	IN	IN	HIGH	IN	HIGH	HIGH	HIGH	HIGH	OUT				11 - Haute Hair
Anna	IN	IN	HIGH	IN	WIN	IN	LOW	IN	LOW	OUT					10 - The Housewives
Prajjé	IN	WIN	IN	HIGH	LOW	HIGH	HIGH	LOW	OUT						9 - The Last Straw
Octavio	HIGH	IN	HIGH	IN	LOW	HIGH	LOW	OUT							8 - Couch Couture
Zayden	IN	HIGH	LOW	IN	IN	LOW	HIGH	OUT							8 - Couch Couture
Katie	IN	LOW	IN^{2}	LOW	LOW	OUT									6 - Fashion is Back, Baby!
Sabrina	LOW	IN	IN	LOW	OUT										5 - Go for the Gold… Sequin
Darren	HIGH	LOW	IN	OUT											4 - Flower Power
Kenneth	IN	LOW	OUT												3 - If You Got It, Haunt It
Meg	IN	QUIT^{1}													2 - #STREETWEAR
Caycee	OUT														1 - A Colorful Return

^Note 1 Due to mental health reasons, Meg withdrew from the competition, sparing Darren, Katie, and Kenneth from possible elimination.

^Note 2 Although Katie was deemed safe, the judges let her know they loved her look.

^Note 3: Despite two designers being marked safe, every designer was given a critique.

The designer won Project Runway Season 19.
The designer advanced to the Finale.
The designer won the challenge.
The designer was in the top two.
The designer had one of the highest scores but did not win.
The designer had one of the lowest scores but was not eliminated.
The designer was in the bottom two.
The designer was eliminated from the competition.
The designer lost, but was saved from elimination by Christian Siriano using the "Siriano Save".
The designer withdrew from the competition.

== Model progress ==
Model	Episodes													
Model	1	2^{1}	3	4	5^{2}	6	7	8	9	10^{3}	11	12^{4}	13	14
DD	KK	KT	BJ	SL	-	OA	CC, ZS	CS	CC	-	BJ	-	SL	SL
Jessica	-	SS	PJ	KT	-	AM	-	AM	KT	-	CS	-	-	CS
Luz	AZ	SL	AZ	AM	-	PJ	AM, BJ	SL	AM	-	-	-	KT	CC
Sarah	PJ	AM	SL	CC	-	KK	-	KT	-	-	-	-	CS	KT
Mimi	DA	AZ	DA	AZ	-	AZ	CS, PJ	OA	BJ	-	-	-	CC	OUT
Cassandra	CC	CS	CC	KK	-	BJ	KT, SL	BJ	AZ	-	CC	-	OUT	
Yuen	KT	-	OA	DA	-	KT	-	AZ	SL	-	AM	-	OUT	SL
Dariana	MF	-	KT	BJ	-	CS	-	ZS	PJ	-	KT	-	OUT	CS
Roberta	KB	-	CS	ZS	-	CC	-	-	-	-	SL	-	OUT	
Grace	BJ	BJ	ZS	SS	-	SL	AZ, OA	CC	CS	-	OUT			CS
Rachel	SL	-	KB	PJ	-	ZS	-	PJ	OUT					
Angelique	ZS	KK	AM	CS	-	OUT								
Ivana	CB	-	SS	OA	-	OUT								
Marsha	OA	-	KK	OUT										SL
Briana	AM	-	OUT											
Rebecca	CS	-	OUT											
Rute	SS	-	OUT											

^1 Female, male, and non-binary models were used for this challenge.

^2 Different male and female models were used for this challenge.

^3 Women from the Real Housewives of Potomac, Orange County and New York City are the clients for this challenge.

^4 Coco Rocha was the only model for this challenge. There was no runway but instead a photo shoot.

- Aaron Michael - AM
- Anna Yinan Zhou - AZ
- Bones Jones - BJ
- Caycee Black - CB
- Chasity Sereal - CS
- Coral Castillo - CC
- Darren Apolonio - DA
- Katie Kortman - KK
- Kenneth Barlis - KB
- Kristina Kharlashkina - KT
- Meg Ferguson - MF
- Octavio Aguilar - OA
- Prajjé Oscar Jean-Baptiste - PJ
- Sabrina Spanta - SS
- Shantall Lacayo - SL
- Zayden Skipper - ZS

== Episodes ==
=== Episode 1: A Colorful Return ===
Original airdate: October 14, 2021

The season premiere begins at the iconic Lincoln Center where Christian Siriano, Nina Garcia, Elaine Welteroth, and Brandon Maxwell welcome a talented group of new designers eager to show the world their skills and creativity. In a Project Runway first, the designers will be split into two teams living and working separately to create mini-collections celebrating color. The competition comes to a head on the day of the runway show when they reunite hoping their team is victorious while someone from the losing team will be going home.

Teams	Assigned Designers
Warm Colors	Aaron, Bones, Coral, Darren, Kenneth, Octavio, Prajjé, Shantall
Cool Colors	Anna, Caycee, Chasity, Katie, Kristina, Meg, Sabrina, Zayden

- Judges: Nina Garcia, Elaine Welteroth, Brandon Maxwell
- Guest Judge: Jason Wu
- WINNER: Bones Jones
- ELIMINATED: Caycee Black

=== Episode 2: #STREETWEAR ===
Original airdate: October 21, 2021

In their first individual challenge, the designers take on streetwear – the most relevant and individualized style in fashion. Working with male, female, and nonbinary models, the competitors dig into their unique personal experiences and cultures to create breakout looks.

- Judges: Nina Garcia, Elaine Welteroth, Brandon Maxwell
- Guest Judge: Wisdom Kaye
- WINNER: Prajjé Oscar Jean-Baptiste
- WITHDREW: Meg Ferguson
  - After a verbal altercation with Kenneth and Prajjé about switching models with Kenneth, Meg withdrew from the competition due to the stress of the competition on her mental health. Because Meg had already gone home this episode, the judges decided not to eliminate anyone.

=== Episode 3: If You Got It, Haunt It ===
Original airdate: October 28, 2021

It’s Halloween and Christian has a few tricks up his stylish sleeve. The designers are sent to sleep in a haunted mansion to find inspiration for their challenge. If they can survive the night, they’ll have two days to create a hauntingly chic masquerade gown.

- Judges: Nina Garcia, Elaine Welteroth, Brandon Maxwell
- Guest Judge: Taraji P. Henson
- WINNER: Chasity Sereal
- ELIMINATED: Kenneth Barlis

=== Episode 4: Flower Power ===
Original airdate: November 4, 2021

For their fourth challenge, the designers show up to discover their work room has been “flower flashed”! Inspired by the colorful blooms, the designers must create their own unique floral print from scratch and turn it into a high-end runway look.

- Judges: Nina Garcia, Elaine Welteroth, Brandon Maxwell
- Guest Judge: Gigi Hadid
- WINNER: Shantall Lacayo
- ELIMINATED: Darren Apolonio

=== Episode 5: Go For the Gold...Sequin ===
Original airdate: November 11, 2021

Figure skating icons Tara Lipinski and Johnny Weir steal the spotlight for this celebrity client challenge. This charismatic duo known for their savage takes and outlandish fashion have come to Project Runway for one reason – they need looks for the upcoming 2022 Winter Olympics. The designers will compete in pairs and the winning looks will be worn by Tara and Johnny in front of a global audience live in primetime from the Olympics.

Tara’s Look	Johnny’s Look
Anna	Bones
Shantall	Aaron
Chasity	Zayden
Kristina	Coral
Katie	Octavio
Prajjé	Sabrina

- Judges: Nina Garcia, Elaine Welteroth, Brandon Maxwell
- Guest Judges: Tara Lipinski and Johnny Weir
- WINNER: Anna Yinan Zhou
- ELIMINATED: Sabrina Spanta

=== Episode 6: Fashion is Back, Baby! ===
Original airdate: November 18, 2021

For the first time ever, our designers will collaborate with some of New York City’s most talented accessory designers who – like our designers – are all working to revitalize the fashion industry. Purses! Shoes! Gloves! Jewelry! Oh my! Taking inspiration from one another’s work, each collaborating duo is challenged to create a coordinated one-of-a-kind look and new accessory.

- Judges: Nina Garcia, Elaine Welteroth, Brandon Maxwell
- Guest Judge: Steven Kolb
- WINNER: Kristina Kharlashkina
- ELIMINATED: Katie Kortman

=== Episode 7: Are You Fur Real? ===
Original airdate: December 2, 2021

It's the avant garde challenge! Working in pairs, the designers must create innovative avant garde looks highlighting one of the most trendy and complicated of materials, faux fur.

Designer Teams
Aaron and Bones
Anna and Octavio
Chasity and Prajjé
Coral and Zayden
Kristina and Shantall

- Judges: Nina Garcia, Elaine Welteroth
- Guest Judge: Billy Porter, Esteban Cortazar (Sitting in for Brandon Maxwell)
- WINNER: Chasity Sereal
- SIRIANO SAVE: Shantall Lacayo

=== Episode 8: Couch Couture ===
Original airdate: December 9, 2021

The designers are challenged to solve one of fashion's eternal struggles, if comfortable can really be chic; there's nothing comfortable about designing for a one day challenge with a surprise visit from Geoffrey Mac and Cyndi Lauper.

- Judges: Nina Garcia, Elaine Welteroth, Brandon Maxwell
- Guest Judge: Maria Cornejo
- WINNER: Kristina Kharlashkina
- ELIMINATED: Octavio Aguilar & Zayden Skipper

=== Episode 9: The Last Straw ===
Original airdate: December 16, 2021

The designers fall for an age-old prank when they’re invited out for cocktails by Christian Siriano only to discover that it’s actually challenge-time, not party-time. It’s time for the unconventional challenge where the designers will be asked to create an elegant cocktail dress from an actual cocktail bar.

- Judges: Nina Garcia, Elaine Welteroth, Brandon Maxwell
- Guest Judge: Christopher John Rogers
- WINNER: Shantall Lacayo
- ELIMINATED: Prajjé Oscar Jean-Baptiste

=== Episode 10: The Housewives ===
Original airdate: January 6, 2022

Bravo's Real Housewives of Potomac, Orange County and New York City bring their signature attitudes to the catwalk for a client challenge like no other; emotions run high as each designer is paired with a Housewife to make them a reunion show look.

- Judges: Nina Garcia, Elaine Welteroth, Brandon Maxwell
- Guest Judge: Andy Cohen
- WINNER: Shantall Lacayo
- ELIMINATED: Anna Yinan Zhou

=== Episode 11: Haute Hair ===
Original airdate: January 13, 2022

It’s time for a twist… a hair twist, that is! In this one day challenge, the designers are each teamed with an up-and-coming hairstylist for a head-to-toe fashion collaboration. The pairs will work together to create an innovative design and hair look that complement each other that showcases their creativity to the judges.

- Judges: Nina Garcia, Elaine Welteroth, Brandon Maxwell
- Guest Judge: Precious Lee
- WINNER: Chasity Sereal
- ELIMINATED: Aaron Michael

=== Episode 12: The Model as Muse ===
Original airdate: January 20, 2022

For the first time ever in Project Runway history, the designers will be creating looks for the same Supermodel in this one-of-a-kind challenge. They must create editorial looks specifically inspired by internationally renowned model, Coco Rocha. And shockingly, there’s no runway! The final five are tasked to show artistic range by delivering a perfect look and a perfect photograph to show it off.

- Judges: Nina Garcia, Elaine Welteroth, Brandon Maxwell
- Guest Judge: Coco Rocha
- WINNER: Shantall Lacayo
- ELIMINATED: Bones Jones

=== Episode 13: The Sky is the Limit ===
Original airdate: January 27, 2022

Four designers compete for only three spots in the Season 19 finale. For the last challenge, the designers will need to show the judges their brand and vision for the future of fashion in a single look. It’s no small task as these finalists put everything they’ve got into this runway show to convince Brandon, Elaine, Nina and guest judge Karlie Kloss that they deserve the opportunity to make a collection for New York Fashion Week.

- Judges: Nina Garcia, Elaine Welteroth, Brandon Maxwell
- Guest Judge: Karlie Kloss
- ADVANCED: Chasity Sereal, Coral Castillo, Kristina Kharlashkina, Shantall Lacayo

=== Episode 14: Finale ===
Original airdate: February 3, 2022

A winner for Season 19 is chosen at the iconic New York Fashion Week.

- Judges: Nina Garcia, Elaine Welteroth, Brandon Maxwell
- Guest Judge: Tommy Hilfiger
- WINNER OF PROJECT RUNWAY: Shantall Lacayo
- RUNNER-UPS: Kristina Kharlashkina, Chasity Sereal, Coral Castillo
