= Project Runway season 20 =

Project Runway
- Season 20
- No. of tasks: 13
- No. of contestants: 14
- Winner: Bishme Cromartie

Release
- Original network: Bravo
- Original release: June 15 – September 7, 2023

Season chronology
- ← Previous; Season 19 Next → Season 21

The twentieth season of Project Runway was announced to air with a two-part premiere on Bravo on June 15, 2023. To mark the milestone, the show brought back 14 past designers for an All-Stars competition, replacing the retired spin-off after its production company, The Weinstein Company, went bankrupt. This was the last season to air on Bravo after three seasons, before it was picked up by Disney to be aired on Freeform, Disney+, and Hulu.

Editor-in-chief of Elle, Nina Garcia, fashion designer Brandon Maxwell, and journalist Elaine Welteroth all returned as judges, and season 4 winner Christian Siriano returned as mentor on the show. They were joined by guest judges on the panel each week, including: Billy Porter, Law Roach, Julia Fox, former judge Zac Posen, and Council of Fashion Designers of America CEO Steven Kolb. Fashion designers Sergio Hudson and Willy Chavarria filled in for Garcia in two episodes. The season did not feature a host; all on-air duties were fulfilled by Siriano and the judges.

The winner was Bishme Cromartie, who returned after previously competing on season 17, and received a cash prize of $250,000, a mentorship with the Council of Fashion Designers of America, and a spread in Elle magazine. Brittany Allen and Laurence Basse, from seasons 18 and 15 respectively, finished as runners-up.

== Contestants ==
Contestant	Age	Hometown	Original season(s)	Original placement(s)	Finish	Outcome
Nora Pagel	39	Metuchen, New Jersey	Season 1	8th place	Episode 2	14th place
Mila Hermanovski	54	Los Angeles, California	Season 7	3rd place	Episode 3	13th place
Mila Hermanovski	54	Los Angeles, California	All Stars 1	6th place	Episode 3	13th place
Viktor Luna	41	Los Angeles, California	Season 9	3rd place	Episode 4	12th place
Viktor Luna	41	Los Angeles, California	All Stars 3	5th place	Episode 4	12th place
Hester Sunshine	38	New York City, New York	Season 17	Runner-up	Episode 5	11th place
Kayne Gillaspie	44	Nashville, Tennessee	Season 3	5th place	Episode 6	10th place
Kayne Gillaspie	44	Nashville, Tennessee	All Stars 2	9th place	Episode 6	10th place
Fabio Costa	39	Belo Horizonte, Brazil	Season 10	Runner-up	Episode 7	9th place
Fabio Costa	39	Belo Horizonte, Brazil	All Stars 4	5th place	Episode 7	9th place
Fabio Costa	39	Belo Horizonte, Brazil	All Stars 6	Runner-up	Episode 7	9th place
Anna Yinan Zhou	33	San Francisco, California	Season 19	7th place	Episode 9	8th place
Kara Saun	54	Los Angeles, California	Season 1	Runner-up	Episode 10	7th place
Korto Momolu	47	Little Rock, Arkansas	Season 5	Runner-up	Episode 11	6th place
Korto Momolu	47	Little Rock, Arkansas	All Stars 3	Runner-up	Episode 11	6th place
Prajjé Oscar Jean-Baptiste	38	Philadelphia, Pennsylvania	Season 19	8th place	Episode 12	5th place
Rami Kashou	46	New York City, New York	Season 4	Runner-up	Episode 13	4th place
Rami Kashou	46	New York City, New York	All Stars 1	8th place	Episode 13	4th place
Brittany Allen	32	Austin, Texas	Season 18	5th place	Episode 14	Runners-up
Laurence Basse	47	Los Angeles, California	Season 15	3rd place	Episode 14	Runners-up
Bishme Cromartie	32	Los Angeles, California	Season 17	4th place	Episode 14	Winner

== Designer progress ==
Designer	Episodes												
Designer	2	3	4	5	6	7	8	9	10	11	12	13	14
Bishme	HIGH	IN	IN	IN	HIGH	IN	HIGH	WIN	WIN	LOW	HIGH	WIN	WINNER
Brittany	IN	HIGH	LOW	WIN	LOW	IN	IN	HIGH	IN	HIGH	HIGH	LOW	RUNNER-UP
Laurence	IN	LOW	HIGH	IN	WIN	LOW	WIN	IN	HIGH	WIN	LOW	HIGH	RUNNER-UP
Rami	IN	LOW	IN	LOW	IN	HIGH	SAVE	HIGH	HIGH	HIGH	WIN	OUT	
Prajjé	IN	HIGH	HIGH	IN	HIGH	HIGH	LOW	LOW	LOW	LOW	OUT		
Korto	IN	IN	WIN	IN	IN	LOW	HIGH	IN	IN	OUT			
Kara	LOW	IN	HIGH	HIGH	IN	WIN	IN	LOW	OUT				
Anna	IN	IN	LOW	HIGH	IN	IN	LOW	OUT					
Fabio	HIGH	IN	IN	LOW	LOW	OUT							
Kayne	WIN	HIGH	LOW	IN	OUT								
Hester	IN	IN	IN	OUT									
Viktor	LOW	WIN	OUT										
Mila	IN	OUT											
Nora	OUT												

Designer won Project Runway Season 20.
Designer won the challenge.
Designer was in the top two.
Designer had one of the highest scores but did not win.
Designer was safe and advanced to the next round.
Designer had one of the lowest scores but was not eliminated.
Designer was in the bottom two.
Designer was eliminated from the competition.
Designer was saved from elimination using the "Siriano Save."

== Model progress ==
Model	Episodes												
Model	2	3	4	5	6	7	8	9	10	11	12	13	14
Jessica M	LB	PB	KM/PB	KS	KS	RK	-	-	BC	LB	-	BC	BC
Mimi	FC	LB	HS/FC	BA	LB	BC	BC	-	RK	PB	-	LB	BA
Roberta	RK	VL	KS/LB	KM	PB	-	AZ	-	KM	-	-	-	LB
Luz	PB	KM	-	PB	RK	BA	KM	-	PB	BA	-	RK	OUT
Shanae	AZ	-	-	AZ	BC	KS	RK	-	KS	BC	-	BA	OUT
Ren	-	BA	VL/KG	KG	FC	-	LB	-	BA	KM	-	OUT	
Emilee	NP	AZ	-	-	KM	-	PB	-	-	RK	-	OUT	
Jessica Z	VL	-	-	-	-	-	-	-	LB	OUT			
Liris	KS	RK	-	-	KG	-	KS	-	OUT				
DD	KM	MH	-	HS	AZ	KM	BA	-	OUT				
Mariel	BA	HS	-	RK	BA	-	OUT						
Elise	KG	FC	BA/AZ	BC	OUT								
Sarah	MH	KG	RK/BC	LB	OUT								
Anastasiia	HS	BC	-	FC	OUT								
Naimah	BC	KS	-	OUT									

- Anna Yinan Zhou - AZ
- Bishme Cromartie - BC
- Brittany Allen - BA
- Fabio Costa - FC
- Hester Sunshine - HS
- Kayne Gillaspie - KG
- Kara Saun - KS
- Korto Momolu - KM
- Laurence Basse - LB
- Mila Hermanovski - MH
- Nora Pagel - NP
- Prajjé Oscar Jean Baptiste - PB
- Rami Kashou - RK
- Viktor Luna - VL

== Guest judges ==
Guest judges this season included, in chronological order;

- Alicia Silverstone, actress
- Stacey Bendet, "Alice + Olivia" CEO & founder
- Wes Gordon, Carolina Herrera creative director
- Lena Waithe, actor
- Jennie Garth, actress
- Sergio Hudson, designer
- Paulina Porizkova, model
- Willy Chavarria, designer
- Julia Fox, actress
- Kate Chastain, from Below Deck
- Luann de Lesseps, from The Real Housewives of New York City
- Batsheva Hay, designer
- Coleman Domingo, Emmy-winning actor
- Law Roach, image architect
- Steven Kolb, Council of Fashion Designers of America CEO
- Zac Posen, fashion designer
- Billy Porter, actor

== Episodes ==
=== Episode 1: Meet the All-Stars ===
Original airdate: June 14, 2023

- Judges: Nina Garcia, Elaine Welteroth, Brandon Maxwell

=== Episode 2: Project Redemption ===
Original airdate: June 15, 2023

- Judges: Nina Garcia, Elaine Welteroth, Brandon Maxwell
- Guest Judge: Alicia Silverstone
- WINNER: Kayne Gillaspie
- ELIMINATED: Nora Pagel

=== Episode 3: Toying With Fashion ===
Original airdate: June 22, 2023

- Judges: Nina Garcia, Elaine Welteroth, Brandon Maxwell
- Guest Judge: Stacey Bendet
- WINNER: Viktor Luna
- ELIMINATED: Mila Hermanovski

=== Episode 4: Coronation Day ===
Original airdate: June 29, 2023

Teams
Kayne & Viktor
Brittany & Anna
Hester & Fabio
Kara & Laurence
Prajje & Korto
Rami & Bishme

- Judges: Nina Garcia, Elaine Welteroth, Brandon Maxwell
- Guest Judge: Wes Gordon
- WINNER: Korto Momolu
- ELIMINATED: Viktor Luna

=== Episode 5: Seeing Red ===
Original airdate: July 6, 2023

- Judges: Nina Garcia, Elaine Welteroth, Brandon Maxwell
- Guest Judge: Lena Waithe
- WINNER: Brittany Allen
- ELIMINATED: Hester Sunshine

=== Episode 6: Like Totally '90s ===
Original airdate: July 13, 2023

Team Blue	Team Red
Laurence, Bishme, Prajje, Korto, and Rami	Kayne, Brittany, Fabio, Kara, and Anna

- Judges: Nina Garcia, Elaine Welteroth, Brandon Maxwell
- Guest Judge: Jennie Garth
- WINNER: Laurence Basse
- ELIMINATED: Kayne Gillaspie

=== Episode 7: Fashion, Inside Out ===
Original airdate: July 20, 2023

- Judges: Elaine Welteroth, Brandon Maxwell
- Guest Judge: Sergio Hudson (sitting in for Nina Garcia) & Paulina Porizkova
- WINNER: Kara Saun
- ELIMINATED: Fabio Costa

=== Episode 8: Uncut Hems ===
Original airdate: July 27, 2023

Kara Saun vs. Anna	Brittany vs. Laurence	Rami vs. Korto	Bishme vs. Prajje

- Judges: Elaine Welteroth, Brandon Maxwell
- Guest Judge: Willy Chavarria (sitting in for Nina Garcia) & Julia Fox
- WINNER: Laurence Basse
- Saved: Rami Kashou

=== Episode 9: Below Decked Out ===
Original airdate: August 3, 2023

- Judges: Nina Garcia, Elaine Welteroth, Brandon Maxwell
- Guest Judge: Kate Chastain & Luann de Lesseps
- WINNER: Bishme Cromartie
- ELIMINATED: Anna Yinan Zhou

=== Episode 10: Freedom ===
Original airdate: August 10, 2023

- Judges: Nina Garcia, Elaine Welteroth, Brandon Maxwell
- WINNER: Bishme Cromartie
- ELIMINATED: Kara Saun

=== Episode 11: Double Bind ===
Original airdate: August 17, 2023

- Judges: Nina Garcia, Elaine Welteroth, Brandon Maxwell
- Guest Judge: Batsheva Hay
- WINNER: Laurence Basse
- ELIMINATED: Korto Momolu

=== Episode 12: Let Me See Your Peacock ===
Original airdate: August 24, 2023

- Judges: Nina Garcia, Elaine Welteroth, Brandon Maxwell
- Guest Judge: Colman Domingo
- WINNER: Rami Kashou
- ELIMINATED: Prajjé Oscar Jean Baptiste

=== Episode 13: The Sky's the Limit ===
Original airdate: August 31, 2023

Avant-garde looks inspired by the SUMMIT One Vanderbilt observation deck / interactive art installation by Kenzo Digital.

- Judges: Nina Garcia, Elaine Welteroth, Brandon Maxwell
- Guest Judge: Steven Kolb & Law Roach
- WINNER: Bishme Cromartie
- ELIMINATED: Rami Kashou

=== Episode 14: The Finale ===
Original airdate: September 7, 2023

- Judges: Nina Garcia, Elaine Welteroth
- Guest Judge: Zac Posen (sitting in for Brandon Maxwell), Billy Porter
- WINNER OF PROJECT RUNWAY: Bishme Cromartie
- Runners Up: Laurence Basse, Brittany Allen
