= Project Runway season 18 =

Project Runway
- Season 18
- No. of tasks: 14
- No. of contestants: 16
- Winner: Geoffrey Mac

Release
- Original network: Bravo
- Original release: December 5, 2019 – March 12, 2020

Season chronology
- ← Previous; Season 17 Next → Season 19

Project Runway Season 18 began Thursday, December 5, 2019. Sixteen designers compete to become "the next great American designer." Returning as judges are supermodel Karlie Kloss, editor-in-chief of Elle, Nina Garcia, fashion designer Brandon Maxwell, and former editor-in-chief of Teen Vogue Elaine Welteroth. Season 4 winner Christian Siriano returns to mentor the designers and use the "Siriano save" for the first time to bring an eliminated designer back into the competition if he disagrees with the judge’s verdict. A "save" was also used by Tim Gunn beginning in Season 12 and continuing for the remainder of his time with the show.

== Contestants ==
Contestant	Age	Hometown	Finish	Outcome
Jenn Charkow	41	Seattle, Washington	Episode 1	16-15
Asma Bibi	30	Philadelphia, Pennsylvania	Episode 1	16-15
Veronica Sheaffer	40	Chicago, Illinois	Episode 2	14
Alan Gonzalez	24	Houston, Texas	Episode 3	13
Tyler Neasloney	29	Jersey City, New Jersey	Episode 4	12
Melanie Trygg	28	Orcas Island, Washington	Episode 5	11
Shavi Lewis	33	Newark, New Jersey	Episode 6	10
Dayoung Kim	37	Portland, Oregon	Episode 8	9 (quit)
Chelsey Carter	30	Chicago, Illinois	Episode 8	8
Delvin McCray	26	Chicago, Illinois	Episode 10	7
Brittany Allen	29	Fort Smith, Arkansas	Episode 12	6-5
Marquise Foster	30	Brooklyn, New York	Episode 12	6-5
Victoria Cocieru	27	Chișinău, Moldova	Episode 14	4-2
Sergio Guadarrama	36	New York, New York	Episode 14	4-2
Nancy Volpe-Beringer	64	Philadelphia, Pennsylvania	Episode 14	4-2
Geoffrey Mac	42	Brooklyn, New York	Episode 14	1

== Designer progress ==
Designer	Episodes														Eliminated episode
Designer	1 ^{1}	2	3	4	5	6	7	8	9 ^{3}	10	11 ^{4}	12 ^{4}	13	14	Eliminated episode
Geoffrey	HIGH	LOW	IN	IN	WIN	IN	IN	LOW	HIGH	WIN	LOW	ADV	ADV	WINNER	14 — Finale, Part 2
Nancy	IN	IN	IN	HIGH	IN	IN	LOW	HIGH	LOW	HIGH	WIN	ADV	ADV	RUNNER-UP	14 — Finale, Part 2
Sergio	HIGH	IN	WIN	IN	LOW	LOW	IN	WIN	HIGH	HIGH	LOW	ADV	ADV	RUNNER-UP	14 — Finale, Part 2
Victoria	IN	HIGH	HIGH	WIN	HIGH	HIGH	LOW	LOW	HIGH	LOW	HIGH	ADV	ADV	RUNNER-UP	14 — Finale, Part 2
Marquise	IN	WIN	IN	LOW	LOW	IN	OUT	HIGH	WIN	IN	LOW	OUT			12 - The Height of Avant Garde Fashion
Brittany	WIN	IN	LOW	IN	HIGH	IN	WIN	IN	SAFE	IN	LOW	OUT			12 - The Height of Avant Garde Fashion
Delvin	IN	HIGH	IN	IN	IN	LOW	HIGH	IN	LOW	OUT					10 - Live and Let Tie Dye
Chelsey	IN	IN	IN	HIGH	IN	WIN	IN	OUT							8 - Sheer Genius
Dayoung	LOW	IN	IN	IN	IN	HIGH	HIGH	WD^{2}							8 - Sheer Genius
Shavi	IN	IN	HIGH	LOW	IN	OUT									6 - There is Only One You
Melanie	HIGH	IN	IN	IN	OUT										5 - She's Sew Unusual
Tyler	IN	LOW	LOW	OUT											4 - The Ultimate Upcycle
Alan	LOW	IN	OUT												3 - Sleigh the Runway
Veronica	IN	OUT													2 - Cats Of The Urban Jungle
Asma	OUT														1 - Blast Off
Jenn	OUT														1 - Blast Off

^1 Asma and Jenn, the losing pair, were eliminated, as the judges had a hard time deciding who should have been out.

^2 Due to health issues, Dayoung withdrew from the competition, sparing Marquise from his elimination.

^3 Christian Siriano decided to save Brittany from elimination, using the Siriano Save.

^4 On Episode 11, No one was eliminated as the judges felt that everyone did a good job. Because of the non-elimination, it was revealed that Episode 12 would be a Double Elimination round.

The designer won Project Runway Season 18.
The designer advanced to the Finale.
The designer won the challenge.
The designer was in the top two.
The designer had one of the highest scores but did not win.
The designer had one of the lowest scores but was not eliminated.
The designer was in the bottom two.
The designer was eliminated from the competition.
The designer lost, but was saved from elimination by Christian Siriano using the "Siriano Save".
The designer withdrew due to health reasons.

== Model progress ==
Model	Episodes													
Model	1	2	3	4	5	6	7	8	9	10	11	12	13	14
Thijin	JC	CC	BA	-	BA	CC	DK	GM	VC	SG	-	GM	GM	GM
DD	TN	NB	DM	-	CC	MF	NB	NB	NB	VC	-	NB	NB	NB
Yuen	DM	DM	SG	-	MF	DK	GM	DM	-	MF	-	SG	SG	SG
Madeline	AB	DK	GM	-	SG	NB	CC	-	-	-	-	VC	VC	VC
Severine	NB	SL	MT	-	DM	BA	SG	BA	SG	NB	-	BA	SG	OUT
Nora	VS	TN	NB	-	SL	SL	VC	SG	-	BA	-	MF	OUT	
Asia	MT	AG	TN	-	MT	DM	DM	VC	-	DM	-	OUT		
Jessica	BA	BA	DK	-	NB	VC	BA	CC	-	GM	-	OUT		
Stephanie	VC	SG	SL	-	DK	SG	MF	MF	DM	OUT				
Garnet	-	MF	AG	-	GM	GM	OUT							
Christina	MF	VC	VC	-	VC	OUT								
Audrey	GM	VS	MF	-	OUT									
Malia	SG	MT	CC	-	OUT									
Jasmine	CC	GM	OUT											
Emmy	AG	OUT												
Meandra	DK	OUT												
Priscilla	SL	OUT												

- Alan Gonzalez - AG
- Asma Bibi - AB
- Brittany Allen - BA
- Chelsey Carter - CC
- Dayoung Kim - DK
- Delvin McCray - DM
- Geoffrey Mac - GM
- Jenn Charkow - JC
- Marquise Foster - MF
- Melanie Trygg - MT
- Nancy Volpe-Berringer - NB
- Sergio Guadarrama - SG
- Shavi Lewis - SL
- Tyler Neasloney - TN
- Veronica Sheaffer - VS
- Victoria Cocieru - VC

== Episodes ==
=== Episode 1: Blast Off ===
Original airdate: December 5, 2019

With luggage still in tow, the designers are greeted at the TWA Hotel at John F. Kennedy International Airport ready to take flight with their first challenge: to create an innovative look inspired by humanity's continued push into space exploration. The designers must pair up and collaborate to make two cohesive pieces—a jumpsuit and a cocktail look—that blow away the judges.

Jumpsuit	Cocktail Look
Brittany	Sergio
Chelsey	Shavi
Geoffrey	Melanie
Jenn	Asma
Veronica	Victoria
Marquise	Nancy
Dayoung	Alan
Delvin	Tyler

- Judges: Karlie Kloss, Nina Garcia, Elaine Welteroth, Brandon Maxwell
- WINNER: Brittany Allen
- ELIMINATED: Jenn Charkow & Asma Bibi

=== Episode 2: Cats of the Urban Jungle ===
Original airdate: December 12, 2019

Designers must create a fresh take on a timeless classic: animal prints;. Taking inspiration from the movie Cats, the designers must tame their prints to create cool street-style looks that compete on the runway and in the Flash Sale challenge.

- Judges: Karlie Kloss, Nina Garcia, Elaine Welteroth, Brandon Maxwell
- Guest Judge: Marni Senofonte
- WINNER: Marquise Foster
- ELIMINATED: Veronica Sheaffer

=== Episode 3: Sleigh the Runway ===
Original airdate: December 19, 2019

The designers are awakened by a surprise visitor and are challenged to show their holiday spirit in the perfect party dress. They are given two days to create the look using holiday-themed unconventional materials.

- Judges: Karlie Kloss, Nina Garcia, Elaine Welteroth, Brandon Maxwell
- Guest Judge: Kiernan Shipka
- WINNER: Sergio Guadarrama
- ELIMINATED: Alan Gonzalez

=== Episode 4: The Ultimate Upcycle ===
Original airdate: January 2, 2020

Guest mentor and celebrity stylist Karla Welch tasks the designers with dressing Karlie Kloss, her client. The designers must use donated clothing from a Goodwill store to create their looks for this one-day challenge.

- Judges: Karlie Kloss, Nina Garcia, Elaine Welteroth, Brandon Maxwell
- Guest Judge: Laverne Cox
- WINNER: Victoria Cocieru
- ELIMINATED: Tyler Neasloney

=== Episode 5: She's Sew Unusual ===
Original airdate: January 9, 2020

Singer Cyndi Lauper inspires and guest judges this team challenge. The designers must create cohesive mini-collections paying homage to Lauper's 1980s fashion style while still giving the looks a modern take—but Christian throws out a mid-challenge twist that changes everything.

Teams	Assigned Designers
Team Chaos	Brittany, Dayoung, Delvin, Geoffrey, Nancy, Victoria
Team Stripes	Chelsey, Marquise, Melanie, Sergio, Shavi

- Judges: Karlie Kloss, Nina Garcia, Elaine Welteroth, Brandon Maxwell
- Guest Judge: Cyndi Lauper
- Winning team: Team Chaos
- WINNER: Geoffrey Mac
- ELIMINATED: Melanie Trygg

=== Episode 6: There Is Only One You ===
Original airdate: January 16, 2020

The designers are given a chance to think about their family history and channel those stories and emotions into a look of their choosing. The stakes are high in this one-day, Flash Sale challenge.

- Judges: Karlie Kloss, Nina Garcia, Elaine Welteroth, Brandon Maxwell
- Guest Judge: Fernando Garcia
- WINNER: Chelsey Carter
- ELIMINATED: Shavi Lewis

=== Episode 7: Project Runway X Ashley Longshore ===
Original airdate: January 23, 2020

The designers are challenged to collaborate with the fashion industry's latest art darling, Ashley Longshore. Using her pop art prints for their garments, the designers must create bold looks that celebrate these one-of-a-kind prints.

- Judges: Karlie Kloss, Nina Garcia, Elaine Welteroth, Brandon Maxwell
- Guest Judge: Ashley Longshore
- WINNER: Brittany Allen
- ELIMINATED: Marquise Foster

=== Episode 8: Sheer Genius ===
Original airdate: January 30, 2020

The designers are faced with their hardest challenge yet: a one-day challenge using difficult-to-use sexy, sheer fabrics to create editorial looks.

Note: Dayoung Kim withdrew for health reasons. (Note: She was later diagnosed with dysautonomia, “a condition that exhibits difficult-to-pinpoint symptoms like digestive problems and chronic fatigue and had gone undetected for about five years.”) Most recently eliminated designer Marquise Foster returned to the competition.

- Judges: Karlie Kloss, Nina Garcia, Elaine Welteroth, Brandon Maxwell
- Guest Judge: Paloma Elsesser
- WINNER: Sergio Guadarrama
- ELIMINATED: Chelsey Carter
- WITHDREW: Dayoung Kim

=== Episode 9: Suit Yourself ===
Original airdate: February 6, 2020

The challenge is all about turning the tuxedo on its head; inspired by Christian Siriano's Oscar look for actor Billy Porter, the designers must find a way to take the tuxedo into the future with a mix of male, female and non-binary models. A perfectly tailored suit is nearly impossible without help, so the designers get a surprise second set of hands to help out.

- Judges: Karlie Kloss, Nina Garcia, Elaine Welteroth, Brandon Maxwell
- Guest Judge: Thom Browne
- WINNER: Marquise Foster
- SIRIANO SAVE: Brittany Allen

=== Episode 10: Live and Let Tie Dye ===
Original airdate: February 13, 2020

Tie dye is back in a big way, and the designers will need to create their own textiles to elevate the trend from casual to couture. In a twist that may feel more like a trick to the designers, it's an overnight challenge.

- Judges: Karlie Kloss, Nina Garcia, Elaine Welteroth, Brandon Maxwell
- Guest Judge: Leslie Jones
- WINNER: Geoffrey Mac
- ELIMINATED: Delvin McCray

=== Episode 11: Olympic Game Plan ===
Original airdate: February 20, 2020

The designers are paired up with athletes who will be competing to be in the 2020 Summer Olympic and Paralympic games. The designers need to make them their dream outfit for a victory night celebration, using all of their specialty skills to make the perfect proportions for their client's unique bodies, all while keeping their own point of view during a tough client challenge.

- Judges: Karlie Kloss, Nina Garcia, Elaine Welteroth, Brandon Maxwell
- Guest Judge: Lindsey Vonn
- WINNER: Nancy Volpe-Beringer
- ELIMINATED: None

=== Episode 12: The Height of Avant Garde Fashion ===
Original airdate: February 27, 2020

With only one challenge left to make it to New York Fashion Week, the remaining designers must think big to create an avant-garde look that is anything but ordinary. In a fashion first, the runway begins with a season long retrospective, outside and 16 stories high, at New York City’s dramatic Vessel. The stakes are as high as the runway, because in fashion one day you’re in, and in this challenge, two will be out.

- Judges: Karlie Kloss, Nina Garcia, Elaine Welteroth, Brandon Maxwell
- Guest Judge: Rachel Brosnahan
- ELIMINATED: Brittany Allen & Marquise Foster

=== Episode 13: Finale Part 1 ===
Original airdate: March 5, 2020

Christian visits the remaining contestants at home as they furiously complete their final collections. Then it's back to workroom to refine and revise, because even though New York Fashion Week is here, that doesn't mean everyone will show in the finale.

Note: The episode ends with a cliffhanger, the next episode will announce who will officially go through to the New York Fashion Week.

- Judges: Karlie Kloss, Nina Garcia, Elaine Welteroth, Brandon Maxwell
- Guest Judge: Steven Kolb
- ELIMINATED: None (announced in Episode 14)

=== Episode 14: Finale Part 2 ===
Original airdate: March 12, 2020

The remaining designers rush to put the final touches on their collections, balancing advice from experts while trying to not lose their own point of view. It’s game, set, match when Serena Williams joins as guest judge for the final runway, with only one designer chosen as the winner.

- Judges: Karlie Kloss, Nina Garcia, Elaine Welteroth, Brandon Maxwell
- Guest Judge: Serena Williams
- WINNER of Project Runway: Geoffrey Mac
- ELIMINATED: Nancy Volpe-Beringer & Sergio Guadarrama & Victoria Cocieru
