= Project Runway season 17 =

Project Runway
- Season 17
- No. of tasks: 14
- No. of contestants: 16
- Winner: Sebastian Grey

Release
- Original network: Bravo
- Original release: March 14 – June 13, 2019

Season chronology
- ← Previous; Season 16 Next → Season 18

Project Runway Season 17 is the seventeenth season of the television show Project Runway, returning to Bravo for the first time since season 5. The season began on Thursday, March 14, 2019. Sixteen designers compete to become "the next great American designer." This was the first season to feature: Karlie Kloss taking over for Heidi Klum, Brandon Maxwell as Zac Posen's replacement, additional judge and former editor-in-chief of Teen Vogue, Elaine Welteroth, as well as returning judge and editor-in-chief of Elle, Nina Garcia. In addition, season 4 winner Christian Siriano replaced Tim Gunn's role as mentor throughout the competition.

In 2023, Hester Sunshine and Bishme Cromartie returned to compete on season 20 with Hester placing 11th out of 14 and Bishme winning the competition.

== Contestants ==
Contestant	Age	Hometown	Finish	Outcome
Cavanagh Baker	26	Nashville, Tennessee	Episode 1	16th place
Frankie Lewis	30	Louisville, Kentucky	Episode 2	15th place
Nadine Ralliford	47	Stone Mountain, Georgia	Episode 3	14th place
Afa Ah Loo †	32	Orem, Utah	Episode 4	13th place
Kovid Kapoor	29	Brooklyn, New York	Episode 5	12th place
Rakan Shams Aldeen	30	Chicago, Illinois	Episode 6	11th place
Sonia Kasparian	55	Portland, Oregon	Episode 7	10th place
Renee Hill	51	Philadelphia, Pennsylvania	Episode 8	9th place
Lela Orr	29	Monroe, Louisiana	Episode 9	8th place
Venny Etienne	31	Dallas, Texas	Episode 10	7th place
Jamall Osterholm	23	Providence, Rhode Island	Episode 11	6th place
Tessa Clark	27	Cincinnati, Ohio	Episode 12	5th place
Bishme Cromartie	27	Baltimore, Maryland	Episode 13	4th place
Gary "Garo Sparo" Spampinato	45	New York, New York	Episode 14	3rd place
Hester Sunshine	34	Santa Fe, New Mexico	Episode 14	Runner-up
Sebastian Grey	31	Cali, Colombia	Episode 14	Winner

== Designer progress ==
Designer	Episodes														Eliminated episode
Designer	1	2	3	4	5	6	7	8	9 ^{1}	10 ^{2}	11	12	13 ^{3}	14	Eliminated episode
Sebastian	IN	WIN	HIGH	IN	IN	IN	IN	IN	IN	HIGH	WIN	HIGH	ADV	WINNER	14 - Finale, Part 2
Hester	IN	IN	WIN	HIGH	IN	WIN	LOW	WIN	IN	IN	LOW	LOW	ADV	RUNNER-UP	14 - Finale, Part 2
Garo	IN	IN	LOW	IN	HIGH	HIGH	IN	HIGH	WIN	LOW	HIGH	WIN	ADV	3RD PLACE	14 - Finale, Part 2
Bishme	IN	IN	IN	IN	WIN	IN	LOW	HIGH	HIGH	WIN	HIGH	HIGH	OUT		13 - One Elle of a Day
Tessa	WIN	HIGH	IN	IN	IN	HIGH	IN	IN	LOW	IN	LOW	OUT			12 - The Art of Fashion
Jamall	IN	IN	IN	IN	LOW	LOW	WIN	LOW	HIGH	HIGH	OUT				11 - New York City of Dreams
Venny	HIGH	IN	IN	IN	HIGH	LOW	HIGH	LOW	LOW	OUT					10 - What Do You Care About?
Lela	LOW	IN	IN	IN	IN	IN	HIGH	IN	OUT						9 - The Stitch is Back
Renee	HIGH	LOW	IN	WIN	IN	IN	IN	OUT							8 - Blame It on Rio
Sonia	IN	IN	IN	LOW	IN	IN	OUT								7 - Elegance is the New Black
Rakan	IN	IN	LOW	HIGH	LOW	OUT									6 - Power Play
Kovid	IN	LOW	HIGH	LOW	OUT										5 - High Fashion to High Street
Afa	IN	HIGH	IN	OUT											4 - Survive in Style
Nadine	IN	IN	OUT												3 - All the Rage
Frankie	LOW	OUT													2 - The Future is Here
Cavanagh	OUT														1 - First Impressions

^1: From episode 9 onward, challenge winners no longer received immunity.
^2: Despite two designers being marked safe, every designer was given a critique.
^3: In episode 13, it was revealed that instead of four designers, only three of the designers will be able to show their collection at the Finale.

The designer won Project Runway Season 17.
The designer advanced to the Finale.
The designer won the challenge.
The designer came in second but did not win the challenge.
The designer had one of the highest scores for that challenge, but did not win.
The designer had one of the lowest scores for that challenge, but was not eliminated.
The designer was in the bottom two, but was not eliminated.
The designer lost and was eliminated from the competition.

== Model progress ==
Model	Episodes													
Model	1	2	3	4	5	6	7	8	9 ^{1}	10	11 ^{2}	12	13	14
Nora	RH	NR	KK	RH	RH	RH	RH	GS	-	VE	-	TC	-	SG
Thijin	JO	GS	SK	KK	HS	HS	VE	HS	-	BC	-	HS	GS	HS
Sarah	GS	VE	RA	SG	TC	TC	HS	BC	-	HS	-	GS	GS	GS
Mimi	KK	BC	JO	AL	GS	GS	SG	SG	-	JO	-	SG	-	-
Aviana	HS	AL	HS	HS	BC	BC	SK	JO	-	SG	-	BC		-
Asia	CB	KK	AL	GS	VE	VE	TC	TC	-	TC	-	OUT		
Sonia	SK	RH	TC	SK	LO	LO	BC	LO	-	GS	-	OUT		
Kate	FL	RA	NR	VE	JO	JO	GS	RH	-	OUT				
Yuen	VE	SK	GS	RA	SG	SG	LO	VE	-	OUT				
Paula	TC	LO	VE	JO	SK	SK	JO	OUT						
Lexi	LO	SG	SG	BC	RA	RA	OUT							
Christine	NR	FL	RH	LO	KK	OUT								
Natalia	SG	TC	LO	TC	OUT									
Lauren	BC	JO	BC	OUT										
Carmen	RA	HS	OUT											
Britney	AL	OUT												

^1 Male models were used for this challenge.

^2 New York City civic workers were used as models for this challenge.

- Afa Ah Loo - AL
- Bishme Cromartie - BC
- Cavanagh Baker - CB
- Frankie Lewis - FL
- Garo Sparo - GS
- Hester Sunshine - HS
- Jamall Osterholm - JO
- Kovid Kapoor - KK
- Lela Orr - LO
- Nadine Ralliford - NR
- Rakan Shams Aldeen - RA
- Renee Hill - RH
- Sebastian Gray - SG
- Sonia Kasparian - SK
- Tessa Clark - TC
- Venny Etienne - VE

== Episodes ==
=== Episode 1: First Impressions ===
Original airdate: March 14, 2019

Sixteen designers arrive in New York City for a fashion competition. The designers start by showcasing their outfits for host Karlie Kloss and judges Nina Garcia, Brandon Maxwell and Elaine Welteroth. Afterwards, the contestants meet their mentor, Christian Siriano. The designers receive their first challenge, to create a similar look to a known designer but with an unexpected twist.

- Judges: Karlie Kloss, Nina Garcia, Elaine Welteroth, Brandon Maxwell
- WINNER: Tessa Clark
- ELIMINATED: Cavanagh Baker

=== Episode 2: The Future is Here ===
Original airdate: March 21, 2019

This week’s challenge tasks the designers to create a mini-collection that shows a sneak peek into the future of fashion. The designers are split into teams, and their models are transformed with special effects body modifications inspired by Simon Huck’s ‘A. Human’ exhibit.

Designers must work in teams for this challenge:

Teams	Assigned Designers
Team Back Scaffolding	Bishme, Venny, Lela
Team Shoulder Horns	Hester, Nadine, Garo
Team Necklace	Sonia, Rakan, Jamall
Team Neck Ruffles	Afa, Tessa, Sebastian
Team Chest Feathers	Frankie, Kovid, Renee

Final Judging:

- Judges: Karlie Kloss, Nina Garcia, Elaine Welteroth, Brandon Maxwell
- WINNER: Sebastian Grey
- ELIMINATED: Frankie Lewis

=== Episode 3: All the Rage ===
Original airdate: March 28, 2019

The designers are tasked with creating bold head-to-toe looks using a single print. Celebrity stylist Marni Senofonte surprises the designers by lending her expertise in this go-big or go-home challenge.

- Judges: Karlie Kloss, Nina Garcia, Elaine Welteroth, Brandon Maxwell
- Guest Judge: Adam Selman (New York fashion designer)
- WINNER: Hester Sunshine
- ELIMINATED: Nadine Ralliford

=== Episode 4: Survive in Style ===
Original airdate: April 4, 2019

The designers are whisked away for a camping trip and challenged to create survival chic looks while embracing the wilderness. Their work room, the accessories wall and the runway itself have all been moved to the woods for this unconventional materials challenge. Celebrity stylist Marni Senofonte returns.

- Judges: Karlie Kloss, Nina Garcia, Elaine Welteroth, Brandon Maxwell
- WINNER: Renee Hill
- ELIMINATED: Afa Ah Loo

=== Episode 5: High Fashion to High Street ===
Original airdate: April 11, 2019

The designers visit the studio of trailblazer Dapper Dan, who introduced high fashion to the hip-hop world by creating luxury streetwear. The designers are given one day to create their own takes on the future of streetwear.

- Judges: Karlie Kloss, Nina Garcia, Elaine Welteroth, Brandon Maxwell
- Guest Judge: Brandice Daniel (founder and CEO of Harlem’s Fashion Row)
- WINNER: Bishme Cromartie
- ELIMINATED: Kovid Kapoor

=== Episode 6: Power Play ===
Original airdate: April 18, 2019

Three women breaking ground in the video game industry visit the runway, helping the designers understand how clothing for powerful women works in video games. The designers are challenged to create their own female video game protagonists with a functional and stylish look.

- Judges: Karlie Kloss, Nina Garcia, Elaine Welteroth, Brandon Maxwell
- Guest Judge: Robin Hunicke (American video game designer)
- WINNER: Hester Sunshine
- ELIMINATED: Rakan Shams Aldeen

=== Episode 7: Elegance is the New Black ===
Original airdate: April 25, 2019

The final ten designers are surprised with an invitation to a Brandon Maxwell photo shoot featuring Karlie Kloss. They must impress Maxwell with their takes on elegance, and are faced with a flash sale challenge.

- Judges: Karlie Kloss, Nina Garcia, Elaine Welteroth, Brandon Maxwell
- WINNER: Jamall Osterholm
- ELIMINATED: Sonia Kasparian

=== Episode 8: Blame It on Rio ===
Original airdate: May 2, 2019

Stylist Marni Senofonte challenges the designers to create a mini-collection for actress Morena Baccarin ("Deadpool") to wear on vacation in Rio de Janeiro. Each collection must include three looks: daywear, evening wear, and beach wear.

Designers must work in teams to create cohesive looks that tell a vacation fashion story:

Teams	Assigned Designers
Team Disco Queen	Hester, Bishme, Garo
Team Carnival	Jamall, Renee, Venny
Team Rio Holiday	Sebastian, Tessa, Lela

- Judges: Elaine Welteroth, Brandon Maxwell
- Guest Judges: Morena Baccarin & Marni Senofonte
- WINNER: Hester Sunshine
- ELIMINATED: Renee Hill

=== Episode 9: The Stitch is Back ===
Original airdate: May 9, 2019

The designers are challenged to create over-the-top looks inspired by the movie "Rocketman,", the life story of musician Elton John. Designers receive help from some highly-qualified assistants for this project.

- Judges: Karlie Kloss, Nina Garcia, Elaine Welteroth, Brandon Maxwell
- Guest Judge: Julian Day (costume designer for "Rocketman")
- WINNER: Garo Sparo
- ELIMINATED: Lela Orr

=== Episode 10: What Do You Care About? ===
Original airdate: May 16, 2019

The designers dig deep into this challenge to use their skills to bring attention to a social cause they care about. Elaine Welteroth mentors each designer on channeling their creative voice for change. Designers also have to make and model their own printed T-shirts with their social message.

- Judges: Karlie Kloss, Nina Garcia, Elaine Welteroth, Brandon Maxwell
- Guest Judge: Aurora James (founder and creative director of footwear company Brother Vellies)
- WINNER: Bishme Cromartie
- ELIMINATED: Venny Etienne

=== Episode 11: New York City of Dreams ===
Original airdate: May 23, 2019

The designers head to Christian Siriano's store and atelier, The Curated NYC, where they meet the women who keep New York City moving: a New York school teacher, and civic workers from the USPS, DSNY, FDNY, NYPD, and NYC Ferry. Each designer is asked to create a custom dream dress for their client.

- Judges: Karlie Kloss, Nina Garcia, Elaine Welteroth, Brandon Maxwell
- Guest Judge: Danielle Brooks (actress and singer)
- WINNER: Sebastian Grey
- ELIMINATED: Jamall Osterholm

=== Episode 12: The Art of Fashion ===
Original airdate: May 30, 2019

It's the last challenge to determine which four designers move on to the finale; they must create their biggest and best looks as well as design experimental art installations. Rapper Cardi B attends the art installation event as Christian Siriano's guest and provides feedback to the designers.

After judging, the final four are given five months and $10,000 to create ten looks.

- Judges: Karlie Kloss, Nina Garcia, Elaine Welteroth, Brandon Maxwell
- Guest Judge: Linda Fargo (senior vice president at Bergdorf Goodman)
- WINNER: Garo Sparo
- ELIMINATED: Tessa Clark

=== Episode 13: One Elle of a Day ===
Original airdate: June 6, 2019

The four remaining designers arrive at a new work space to unpack their collections and learn their final challenge. Nina Garcia meets them at the Elle Magazine offices and the designers are sent spiraling when tasked with a surprise eleventh look. In the end, only three of them will move on to compete in the finale.

- Judges: Karlie Kloss, Nina Garcia, Elaine Welteroth, Brandon Maxwell
- Guest Judge: Steven Kolb (President & CEO of CFDA)
- FINAL THREE: Garo Sparo, Hester Sunshine, Sebastian Grey
- ELIMINATED: Bishme Cromartie

=== Episode 14: The Final Runway ===
Original airdate: June 13, 2019

The final three designers grapple with all aspects of putting together a runway, from model casting to hair and make up to deciding what outfits will give them the best chance for the win. Pressure is at an all-time high when they find out the guest judge is designer Diane von Fürstenberg.

- Judges: Karlie Kloss, Nina Garcia, Elaine Welteroth, Brandon Maxwell
- Guest Judge: Diane von Fürstenberg
- WINNER: Sebastian Grey
- ELIMINATED: Hester Sunshine, Garo Sparo
