= KWK =

KWK may refer to:

- KWK, former call sign of the radio station KXFN
- KWK-FM, former call sign of the radio station WARH
- KWK-TV, former call sign of the television station KMOV
- KwK, abbreviation of Kampfwagenkanone
- KWK, abbreviation of Kode With Klossy
- Kwigillingok Airport
- Koffee with Karan, an Indian talk show hosted by Karan Johar
