= Sofia Ongele =

American software developer and activist

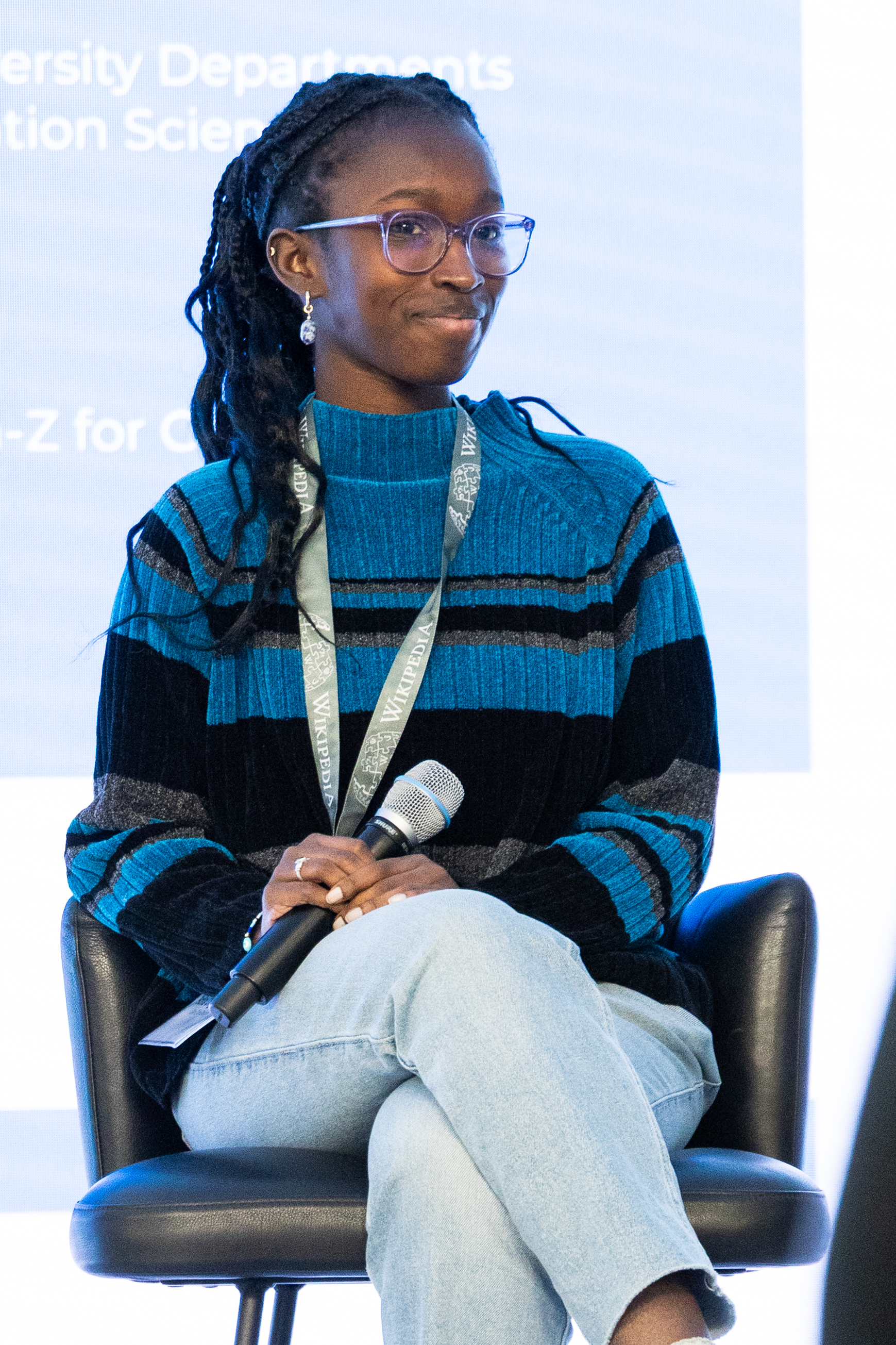
- Ongele at the Wikimedia Futures Lab, 2026
- Born: 2000
- Occupation: Computer scientist

Sofia Ong'ele (born 21 September 2000) is an American software developer and hacktivist. She is the Director of Digital Strategy at Gen-Z for Change and starred in the 2022 Disney+ documentary Growing Up.

== Early life and education ==
Ong'ele was born and raised in Santa Clarita, California, and began programming at age 15. In an interview with Bloomberg News, Ong'ele said she attended Kode with Klossy, a summer class for young girls from the ages of 13 to 18, which was created by fashion model Karlie Kloss. She then attended Apple's Engineering Technology Camp, and in 2020 was named a winner of Apple's WWDC20 Swift Student Challenge.

At age 17 she created her first app, ReDawn, which is meant to support sexual assault survivors. She also began providing coding mentoring to her peers.

In 2020, during the COVID-19 pandemic, Ong'ele began posting on TikTok, discussing her experiences as a Black woman living in the United States, and social causes such as reproductive rights. She has accumulated more than 300,000 followers on TikTok. In 2023, Ong'ele was one of three Gen-Z content creator-activists who joined the Sustainable Media Center’s Board of Advisors.

Ong'ele graduated from Columbia University in 2024 with a bachelor's degree in Computer and Information Sciences. She joined the anti-war protests at the university in April 2024.

== Awards ==
Ong'ele has garnered recognition, including receiving the California Endowment Voices for Change Award and was honored as a CES Young Innovator to Watch.
