= Sergio Guadarrama =

American fashion designer

- Born: Austin, Texas; February 22, 1982 (age 44)
- Education: Fashion Institute of Design & Merchandising; Fashion Institute of Technology
- Occupation: Fashion designer
- Partner: Kade Johnson

Sergio Guadarrama (born 1982) is an Austin-based Mexican-American fashion designer. He is the founder of Celestino Couture, a fashion designing company based in Hudson, New York.

== Personal life and education ==
Guadarrama was born in Austin, Texas in 1982 and was raised in Mexico. Later he moved to Cedar Park, Texas, and attended Cedar Park High School. He was awarded his degree in fashion designing from Fashion Institute of Design & Merchandising, and Fashion Institute of Technology, graduating in 2007.

== Career ==
Guadarrama established a fashion designing company Celestino Couture in 2005. The company is now based in Hudson County, New Jersey.

Guadarrama designed Billy Porter's ensemble for the Tony Awards 2019. He was a participant in Project Runway season 18. He was among the top four who got the chance to present the collection at New York Fashion Week. His collection is mostly influenced by the political and environmental issues.
