= Afa Ah Loo =

Samoan fashion designer (1985–2025)

- Born: Arthur Folasa Ah Loo; October 1985; Satupaʻitea, Samoa
- Died: June 14, 2025 (aged 39); Salt Lake City, Utah, U.S.
- Occupation: Fashion designer
- Years active: 2013–2025
- Spouse: Laura
- Children: 2
- Website: afaahloo.com

Arthur Folasa Ah Loo (October 1985 – June 14, 2025), better known as Afa Ah Loo, was a Samoan fashion designer. He competed on season 17 of Project Runway.

== Early life and education ==
Ah Loo was born in October 1985 in Samoa, and grew up in Satupaitea and the villages of Falelima (Vaisigano), Lotopa (Tuamasaga), and Neiafu with three brothers and two sisters. As a child, he helped support his grandparents by selling fruits and vegetables. He began sewing in a home economics class at his high school, World College of Western Samoa. Although he enjoyed sewing and designing, they were primarily considered women's tasks. His mother, who had sewn throughout his childhood, encouraged him to pursue designing anyway. Some of his first major projects were creating Sunday dresses for his younger sisters. His first adult-sized dress was a gift for his mother.

Ah Loo was a member of The Church of Jesus Christ of Latter-day Saints, and served a mission in Salt Lake City. He attended Brigham Young University-Hawaii, where he studied political science.

== Career ==
Ah Loo was a self-taught designer. He prided himself on designing clothing for all body types.

Ah Loo launched his titular brand in 2013. In 2015, Ah Loo exhibited his work at Fiji Fashion Week and LA Fashion Week. He also designed two outfits for Miss World Samoa Latafale Auva'a to use at the Miss World 2015 pageant in Sanya, China. By 2016, Ah Loo was working as a bridal designer. In 2018, he represented Samoa at the Commonwealth Fashion Exchange at Buckingham Palace in London. That same year, he was nominated for the Samoa Business Network's People's Choice Award.

In 2019, Ah Loo competed on season 17 of Project Runway, finishing in 13th place. During his run, he "focused on colorful and boldly patterned designs". He also became known for being the fastest sewer, and sometimes helped other contestants with their projects after finishing early. He returned to the show two years later on Project Runway Redemption.

In 2022, he designed an outfit for Danna Bui-Negrete of The Real Housewives of Salt Lake City. In 2023, he designed the traditional gown for Miss Global Samoa Haylanni Pearl Kurrupu. In 2024, he designed an outfit for actress Auli'i Cravalho to wear to the premiere of Moana 2.

In 2023, Ah Loo co-founded Utah Pacific Fashion, the state's first fashion show focusing on designers from Oceania. Ah Loo founded nonprofit organization Creative Pacific in 2024. He was also a mentor at the Nafanua Foundation in Salt Lake City.

== Personal life ==
While visiting his sister in Utah, Ah Loo met his future wife, Laura. He moved to Utah permanently in 2016 and the two married. The couple had two young children at the time of Ah Loo's death. He and his family lived in Utah.

== Death ==
On June 14, 2025, Ah Loo was shot while attending the No Kings protest in Salt Lake City. Ah Loo was shot when volunteer "peacekeepers", brought in by the event organizers, shot at a man who was carrying a rifle. Police later confirmed Ah Loo was an innocent bystander, and had not been an intended target. Ah Loo was transported to a hospital, where he died. He was 39. Utah police announced an investigation into his death was ongoing. Ah Loo's widow later pursued a wrongful death claim through Parker & McConkie Personal Injury Lawyers.

Ah Loo was the only reported fatality during the series of nationwide protests.
