= Project Runway Latin America =

- Created by: Eli Holzman
- Starring: Rebecca de Alba; Mariano Toledo; Ángel Sánchez; Monica Fonseca (2011); Claudia Pandolfo (2010)
- Countries of origin: S1: Argentina; S2: United States; S3: Mexico
- No. of episodes: 36

Production
- Running time: 60 minutes

Original release
- Network: Fashion TV Latin America (2010); Glitz* (2011-2012)
- Release: September 20, 2010 – 2012

Project Runway Latin America is a Latin American reality television series on Glitz* which focuses on fashion designs and is hosted by model Rebecca de Alba. The contestants will have to compete with each other to create the best clothes and are usually restricted in time, materials and theme. Their designs are to be judged, and one or more designers are eliminated each week. The show was canceled after its third season.

== First season ==
The first season was broadcast on Fashion TV Latin America from September 20, 2010 to November 29, 2010. The show was filmed in the city of Buenos Aires, Argentina and the final was filmed on the Atlantis Resort in the Bahamas. The winner won $20,000 to start his or her own collection and be presented in the Puerto Rico High Fashion Week, DF Fashion Week and the cover of Elle Magazine Mexico, plus one week for two at the luxurious Atlantis Resort, in the Paradise Island in the Bahamas, courtesy of the sponsors of the event marks.

It included the participation of 15 designers from Argentina, Brazil, Chile, Colombia, Mexico, Nicaragua, and Venezuela. It is hosted by Mexican model and presenter Rebecca de Alba, who is also part of the jury alongside the Venezuelan designer Ángel Sánchez and the Argentinian journalist and fashion producer Claudia Pandolfo. The designers were mentored by the Argentinian designer Mariano Toledo. The competition was won by Colombian designer Jorge Duque.

There were 12 challenges which included: Pack Attack, A Model for my Model, Film Tour, Makeup, Innovation and Creativity, Burlesque, MasterCard Woman, Woman of the Future, OLAY Challenge, The Color of Divas, Paper Bride and Pantone Challenge. Guests judges for this season included Fabián Zitta, Jorque Lentino, Min Agostini, Hernán Zajar, Sara Galindo, Florencia Raggi, Óscar Madrazo, and Clara González. This season's runner up Shantall Lacayo relocated to the USA and was chosen as a contestant for season 19 of Project Runway, eventually winning the season.

Contestants Elimination Progress
Contestants			Episodes												
Designer	Age	Country	1	2	3	4	5	6	7	8	9	10	11	12	Finale
Jorge Duque	35	Colombia	IN	WIN	IN	HIGH	IN	HIGH	HIGH	IN	LOW	LOW	LOW	ADV	WINNER
Catalina Rautenberg	38	Argentina	HIGH	HIGH	HIGH	IN	LOW	IN	LOW	WIN	HIGH	HIGH	WIN	WIN	RUNNER-UP
Shantall Lacayo	26	Nicaragua	WIN	IN	HIGH	HIGH	WIN	HIGH	IN	LOW	WIN	LOW	HIGH	ADV	3RD PLACE
Eduardo de Crisci	25	Argentina	IN	IN	WIN	IN	IN	LOW	WIN	IN	LOW	HIGH	LOW	OUT	
Hector Machuca	28	Venezuela	IN	IN	LOW	IN	IN	WIN	HIGH	IN	IN	WIN	OUT		
Noé Roa	30	Mexico	HIGH	IN	IN	LOW	IN	IN	IN	LOW	LOW	OUT			
Mauro Babun	29	Mexico	LOW	HIGH	IN	WIN	HIGH	LOW	LOW	IN	OUT				
Laura "Chabe" Carrillo	26	Mexico	IN	IN	IN	IN	LOW	IN	IN	OUT					
Paula Valencia	26	Colombia	IN	IN	IN	LOW	HIGH	IN	OUT						
Wilson "Messhaz" Chaparro	23	Colombia	IN	LOW	LOW	IN	IN	OUT							
Andrequieli "Quieli" Geibhar	26	Brazil	IN	IN	IN	IN	OUT								
Laura Grosskopf	25	Argentina	LOW	IN	IN	OUT									
Marina Hidalgo Rojas	28	Chile	IN	LOW	OUT										
Alex Peimbert	32	Mexico	IN	OUT											
Ailin Bisi	23	Argentina	OUT												

The designer won Project Runway Latin America.
The designer advanced to fashion week.
The designer won the challenge.
The designer was in the top two for that challenge, but did not win.
The designer had one of the highest scores for that challenge, but did not win.
The designer had one of the lowest scores for that challenge, but was not eliminated.
The designer was in the bottom 2, but was not eliminated.
The designer lost and was out of the competition.

== Second season ==
The second season premiered September 5, 2011 on Glitz*. The show was filmed in the city of Miami, Florida. The winner will win $30,000 to start his or her own collection, the possibility of presenting his collection at the Mercedes Benz DF Fashion Week México, a magazine photo shoot for Glamour México and Latin America, plus one week for two at the luxurious Live Aqua Cancún Hotel, courtesy of the sponsors of the event marks.

It included the participation of 14 designers from Argentina, Chile, Colombia, Mexico, Uruguay, Puerto Rico, and Venezuela. It is hosted by Mexican model and presenter Rebecca de Alba, who is also part of the jury alongside the Venezuelan designer Ángel Sánchez and the Colombian model and presenter Monica Fonseca. The designers were mentored by the Argentinian designer Mariano Toledo.

Contestants Elimination Progress
Contestants			Episodes												
Designer	Age	Country	1	2	3	4	5	6	7	8	9	10	11	12	Finale
Karyn Coo	22	Chile	WIN	HIGH	IN	LOW	HIGH	HIGH	HIGH	IN	HIGH	HIGH	LOW	ADV	WINNER
José Luis Gonsalez	22	Mexico	IN	HIGH	WIN	IN	IN	LOW	IN	HIGH	LOW	WIN	WIN	ADV	RUNNER-UP
Carlo Carrizosa	22	Colombia	IN	IN	HIGH	IN	IN	LOW	IN	HIGH	WIN	IN	IN	WIN	3RD PLACE
Erika Servin	26	Mexico	IN	WIN	HIGH	WIN	IN	HIGH	LOW	WIN	LOW	LOW	LOW	OUT	
Matías Cristino	28	Argentina	IN	IN	IN	IN	WIN	LOW	IN	LOW	LOW	LOW	OUT		
Valeria "Vale" Fernández	25	Uruguay	HIGH	IN	IN	IN	IN	LOW	WIN	LOW	OUT				
Juan Colon	30	Puerto Rico	IN	IN	IN	HIGH	HIGH	WIN	IN	OUT					
Ramiro Vera	28	Mexico	IN	IN	LOW	IN	IN	LOW	OUT						
Alisa Kononnenko	34	Argentina	IN	IN	IN	LOW	LOW	OUT							
Valentina Wolfermann	23	Venezuela	IN	LOW	IN	IN	OUT								
Juan Carlos Lozano	32	Colombia	HIGH	LOW	LOW	OUT									
Isabel Silva	23	Colombia	LOW	IN	OUT										
Stephanie Reynoso	22	Mexico	LOW	OUT											
Jaime Inda	22	Mexico	OUT												

The designer won Project Runway Latin America.
The designer advanced to fashion week.
The designer won the challenge.
The designer had one of the highest scores for that challenge, but did not win.
The designer had one of the lowest scores for that challenge, but was not eliminated.
The designer was in the bottom 2, but was not eliminated.
The designer lost and was out of the competition.

== Third season ==
The third season aired on September 2, 2013, and was released on Glitz*. It was filmed in Mexico City, Mexico and included the participation of 16 designers from Argentina, Bolivia, Brazil, Chile, Colombia, El Salvador, Mexico, and Venezuela. It was hosted by the Venezuelan presenter Eglantina Zingg, who is also part of the jury along with the Venezuelan designer Angel Sanchez and Mexican Ariadne Grant. The designers were advised by Colombian designer Jorge Duque. The winner received a photo spread in Marie Claire Mexico and Marie Claire Latin America, and the chance to present a fashion show at Miami Fashion Week.

Contestants Elimination Progress
Contestants			Episodes												
Designer	Age	Country	1	2	3	4	5	6	7	8	9	10	11	12	Finale
Matías Hernán	24	Chile	WIN	LOW	HIGH	LOW	IN	HIGH	HIGH	LOW	HIGH	WIN	HIGH	ADV	WINNER
Mariana Arellano	27	Venezuela	LOW	IN	HIGH	LOW	HIGH	LOW	IN	LOW	HIGH	LOW	HIGH	WIN	RUNNER-UP
Eneas Neto	32	Brazil	IN	IN	IN	IN	HIGH	WIN	LOW	LOW	LOW	LOW	WIN	ADV	3RD PLACE
Steph Orozco	23	Mexico	IN	WIN	LOW	IN	IN	HIGH	IN	WIN	LOW	HIGH	LOW	ADV	4TH PLACE
Lorena Kaethner	29	Argentina	IN	IN	HIGH	WIN	LOW	LOW	WIN	LOW	HIGH	HIGH	OUT		
Jonathan Morales	26	Mexico	HIGH	HIGH	IN	IN	WIN	LOW	HIGH	WIN	WIN	DQ			
Gustavo García	26	Bolivia	IN	IN	WIN	WIN	IN	HIGH	IN	LOW	OUT				
Alejandro Dejay	32	Venezuela	IN	IN	LOW	LOW	LOW	HIGH	LOW	OUT					
Mariana Velez	26	Colombia	IN	IN	IN	IN	LOW	LOW	OUT						
Lalula Vivenzi	26	Colombia	IN	LOW	IN	IN	IN	OUT							
Salim Kadamani	21	Colombia	LOW	IN	IN	IN	OUT								
Valeria De La Fuente	19	Mexico	IN	IN	LOW	OUT									
Gimena Figueroa	30	Argentina	IN	LOW	OUT										
Estefania Agussi	25	Colombia	IN	OUT											
Luis Gerardo Tamez	39	Mexico	OUT												
Mario Rodriguez	21	El Salvador	OUT												

The designer won Project Runway Latin America.
The designer advanced to fashion week.
The designer won the challenge.
The designer had one of the highest scores for that challenge, but did not win.
The designer had one of the lowest scores for that challenge, but was not eliminated.
The designer was in the bottom 2, but was not eliminated.
The designer lost and was out of the competition.
The designer was disqualified from the competition.

== See also ==
- Project Runway
