= Ashley Longshore =

American painter

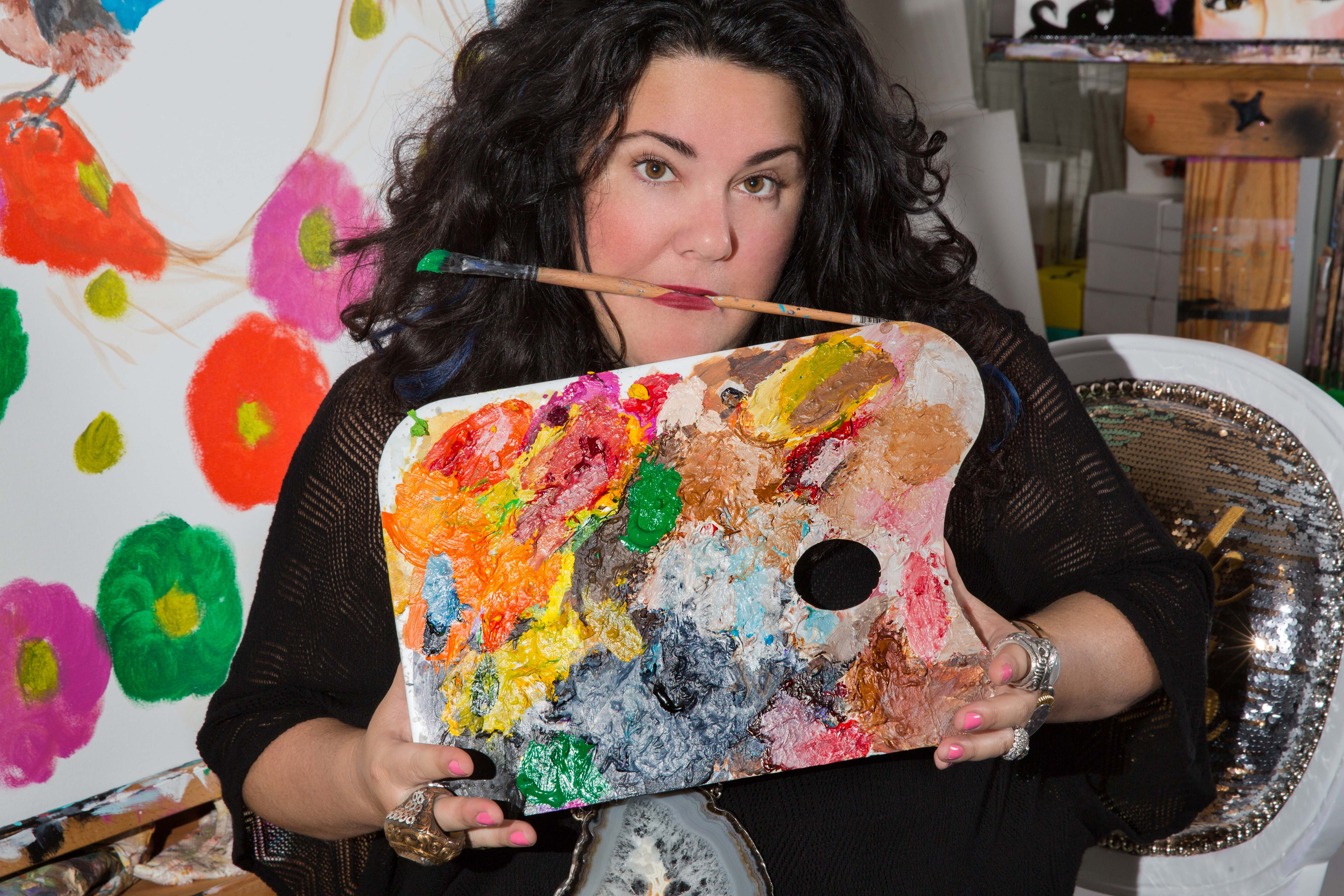
- Born: Sarah Ashley Longshore; Montgomery, Alabama
- Education: University of Montana
- Occupations: Artist, entrepreneur
- Website: www.ashleylongshore.com

Sarah Ashley Longshore is a New York-based painter and entrepreneur. She is the owner of the Longshore Studio Gallery, located on 43 Crosby Street in SoHo, New York. Longshore's art focuses on pop culture, Hollywood glamour, and American consumerism. She has been described as being one of the "most audacious and unapologetic voices of pop art" and as an "avatar of pop feminism to thousands of followers."

Longshore was on Brit + Co’s list of "16 Female Artists You Should Know" and visiting her former studio was listed as one of the "15 Best Things to do In New Orleans" by Condé Nast Traveler. She has worked with celebrity art collectors including Blake Lively, Salma Hayek, Eli Manning, and Penélope Cruz.

== Early life ==
Longshore was born in Montgomery, Alabama to Spencer Longshore III, the president and CEO of Time and Space Inc., an advertising sales company. She was exposed to the arts as a child and took lessons in tap dancing, ballet, theatre, piano, jazz, and voice. Following her graduation from Brenau Academy, an all-girl boarding school located in Gainesville, Georgia, Longshore obtained a Bachelor of Arts in English literature from the University of Montana. While a student at the University of Montana, Longshore took a semester off to paint. Longshore is a self-taught artist, and spent much of her early career reproducing Picasso paintings. She put together a portfolio and began showing her work to galleries around Missoula, Montana. Her first art show was at a small-town gallery.

== Career ==
In 2011, Longshore was commissioned by Chloé to create a painting that depicted the fashion house's history.

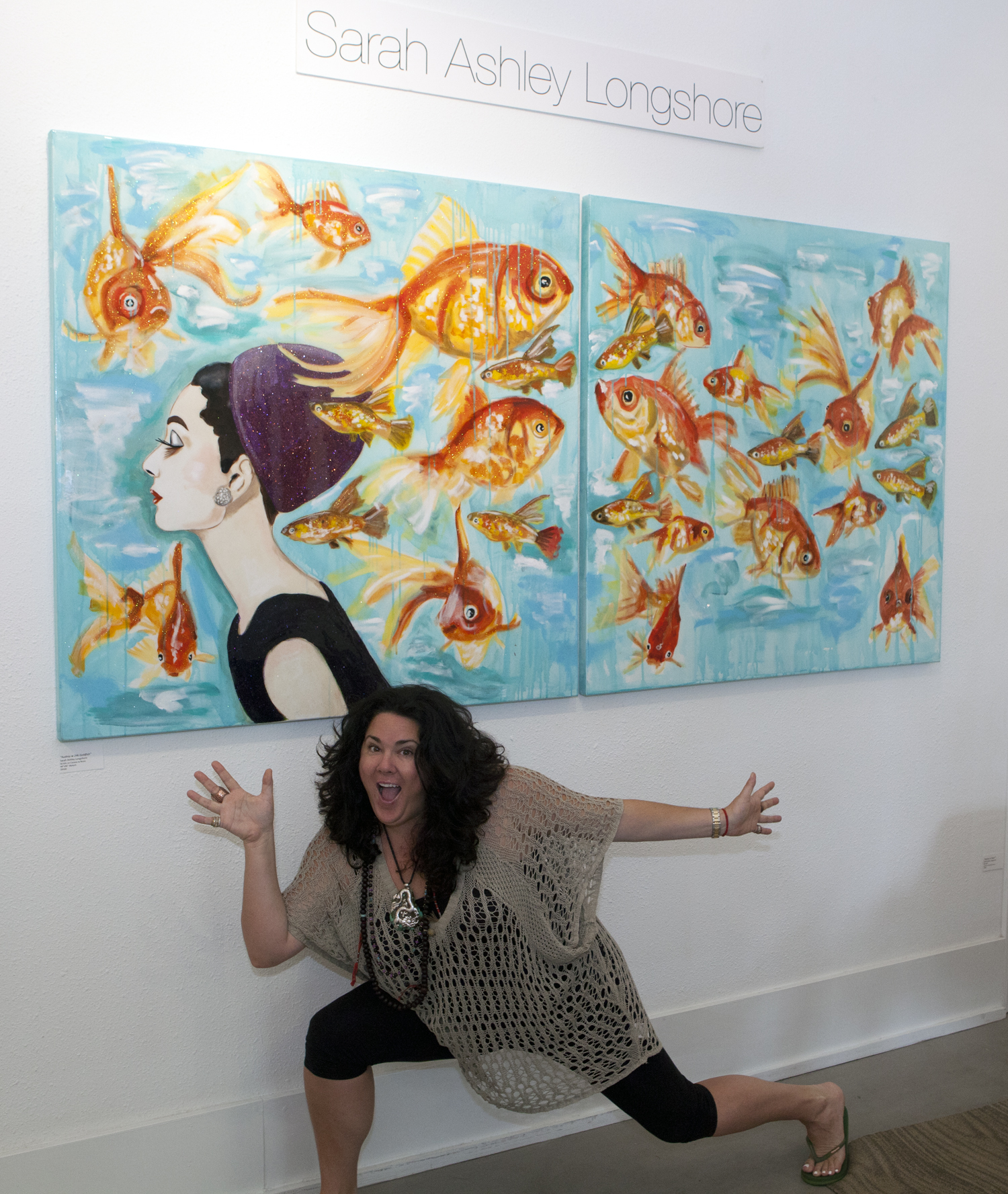
Longshore with Audrey Diptych, 2014

In September 2013, Longshore held a pop-up art exhibition entitled “Fashionably Late” at the Pop-Up Art Gallery in New York City.

Longshore was featured on Vogue.com in Spring 2014, where she spoke about the role of Instagram as an emerging platform for art sales. In 2015, Longshore sold over $1 million worth of art. CUE Magazine recognized Longshore as a New Orleans Style Maker in 2016. In August 2016, Longshore's office and studio was featured on Elle Decor. Longshore partnered with fashion brand Cle de Peau and designed a line of home goods in 2016. In February 2017, she released her first book You Don't Look Fat, You Look Crazy: An Unapologetic Guide to Being Ambitchous, as "tongue-in-cheek guide to living an 'ambitchous' life". In November 2018, she created artwork for to support the launch of Gucci’s “Do It Yourself” initiative.

In 2019, Longshore partnered with Maybelline to create lipstick packaging based on her artwork. She also partnered with Eric Buterbaugh for her first LA show, which took place at his personal gallery.

In January 2020, Longshore was featured as a guest judge on season 18 of Project Runway.

In 2021, The Peninsula Beverly Hills celebrated its 30th anniversary with Longshore acting as an Artist-In-Residence, featuring 20+ new works created by Longshore during her residency around the hotel. Longshore and Judith Leiber launched their second collection collaboration in November 2020.

In 2022, YoungArts launched The Ashley Longshore Excellence in the Arts Award, an annual unrestricted $25,000 grant to support visual arts, photography, and musical theatre artists.

In 2023, Longshore collaborated with Porsche USA to create artwork for ads to be used as murals in cities throughout the U.S. She opened a gallery in SoHo, NYC of September of that year.

In March 2024, Longshore released a limited edition “Press for Champagne” ring with jewelry designer Harwell Godfrey. She released her fourth book Giving the Bird: Bird Stories by Ashley Longshore in September 2024.

Longshore made her Art Fair debut during Miami Art Week at Aqua Art Fair in December 2024. Also in December 2024, Longshore and Judith Leiber Couture released a bust collection.

== Artwork ==
Art New Orleans featured a Longshore painting on the cover of its Spring 2013 issue and Vie Magazine featured her art on the cover of its May 2013 issue.

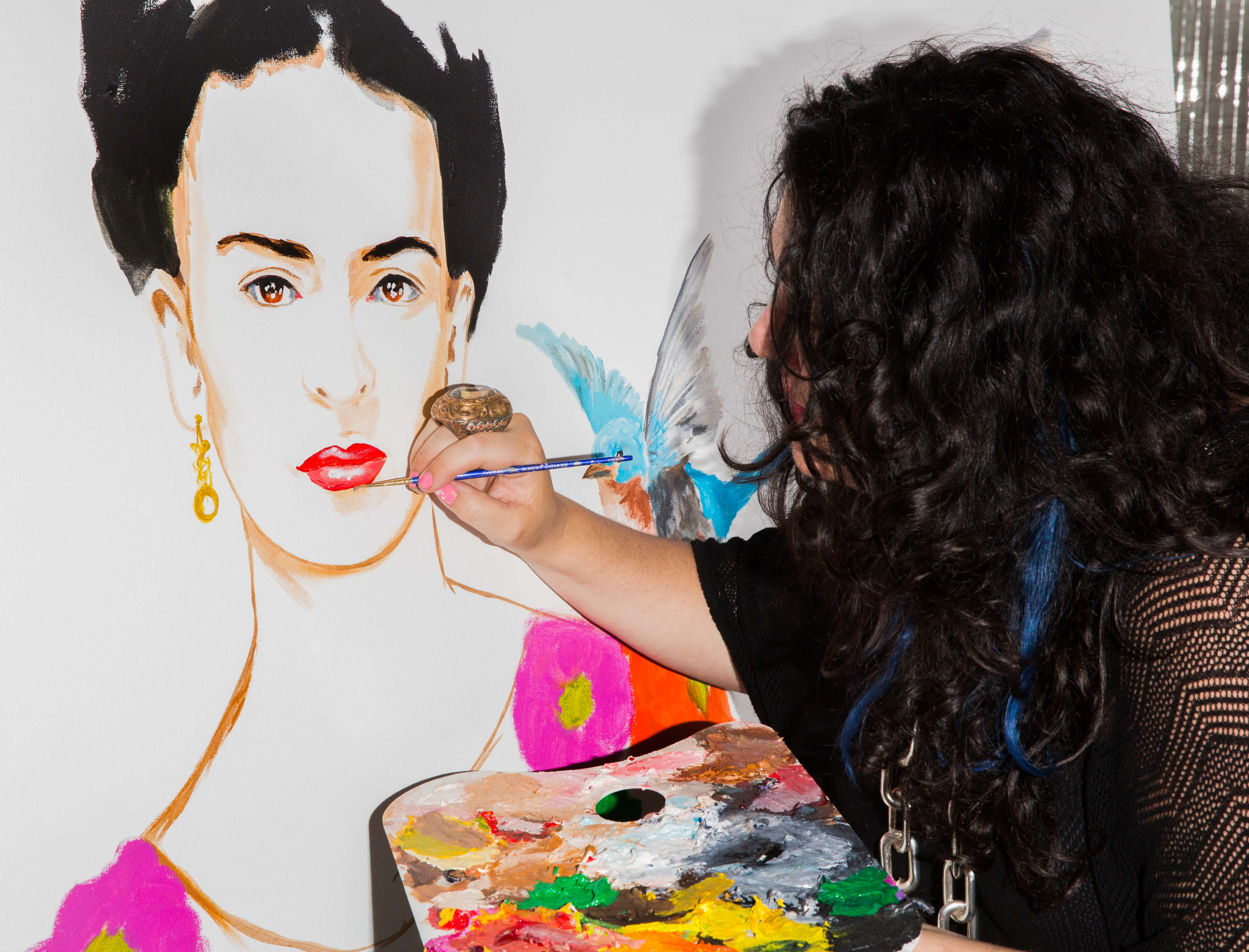
Longshore painting Frida Kahlo, 2014

In 2014, Longshore announced a collaboration with friend and long-time client Blake Lively for Lively's lifestyle e-commerce site Preserve. Longshore and Lively began working together at Longshore's studio shortly before Lively's site launched. Later that year, she created a holiday exhibit for Kirna Zabete featuring “Jingle My Bells.” Kirna Zabete has 20 pieces of Longshore's work exhibited. In 2015, Longshore was featured by Forbes on a list of 21 contemporary artists. That same year, Longshore's work was also featured at the Cornell Museum in an exhibit titled “Bling: Art That Shines.” The collection included Longshore's large-scale portraits highlighting celebrity excess. Her pieces Audrey in Slipper Orchid Headdress and Subtleties Are Not Her Specialty were among the featured works in the exhibit. In 2015, Longshore launched Artgasm, a direct-to-collector subscription program inspired by TuneCore.

In fall 2015, Longshore debuted a collection of satirical fashion portraits during New York Fashion Week. She became the first artist to secure a collaboration with the Bryant Park Hotel with a Longshore-designed suite featuring the collection of seven bold portraits of iconic names in fashion.

In January 2018, Longshore became the first solo female artist to exhibit at the Bergdorf Goodman Building. As part of the exhibit, Longshore's work was placed in six different Bergdorf Goodman window displays on Fifth Avenue.

In March 2019 Longshore exhibited 37 paintings she created of iconic women in a one-woman show at and as a commission for the Diane von Fürstenberg flagship store in the Meatpacking District of Manhattan in New York City in celebration of Women's History Month.

In March 2020, as part of Women's History Month, Sprinkles Cupcakes featured Longshore's artwork on its limited edition White Chocolate Raspberry cupcake.

In October 2021, Longshore created an installation for the Netflix premiere of Gwyneth Paltrow’s Sex, Love & goop. That same month, she debuted her new furniture collection with Ken Fulk at the Prodigal Fun exhibition, which also featured approximately 70 large-scale pop art paintings by Longshore.

Longshore has also released two collections of NFTs. The first, based on her book of portraits of women, ROAR, was released in January 2022. The second, IT'S A MAN'S WORLD, focused on portraits of real and fictional men, was released in June 2022.

== Bibliography ==
- You Don't Look Fat, You Look Crazy: An Unapologetic Guide to Being Ambitchous (2017)
- I Do Not Cook, I Do Not Clean, I Do Not Fly Commercial (2019)
- Roar!: A Collection of Mighty Women (2021)
- Giving the Bird: Bird Stories by Ashley Longshore (2024)

== Personal life ==
Longshore lived in New Orleans with her partner Michael Smith through 2022.
