= Shantall Lacayo =

Nicaraguan fashion designer

Shantall Lacayo (born May 4, 1984) is a Nicaraguan fashion designer. She is known for being a contestant on Project Runway Latin America and Project Runway, as well as for her design company and fashion shows.

== Early life ==
Lacayo was born in Managua, Nicaragua on May 4, 1984. She began working as a fashion designer at the age of 17. In 2003, she attended U.A.M. for marketing and publicity, finishing her studies in 2008. She subsequently moved to Buenos Aires, Argentina to continue studying design and fabrics technology at Escuela Argentina de Moda.

== Career ==
In 2009, Lacayo opened her first studio in San Telmo, Buenos Aires. In 2010, she was invited to compete on the first season of Project Runway Latin America, where she made it to the finale. Lacayo, alongside Camila Ortega Murillo, founded Nicaragua Diseña in 2012, a platform for promoting Nicaraguan designers. In 2015, Lacayo dressed Nicaraguan filmmaker Gabriel Serra at the 87th Academy Awards.

Lacayo settled in Miami, Florida, to help build her brand in the United States. In May 2018, her show at Miami Fashion Week was the subject of protests due to her association with Camila Ortega Murillo, the daughter of controversial Nicaraguan politicians Daniel Ortega and Rosario Murillo. Public figures such as Ana Navarro and Ileana Ros-Lehtinen spoke out against Lacayo's participation. Lacayo subsequently cancelled her show. That November, Lacayo also declined to participate in the Nicaragua Diseña event in solidarity against the Ortega regime.

In 2019, as part of the Fashion Designers of Latin America (FDLA), Lacayo participated in her first New York Fashion Week.

In 2021, Lacayo participated in season 19 of the reality television series Project Runway. Lacayo won the grand prize of the competition, the first Latin American woman to do so. She planned to move to New York following the win.
