= Kode With Klossy =

American coding camp (2015–present)

- Formation: 2015; 11 years ago
- Founder: Karlie Kloss
- Type: Nonprofit
- Headquarters: New York City, New York, United States

Kode with Klossy is an American 501(c)(3) organization which provides free coding camps for girls and non-binary teens, founded in 2015 by Karlie Kloss and headquartered in New York City, New York, United States. Camps are held during the summer from June to August. Applicants must be ages 13–18 to participate. Attendees can join camps that are held virtually online. In-person camps are available in various cities within and outside of the U.S., including in London, Atlanta, Austin, Boston, Chicago, Dallas/Richardson, Washington D.C., Indianapolis, Los Angeles, Miami, New York City, Philadelphia, Pittsburgh, San Francisco, Seattle, and St. Louis. Kode with Klossy offers the following computer science curriculums: web development, machine learning, mobile app, and data science.

== History ==
In 2016, Kloss created her own free two-week coding bootcamp for teen girls and non-binary teens, Kode with Klossy.

Kode with Klossy teaches the basics of numerous programming languages, such as Ruby, JavaScript, and Swift. By the end of the program, participants in the camp have built fully functional mobile apps or websites.

During the COVID-19 pandemic, Kode with Klossy has utilized Zoom to include scholars from over a hundred countries in workshops. In 2023, the camp added a workshop in London.

As of 2024, Kode with Klossy has partnerships with various corporations including Apple, Chegg, Estée Lauder, Goldman Sachs, Carolina Herrera, Google, Infosys, WeWork, and Wix.com. The coding camp also collaborates with Flatiron School, Turing School, and Teach for America.

== Alumni ==
Many scholars use the coding skills they develop at Kode with Klossy to further social justice causes. One alumnus, Sofia Ongele, created an app, ReDawn (2017), to provide resources to survivors of sexual assault. Another alumnus created an app to inform users of safe running routes in their neighborhood.

Kode with Klossy scholar, Maya Dummett, “has worked on creating apps to improve social welfare services and created a chatbot called "M" who encourages others to pursue STEM.” KWK scholar, Etasha Donthi, created her own organization for marginalized kids in STEM.

By 2021, 8,000 scholars had graduated from Kode with Klossy. According to Texas Metro News, “78% of those who attended Kode with Klossy camps pursued majors or minors in computer science.”
