= Geoffrey Mac =

American fashion designer (born 1977)

Geoffrey Mac (born March 24, 1977) is an American fashion designer. Mac has appeared on reality television shows such as America's Next Top Model and Project Runway. He is known for the use of latex in his designs.

== Life and career ==
Mac attended the School of the Art Institute of Chicago, where he earned his BFA in 1999. It was in Chicago where the Geoffrey Mac launched his latex clothing company. His line was sold at Marshall Field's flagship store after Mac won their "Distinction in Design" contest. His designs were later featured in publications such as Rolling Stone and V.

In 2003, the Fashion Group International selected Mac for the "Style Makers & Rule Breakers Award for Apparel". In 2004, he was further recognized in the Chicago Tribune as the "Young Designer of the Year". One of his designs was acquired for the permanent collection of the Chicago Historical Museum.

Mac moved to New York City in 2004, where he worked briefly with designer Cynthia Rowley. He developed a following and designed with celebrity clients such as Deee-Lite, and Lil' Kim. Mac also collaborated with Zaldy Goco, an influential fashion designer, for high-profile clients such as Lady Gaga for her Monster Ball Tour, Scissor Sisters, and Britney Spears for her 2011 Femme Fatale Tour.

Mac made his official NYFW Runway debut on February 12, 2012 at the famous Exit Art venue. The show featured wigs by long-time Patricia Field stylist Codie Leone, a prominent New York-based transgender stylist and advocate. In recent years, Mac has developed an impressive portfolio for his custom designs working with a diverse range of clients such as Debbie Harry, Icona Pop, Neon Hitch, and RuPaul's Drag Race winner Sharon Needles. In March 2015, Mac was commissioned by Björk, to create a series of custom latex and silk dresses for her Vulnicura NYC residency.

In 2015, he worked with renowned stylist Arianne Phillips and Live Nation Entertainment to create custom garments for Madonna's Rebel Heart Tour. This included a series of latex bras worn by dancers in the "Holy Water"/Vogue section of the show. His sketch for this project was featured in WWD in September 2015. Later he also collaborated with hip hop rapper Cazwell on a range of form-fitting underwear, based on the colours used in the rapper's 'Ice Cream Truck' video. He also he had previously worked with Sharon Needles on a range of T-shirts and shorts and leggings.

== Media appearances ==
Mac was the subject of the fourth episode of season 16 of America's Next Top Model. For this challenge, the contestants modeled his designs during a runway presentation which featured explosive pyrotechnics lining the catwalk. The episode aired on Wednesday, March 16, 2011 and also featured guest judge photographer/director Francesco Carrozzini.

In 2020, Mac was announced as the winner of season 18 of Project Runway. His "Midnight Rider" collection was featured in the 2021 NYFW.

== Sources ==
- "America's Next Top Model, Cycle 16 - Episode 4 'Francesco Carrozzini/Geoffrey Mac Fashion Show'". Flickr.
- Pierce, Estella (March 16, 2011). "View the Photo Shoot Pictures: America's Next Top Model Cycle 16 Episode 4". Small Screen Scoop.
- Stiffler, Scott (January 18, 2010). "Drag queens and pop divas: blurring the lines". Edge. p. 3.
- "Geoffrey Mac Spring/Summer '12 Collection". Style Pantry. November 11, 2011. Archived from the original on November 14, 2011.
- "Designer talks dressing Debbie Harry". WestWord. December 12, 2013.
- "Huffington Post "Fabrications" Feature". Huffington Post. March 4, 2015.
- "Rebel Heart Tour Sketches". BackStageTales. September 13, 2015.
