= Brandon Maxwell =

American fashion designer (born 1984)

- Born: September 18, 1984 (age 41); Longview, Texas, U.S.
- Education: St. Edward's University (BA)
- Occupations: Fashion designer, television personality, director, photographer
- Years active: 2009–present
- Awards: CFDA Swarovski Award for Womenswear (2016); CFDA Womenswear Designer of the Year (2019)

Brandon Maxwell (born September 18, 1984) is an American fashion designer, television personality, director, and photographer. He is the founder and creative director of Brandon Maxwell, the luxury women's ready-to-wear label.

Maxwell began his career as a fashion stylist and became Lady Gaga's fashion director in 2012 before launching his own label in 2015. He received the CFDA Swarovski Award for Womenswear in 2016 and was named Womenswear Designer of the Year at the 2019 CFDA Fashion Awards. Maxwell was a judge on Project Runway from 2019 to 2023, and since 2021 has been creative director of the Walmart apparel brands Free Assembly and Scoop.

== Early life and education ==
Maxwell was born in Longview, Texas. Maxwell's grandmother, Louise Johnson, was a buyer for a boutique in Longview, and he was introduced to design there at an early age. Growing up, Maxwell would put together outfits and photograph his friends wearing them. For high school, he attended Trinity School of Texas in Longview. In 2002, he moved to New York City to study painting at Marymount Manhattan College before graduating from St. Edward's University in Austin, Texas. Maxwell graduated with a Bachelor of Arts degree in photocommunications. After graduating, Maxwell returned to New York City to begin working.

== Career ==
=== Styling ===
Prior to launching his eponymous womenswear label, Maxwell entered the fashion industry as a stylist. He began assisting Deborah Afshani in 2009, and afterwards worked with Edward Enninful before taking a job with Nicola Formichetti in 2010, through whom he was introduced to Lady Gaga, then Formichetti's client. In 2012, Maxwell took on the role of Lady Gaga's fashion director.

Maxwell has styled for magazines such as Harper's Bazaar, ELLE, V, Teen Vogue, and Porter. He has done ad campaigns for Barneys New York and Uniqlo. The Hollywood Reporter ranked him 13th on its 2016 list of the 25 most powerful stylists in Hollywood. Maxwell has collaborated with photographers such as Mario Testino, Inez & Vinoodh, Paola Kudacki, Giampaolo Sgura, Terry Richardson, and Steven Klein.

=== Brandon Maxwell label ===
In 2015, Maxwell debuted his women's ready-to-wear label, Brandon Maxwell, in New York at Mr. Chow. With a focus on craftsmanship, the entire collection is designed in New York City. Maxwell crafted these garments by draping, rather than sketching, to ensure an ideal fit.

In August 2016, Michelle Obama wore an ivory Brandon Maxwell gown to the White House state dinner for Singaporean prime minister Lee Hsien Loong.

Maxwell revealed his spring 2019 collection, inspired by his fascination with cowboy culture and picturesque landscapes of the American Southwest. Maxwell generated the highest earned media value during New York Fashion Week the week following his show, ahead of Ralph Lauren and Tom Ford.

During a 2018 residency in Marfa, Texas, Maxwell designed a collection conceived as an homage to the state and arranged a corporate donation of educational resources to local schools.

Maxwell showed his fall 2019 collection in New York in February 2019 before an audience of about 200. Pared back after the previous season, it worked in black and white with accents of pink, red, apple green and powder blue, brought sportswear cues such as racer-back shapes and zipper details into his tailoring, and closed with a full-skirted pink gown.

Maxwell designed the fuchsia gown that Lady Gaga, one of the event's co-hosts, wore on arrival at the 2019 Met Gala; she changed into three further looks on the carpet.

Maxwell's clients have included Michelle Obama, Meghan Markle and Karlie Kloss, along with Oprah Winfrey, Blake Lively and Queen Rania of Jordan; the label is sold by upscale retailers internationally.

Maxwell's label marked its tenth anniversary in 2025. Showing his fall 2025 collection that February, he worked with menswear-inspired shirting, tool-belted trousers and leather outerwear, and described the aim as pushing American sportswear forward on his own terms. That August he released his first home collection, a collaboration with Pottery Barn spanning bedding, tableware, lighting and upholstery. The following month he staged an anniversary show in New York for his spring 2026 collection.

=== Photography and direction ===
While attending St. Edward's University, Maxwell met friend and collaborator Jessy Price. Together, Maxwell and Price photographed and directed their first commercial short film together for the Brandon Maxwell Fall/Winter 2016 campaign. The success of the project led them to direct Apple Music's commercial for Lady Gaga's song "A-Yo" from her 2016 album, Joanne. They have continued to direct campaigns for Maxwell's eponymous label that focus on highlighting the featured talent. For fall 2026, Maxwell did not hold a runway show or presentation during New York Fashion Week, presenting the collection instead through a film he made with Price and others.

=== Television ===
Maxwell has appeared as a judge on the 2019 re-launch of Project Runway on Bravo TV. He judged four seasons, remaining on the panel with Nina García and Elaine Welteroth through the all-stars twentieth season, which premiered in June 2023. When the series moved to Freeform for its twenty-first season, it was announced with a new host and a new panel of judges.

=== Walmart ===
In 2021, Maxwell was named Creative Director for two "elevated" fashion brands for Walmart. In this role, Maxwell oversees four seasonal collections annually for the labels Free Assembly and Scoop. He was the first creative director appointed for either label and was also given a role in their marketing campaigns, shaping Walmart's 2021 holiday range before his first full collections arrived in spring 2022; Free Assembly had launched in September 2020, while Scoop was a defunct boutique brand that Walmart revived in 2019. He was still in the role in November 2025, when he marked nearly five years at the two labels. In September 2025 the brands staged a New York Fashion Week pop-up shop in Manhattan.

== Awards and honors ==
Maxwell's first industry recognition came within a year of his label's debut. In January 2016, Fashion Group International named him the winner in the women's ready-to-wear category of its Rising Star Awards, an evening on which the menswear prize was shared by Donrad Duncan and Malan Breton. Later the same year he took the Council of Fashion Designers of America award for emerging talent in womenswear, then presented in partnership with Swarovski, and was named a finalist for the LVMH Prize.

In July 2018, Maxwell was one of four winners of the New York semifinal of the International Woolmark Prize, announced at a lunch in Manhattan alongside the labels Colovos and Albus Lumen and the menswear designer Willy Chavarria. The competition ran three regional semifinals that year rather than the customary six, and the winners advanced to a global final of twelve labels staged in London the following February. Each finalist received A$70,000 toward business development and had seven months to produce a six-look capsule collection in merino wool, competing for a main prize of A$200,000.

Three honors followed in 2019. In February the Texas House of Representatives adopted a resolution congratulating Maxwell after the Texas Cultural Trust named him a Texas Medal of Arts honoree, recognizing both his design work and a donation of educational resources he had arranged for schools in Marfa, Texas. On June 3, at a ceremony at the Brooklyn Museum, he was named Womenswear Designer of the Year at the CFDA Fashion Awards; it was his second award from the organization. In August, Fashion Group International announced that he would receive its Fashion Star Award at that year's Night of Stars, a black-tie dinner held on October 24 at Cipriani Wall Street; the organization's Superstar award went to Rick Owens and its Humanitarian Award to Donna Karan.

The following year Maxwell received the Designer of the Year Award at the 42nd American Image Awards, held in September 2020 as the first virtual edition of the gala. Presented by the American Apparel & Footwear Association as a benefit for the CFDA Foundation and watched by more than 500 invited guests online, the ceremony also honored Ralph Lauren Corp., the Alibaba Group, Kenneth Cole and Bravo's Project Runway. Accepting the award, Maxwell noted that his business had been running for five years.
