= Karlie Kloss =

American fashion model (born 1992)

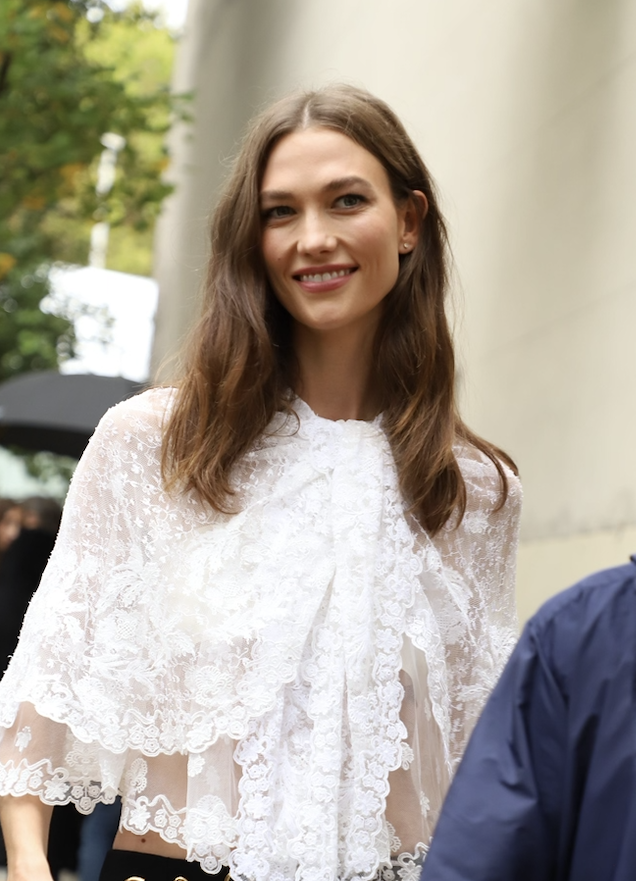
- Kloss in 2026
- Born: Karlie Elizabeth Kloss; August 3, 1992 (age 34); Chicago, Illinois, U.S.
- Education: New York University
- Occupation: Model
- Years active: 2006–present
- Spouse: Joshua Kushner (m. 2018)
- Children: 3
- Modeling information
- Hair color: Brown
- Agency: The Society Management; Models 1 (London); 2pm Model Management (Copenhagen); UTA (Los Angeles)
- Website: www.karliekloss.com

Karlie Elizabeth Kloss (born August 3, 1992) is an American supermodel and entrepreneur. She was a Victoria's Secret Angel from 2013 until 2015, when she enrolled as a student at New York University. By 2019, Kloss had appeared on 40 international Vogue covers. She has signed with several top modeling agencies throughout her career, including Elite Model Management, Next Management, IMG Models, and The Society. From 2019 to 2020, she was the host of the reality competition television series Project Runway.

Apart from modeling, Kloss works to provide reproductive rights for women and supports programs for women in STEM fields. She founded "Kode with Klossy", a nonprofit which provides free coding camps for girls and non-binary teens. In 2022, Kloss launched Gateway Coalition, to provide support to abortion clinics in the Midwestern United States. The following year, she acquired i-D magazine and became its chief executive officer (CEO).

== Early life and education ==
Karlie Elizabeth Kloss was born on August 3, 1992, in Chicago, Illinois to Tracy Kloss (née Fares), a freelance art director, and Kurt Kloss, an emergency physician. She has three sisters: an elder sister, Kristine, and twin younger sisters, Kimberly and Kariann. She moved to St. Louis, Missouri, with her family in 1994. Kloss attended Webster Groves High School in Webster Groves, Missouri, where she was a cheerleader during her freshman year and graduated in 2011. In 2013, the family moved to Goshen, New York to support her modeling career. In September 2015, she enrolled in the Gallatin School of Individualized Study at New York University.

== Modeling career ==
=== 2006–2010: Beginnings and modeling breakthrough ===
Kloss was discovered at a local benefit runway show in 2005. In 2006, at the age of 14, she posed for the photographer David Leslie Anthony in a cover and editorial spread titled "Almost Famous," for the June issue of Scene Magazine. Elite Model Management Chicago (Note: Elite Model Management no longer has a Chicago office. As of 2019, after various business mergers, it is now called Select Model Management Chicago.) forwarded her tear sheets to their New York office, which signed her.

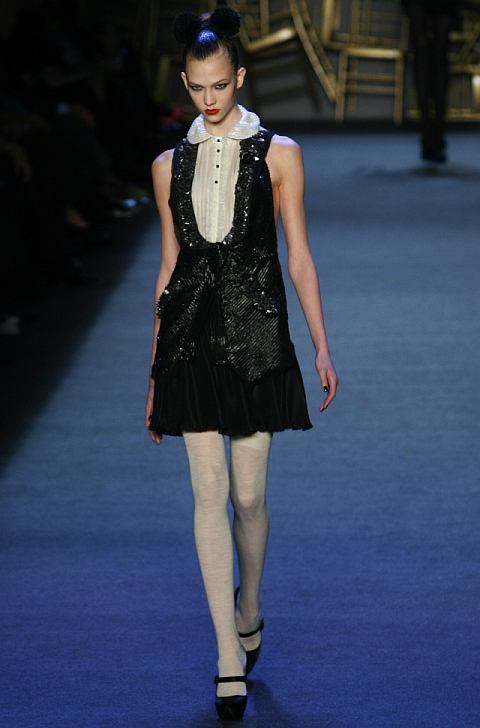
On the runway for Zac Posen, Fall/Winter 2008

One of Kloss's first modeling stints was a shoot for Abercrombie Kids by Bruce Weber. In January 2008, she left Elite Model Management and signed with Next Management. She walked 31 runways in New York Fashion Week, (Note: Sources differ on her first fashion show. Many say it was her Calvin Klein-exclusive show for the Spring/Summer 2008 season, others say it was 3.1 Phillip Lim.) walking as an exclusive for Calvin Klein, closing for Marc Jacobs, opening for Carolina Herrera, and occupying both spots at Doo.Ri. She walked 20 shows in Milan and 13 in Paris for the fall 2008 collections, totaling 64 shows in the 2008 season.

Kloss found herself in a legal dispute when Elite Model Management, believing they were responsible for launching her career, sued Next Management for allegedly stealing her away and offering her 'improper compensation.' The case was eventually settled out of court. After four years of being represented by Next Management, Kloss signed with IMG Models, simultaneously leaving Mother Model Management in St. Louis. In 2009, Vogue Paris named her one of the "top 30 models of the 2000s."

Kloss has appeared in editorials for American and Korean W, American Elle, Allure, i-D, French and Japanese Numéro, Vanity Fair, Dazed & Confused; and American, Australian, Italian, French, British, Korean, German, Japanese, Chinese, Turkish, Portuguese, Teen, and Latin American editions of Vogue magazine. She notably appeared on 12 international Vogue covers, including Vogue Italia, in a five-year span. She appeared on the cover of Teen Vogue alongside Chanel Iman and Ali Michael in February 2008 and by herself in May 2010.

Kloss made her first venture into television when she appeared in the Gossip Girl episode "Belles de Jour" as herself. She became a muse for fashion designer John Galliano and has appeared in his and Dior's campaigns. She opened both the Christian Dior Haute Couture and Dior Resort shows in the Spring/Summer 2010 season. In Spring/Summer 2011, she opened ten shows and closed eight.

=== 2011–2014: Recognition and success ===
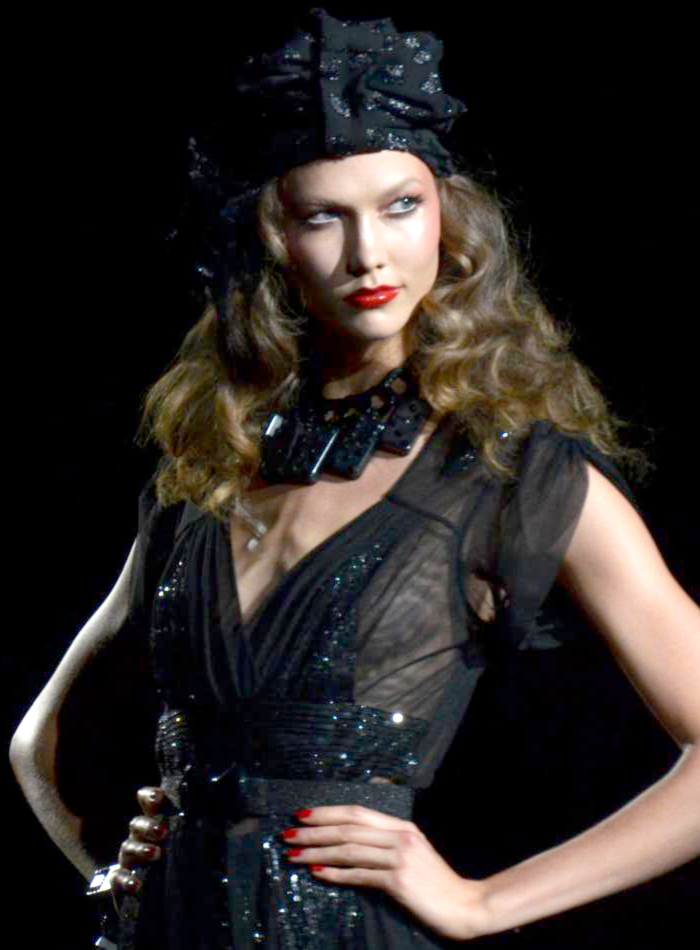
On the runway for Anna Sui, S/S 2012

Kloss renewed her contract with Christian Dior for the third season in a row in 2011. The photographer Gabrielle Revere was commissioned by Life magazine to photograph her for the cover of a special print issue distributed during New York Fashion Week in September 2011. The photo story inside the issue was photographed during the summer of 2011 and shows her at couture shows in Paris, New York City, and her hometown of St. Louis. That fall, she made her debut in the Victoria's Secret Fashion Show.

In 2012, Kloss was featured on the September covers of British Vogue, Japanese Vogue, Harper's Bazaar Russia, and Numéro. She appeared in campaign ads for Juicy Couture, Stefanel, Elie Saab, and Jean Paul Gaultier. She co-hosted the revival of the MTV series House of Style with fellow model Joan Smalls. Just before appearing in the Victoria's Secret Fashion Show in 2012, Kloss had her long hair cut into a bob, which was subsequently called the "Karlie". One of her outfits was cut out of the Victoria's Secret broadcast as it contained a Native American headdress that was deemed offensive.

In 2013, Kloss was the face of Donna Karan, Lacoste, and Lanvin campaigns. Kloss worked with Victoria's Secret on their 2013 summer swimwear video. She was also the red carpet host of the 2013 MTV Movie Awards pre-show. In April, Kloss starred alongside Daria Strokous, Monika Jagaciak, and Iris Strubegger in Louis Vuitton's Alma bag campaign. In 2013, Kloss was named as one of the new ambassadors for Coach, Inc. and starred in the accessory maker's fall 2013 campaign.

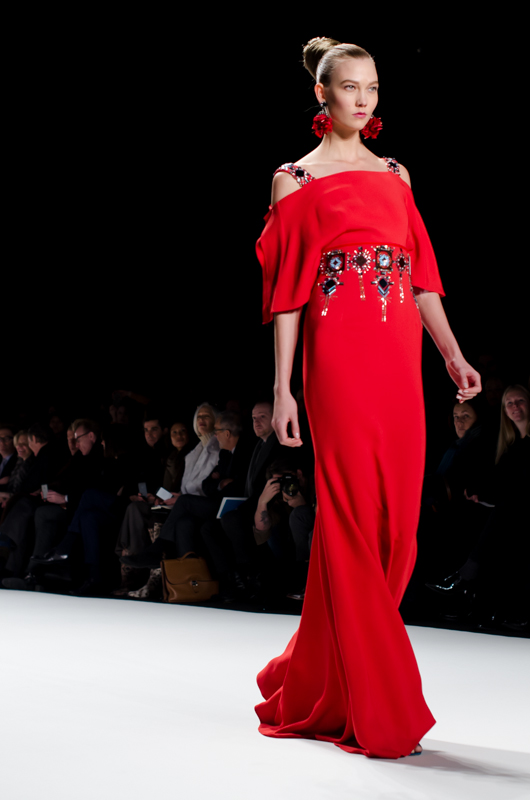
Walking for Carolina Herrera, Fall/Winter 2014

Kloss was the face of Jean Paul Gaultier, Nike, Donna Karan, Lancaster, and the Chanel Coco Noir fragrance campaigns in 2014. She also collaborated with Frame Denim to design the Forever Karlie jeans collection. In summer 2014, Kloss worked with Warby Parker to design the Karlie Kloss x Warby Parker eyewear line, the proceeds of which benefited Edible Schoolyard NYC. In September 2014, L'Oreal Paris announced that they had signed Kloss as their new face. She was featured on the September 2014 cover of American Vogue with Joan Smalls, Cara Delevingne, Arizona Muse, Edie Campbell, Imaan Hammam, Fei Fei Sun, Vanessa Axente, and Andreea Diaconu as "The Instagirls!"

=== 2015–present: After Victoria's Secret ===
In 2015, Kloss left Victoria's Secret. She would go on to cite concerns with their messaging to young women as a motivation for her departure. That year, Kloss appeared on the March cover of American Vogue with singer-songwriter Taylor Swift. She portrayed the role of "Knockout" in the music video for Swift's song "Bad Blood", which premiered at the 2015 Billboard Music Awards. Kloss also featured in several video segments during Swift's 1989 World Tour and appeared live on stage with her at London's Hyde Park on June 27 and at the MetLife Stadium in East Rutherford, New Jersey on July 11. In March 2015, Kloss starred in the music video for Chic's "I'll Be There", directed by Inez van Lamsweerde and Vinoodh Matadin. On July 21, 2015, she started a YouTube channel, Klossy, featuring weekly vlogs and Q&A videos, with help from her close friend, filmmaker Casey Neistat.

In May 2016, Kloss was named the new face of Swarovski for a two-year contract, replacing fellow Victoria's Secret alumna Miranda Kerr. In April 2017, she appeared as a correspondent on the Netflix series Bill Nye Saves the World. Kloss was featured in Vogue's March 2017 issue styled as a geisha and received criticism for cultural appropriation; she posted a public apology for the spread. In Fall 2017, Kloss announced a new TV show, Movie Night with Karlie Kloss, airing on Freeform in winter 2017. On May 24, 2017, Kloss won the Diane von Furstenberg Inspiration Award.

Kloss in Ohio, 2019

In April 2018, Kloss was announced as Estée Lauder's newest global spokesmodel and brand ambassador. In October 2018, Kloss confirmed that she would be stepping into Heidi Klum's shoes on the seventeenth season of Project Runway as the host and executive producer. Of the show, she said, "I could not be more excited to host and produce a series that provides a platform to aspiring American designers as they pursue their creative and entrepreneurial dreams."

Kloss ranks on the "New Supers" and "Money Girl" lists on Models.com. Her runway walk is often described as powerful, distinguished by her height, precision, fluidity, and serious, sultry expression. She has described it as a "moody gait".

== Other ventures ==
In 2012, Kloss collaborated with the restaurant chain Momofuku Milk Bar to create 'Karlie's Kookies,' a special recipe sold at DKNY Soho during Fashion's Night Out in New York City; its proceeds went to FEED Projects where ten meals were donated for every tin of cookies sold. She also led a group of investors in purchasing the fashion magazine W in 2020. That year, Kloss was named a trustee of Barnard College for a four-year term. In November 2023, she acquired British fashion magazine i-D from Vice Media Group and became its CEO. She is also an investor in the probiotics company Seed. In March 2024, she and her husband Joshua Kushner revived Life magazine for print and digital distribution through Bedford Media in partnership with Dotdash Meredith.

=== Computer programming ===
Kloss is also a computer programmer. She studied Ruby on Rails and other web development technologies at Flatiron School in 2014. She later narrated the season 2 episode "Coding" on the Netflix and Vox Media television show Explained in October 2019.

In April 2015, Kloss launched Kode With Klossy, an initiative for teaching girls about computer science, with support from Estée Lauder. She partnered with Flatiron School and Code.org to offer an annual scholarship for young girls interested in computer science and software engineering as part of the initiative. The same year, Kode With Klossy launched its first free two-week summer coding camp for girls aged 13–18. The camp taught the basics of programming languages such as Ruby, JavaScript, and Swift; program participants built fully functional mobile apps or websites with the camp. By 2025, the organization had built a community of almost 11,000 young people in over 100 countries. In December 2025, Kloss announced her debut picture book titled Spaghetti Code: A Story About Problem-Solving, Pasta, and the Power of Big Ideas; the book is inspired by her Kode with Klossy initiative.

=== Reproductive rights ===
In her twenties, Kloss served as a care escort for Planned Parenthood. She founded the Gateway Coalition in 2022 to support Midwestern abortion clinics. In 2024, Kloss worked with Missourians for Constitutional Freedom to pass Amendment 3 and enshrine abortion rights in the state constitution. Kloss authored an op-ed on the topic in The Washington Post, and in support of Florida's Amendment 4 in the Miami Herald.

== Personal life ==
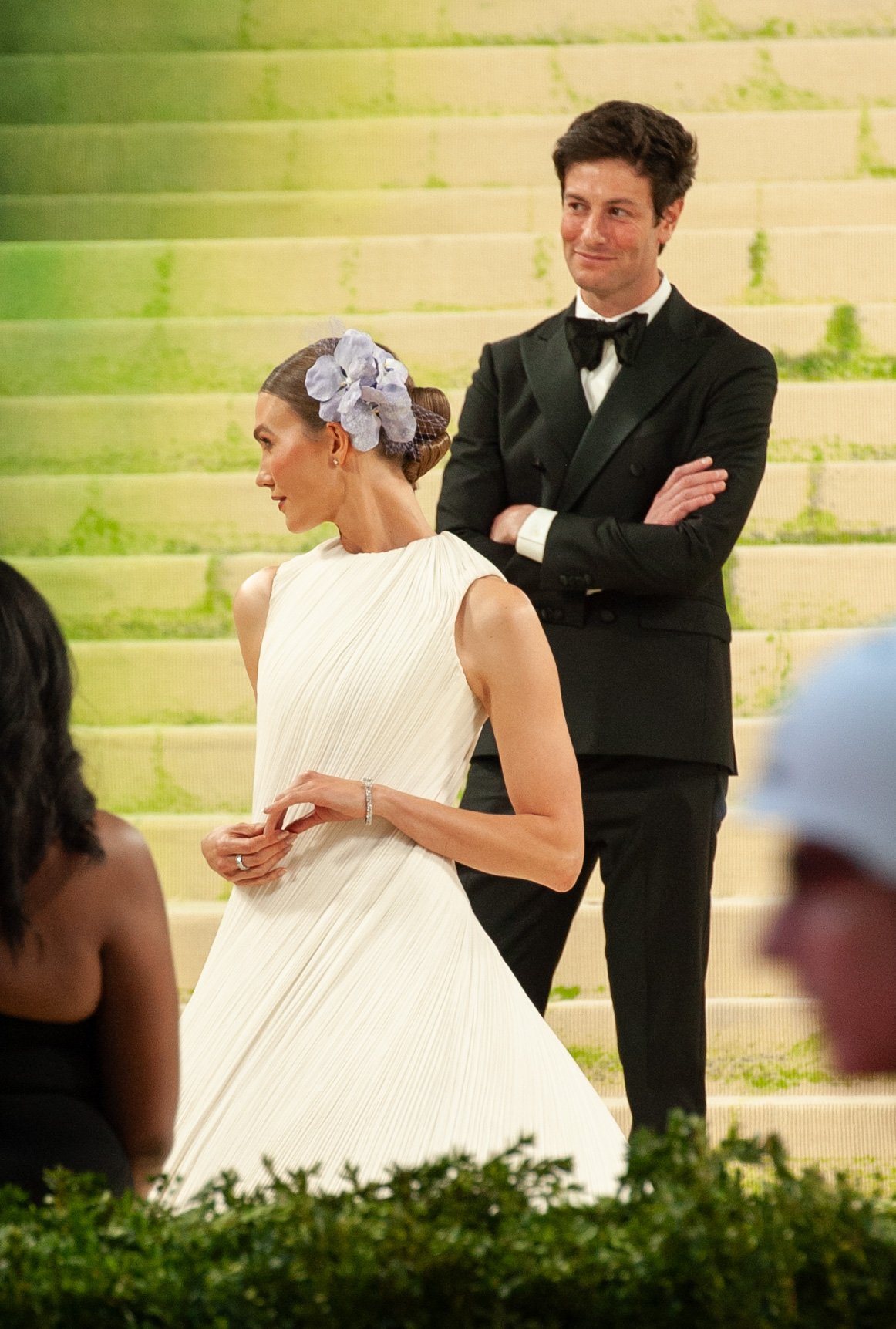
Kloss and Kushner at the 2026 Met Gala

Kloss began dating the businessman and investor Joshua Kushner in 2012. The couple became engaged in July 2018, a month after she converted to Judaism, Kushner's religion, becoming a giyoret. The couple married on October 18, 2018, in upstate New York. In June 2019, they held a second wedding celebration in Wyoming. They have two sons, born in March 2021 and July 2023, and a daughter, born in September 2025.

Kloss is related by marriage to Ivanka Trump, the wife of Kushner's elder brother Jared. She has stated that she finds the Trump family connection "frustrating [...] that the spotlight is always shifted away from [her] career toward [her] relationship". In December 2020, Kloss and Kushner purchased a home in Miami, Florida, for $23.5 million. The pair also bought a 7,200-square-foot (670 m^{2}) penthouse in the Puck Building in Manhattan for $35 million in 2021, and paid $29.5 million for the Wave House in Malibu, California, in August 2024.

Kloss supported Hillary Clinton in the 2016 United States presidential election, Joe Biden in the 2020 election, and Kamala Harris in the 2024 election. She and her husband attended the March for Our Lives event in Washington, D.C., in protest of gun violence in March 2018. She is a feminist and has stated that her decision to leave Victoria's Secret was partly motivated by her feminist beliefs. In 2024, Kloss gathered signatures for a bipartisan effort in Missouri to put an abortion initiative on the ballot for 2024.

== See also ==
- Forbes list of the world's highest-paid models
- Kushner family
