= Elaine Welteroth =

American journalist, author and television host

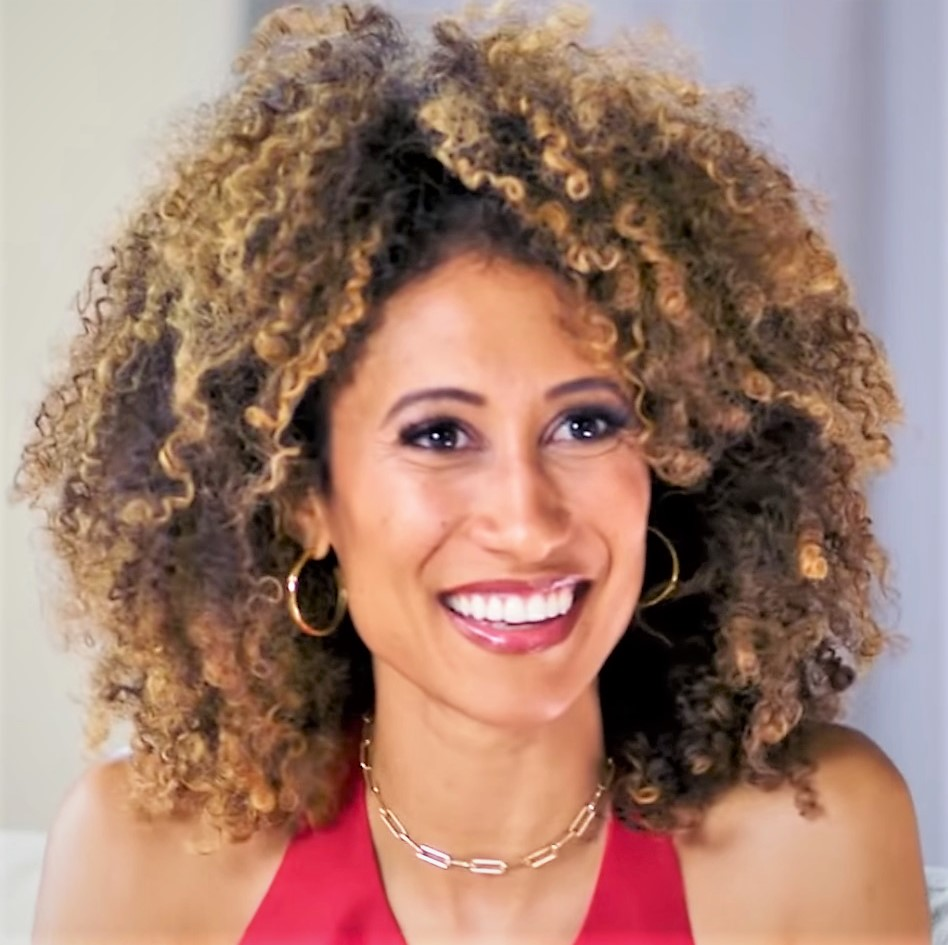
- Welteroth interviewed by Ashley Graham in 2020
- Born: Elaine Marie Welteroth; December 10, 1986 (age 39); Newark, California, U.S.
- Education: California State University-Sacramento
- Occupations: Magazine editor, journalist, television host
- Years active: 2008–present
- Employer: Conde Nast Publications
- Known for: Editor-in-chief, Teen Vogue
- Predecessor: Amy Astley
- Children: 2

Elaine Marie Welteroth (born December 10, 1986) is an American journalist, editor, author, and television host. In April 2016, Welteroth was named editor-in-chief of Teen Vogue, making her the second person of African-American heritage in Condé Nast's 107-year history to hold such a title. Her promotion to editor at age 29 makes her the second youngest editor in Condé Nast history, behind former Teen Vogue EIC Lindsay Peoples Wagner who was 28 when she started in the role in Condé Nast. When she became beauty director of Teen Vogue in 2012, Welteroth was the first person of African-American heritage to serve in the role. She is credited for the notable increase of Teen Vogue coverage of politics and social justice, encouraging readers to become civically engaged, specifically during the 2016 U.S. presidential election. Under Welteroth's leadership of Teen Vogue's shifting format, the magazine developed its first YouTube channel, featuring content on diverse subjects from campus style to cultural appropriation. The final print edition of Teen Vogue was December 2017.

On January 11, 2018, Welteroth resigned from Teen Vogue and moved to California and signed with CAA. In October 2018, Welteroth became a judge on Project Runway as part of the series' return to Bravo. In June 2019 her memoir, More Than Enough: Claiming Space for Who You Are (No Matter What They Say), was published by Viking.

== Early life ==
Welteroth was born in Newark, California. Her father is of German and Irish descent, while her mother is African American. She grew up in Fremont, California and in 2004, she graduated from Newark Memorial High School in Newark, California, where she competed in track and field. In 2007, Welteroth graduated from Sacramento State University, majoring in mass communication/media studies with a minor in journalism.

== Education ==
Elaine Welteroth is a first-generation college student. She graduated with a degree in public relations with a minor in journalism from Sacramento State University.

== Career ==
Welteroth's first job in her hometown was being a mascot for her local Hometown Buffet, wearing a bird suit. She has described the best career advice she's ever received as: "Bite off more than you can chew. And then chew as fast as you can". As a Multicultural Advertising Intern Program (MAIP) Fellow, Welteroth secured an internship at the advertising, marketing, and public relations firm, Ogilvy & Mather, upon graduation from California State University-Sacramento. She then became a content producer for SomaGirls.TV, a digital media company. Welteroth broke into the magazine industry via an unpaid internship at Ebony magazine. In pursuit of the internship, Welteroth wrote Harriette Cole, then editor in chief, a letter asking for an informational interview, sent her an email, and called her assistant numerous times. Cole gave Welteroth the chance to assist with a cover shoot for Serena Williams in Los Angeles. Impressed with Welteroth's professionalism on set, Cole decided to fly her out for an internship with Cole at Ebony; Welteroth then later became Cole's assistant. This next became a permanent position as the magazine's Beauty & Style Editor from 2008 to 2011.

Welteroth joined Condé Nast in September 2011 by becoming the Beauty & Style editor for Glamour magazine in 2011, and then Senior Beauty Editor. She became the Beauty & Health Director at Teen Vogue in October 2012, making her the first African-American to hold this position. In the February 2013 copy of Teen Vogue, her debut issue as Beauty & Health Director, she penned the article "Natural Wonder", where Welteroth encouraged readers to embrace their natural hair texture while also sharing her favorite natural hair products. Welteroth was named editor of Teen Vogue in May 2016, replacing the founding editor-in-chief Amy Astley when Astley left to become editor-in-chief of Architectural Digest. On September 8, 2016, Welteroth was honored at the 2016 Fashion Show & Style Awards through Harlem's Fashion Row, a platform for multicultural fashion designers, as Editor of the Year. In 2016, Welteroth was named number 47 on The Root's list of 100 influential African-Americans. Condé Nast officially named Welteroth editor-in-chief of Teen Vogue on April 29, 2017. In 2017, Girls Write Now, a non-profit mentorship program based in New York City which encourages at-risk girls to find their voices through writing, named her an honoree for their May 23 annual awards ceremony.

In 2020, Welteroth was named to the Ebony Power 100 List.

On 1 December 2020, Welteroth was confirmed to be replacing Eve on the daytime talk show, The Talk. Nine months later, it was revealed that Welteroth would no longer be on the show.

Elain Welteroth was formerly associated to Aurora James's 15 Percent Pledge. Welteroth hosts a vodcast, Build to Last, to highlight and uplift Black influencers, their contribution and experiences.

In December 2023, Welteroth launched a fundraiser on Instagram to help one family afford midwifery care during pregnancy, following her own transformative experience giving birth at Kindred Space LA, a Black-owned birthing center. The initial campaign surpassed its goal and funded care for two families, prompting Welteroth to formally establish birthFUND in April 2024.

birthFUND is a philanthropic initiative that seeks to increase access to midwifery care and raise awareness about its benefits, particularly for Black women and other underserved communities. The organization partners with Birth Center Equity and the Victoria Project to identify trusted midwifery-care providers, who in turn help connect eligible families to grant funding. As of January 2025, birthFUND had supported 53 families and welcomed the birth of 26 babies.

The organization is funded by contributions from individual donors, corporate sponsors, and founding family funders, including Serena Williams, John Legend, and Chrissy Teigen. Its mission, according to Welteroth, is to promote joyful, informed, and community-centered birth experiences outside traditional hospital settings.

Welteroth has cited systemic inequities in maternal health care—and particularly the high maternal mortality rates for Black women in the United States—as a driving force behind birthFUND. She describes the project as a continuation of her broader career focus on equity, representation, and structural change.

=== Social media influence ===
Via Instagram, Welteroth quickly developed her brand and Teen Vogue's brand by posting behind the scenes photos and videos of photoshoots, her personal photos, and selfies with celebrities. In 2014, as Teen Vogue's beauty and health director, she was invited by Target to update a Fashion Week Instagram Diary of her experience being backstage at the New York and London Fashion Weeks. Her social media also broadcasts her own accomplishments and Teen Vogue's accomplishments, by sharing personal footage from her personal and professional life at least once or twice a day.

=== Influence on Teen Vogue ===
Welteroth expanded the magazine's focus and received recognition for the noticeable increase of content in Teen Vogue on politics and social justice, including critical coverage of the 2016 U.S. presidential election. Welteroth's first issue to print as editor of Teen Vogue had Willow Smith as the cover model and featured headlines like "Cultural Appreciation: Real Girls, Real Beauty, Real Talk". The December 2016 cover featured actresses and feminists, Rowan Blanchard and Yara Shahidi on the "Smart Girls" issue. Welteroth also invited Blanchard and Shahidi to serve as guest editors, the first ever in the history of the publication. She also kicked off the "Teen Vogue Book Club" with Blanchard and Shahidi selecting their favorite book, Their Eyes Were Watching God by Zora Neale Hurston. Blanchard, Shahidi, and Welteroth used Teen Vogue's Facebook account to live stream a discussion about the book in November 2016, allowing the magazine's target audience to engage with political texts by black women that have shaped the continued work of scholar-activists. The December 2016 issue also featured a conversation between American actress Zendaya Coleman and former First Lady of the United States Michelle Obama on the worldwide education of girls.

This new direction for the magazine emphasizes digital publication, and the print magazine publication schedule was changed from 10 issues per year, in a small format, to becoming a quarterly publication, in a larger, thicker format. Teen Vogue developed a YouTube https://youtube.com/@TeenVogue channel which, as of 2023, has 2 Million subscribers an increase from March 2017, which had over 500,00 subscribers and over 800 pieces of original content, for instance "A Fact Check on Trump's First Speech to Congress", uploaded March 1, 2017. The video allows viewers to recap former president Donald Trump's speech to Congress.

On December 7, 2016, Teen Vogue made an appearance on the award-winning ABC sitcom Black-ish. In the episode "Nothing, but Nepotism", Welteroth plays herself as editor of Teen Vogue while Black-ish character Zoe gets the opportunity to intern at Teen Vogue to boost her high school resume by using her advertising executive father's professional connections. The episode resulted in discussions on nepotism in the black community, such as the article, "On black nepotism and this week's epic 'black-ish' & 'Teen Vogue' crossover" by Blavity writer Trey Mangum. During the advance screening of the episode and discussion, Welteroth raised the question, "Is black nepotism just leveling the playing field?"

At Slate, Mark Joseph Stern credited Welteroth for developing Teen Vogue into a publication that "treats teenagers like rounded human beings with agency and intellect". Stern continues with, "The result is a teen glossy with seriously good political coverage and legal analysis, an outlet for teenagers who—shockingly! can think about fashion and current events simultaneously."

Feminist writer Lara Witt praised Teen Vogue in the article, "Vogue Magazine Has A Race Problem, And It's Getting Tired", featured on Wear Your Voice. Witt stated, "Rather than participating in the blatant erasure of people of color and our cultures, Vogue’s younger sibling has included features celebrating indigenous, South Asian, East Asian, black, and Muslim teens. Thanks to their radical push to be unafraid to represent more than just white, heterosexual, cisgender women, Teen Vogue is providing more readers with representation."

=== Public speaking ===
During the 2015 New York Fashion Week, Welteroth facilitated a discussion about diversity in fashion, beauty standards, and cultural appropriation with former model turned fashion activist, Bethann Hardison, at "The Future of Fashion Talk Series," sponsored by HQ Events. Welteroth speaks at varying conferences like the 2017 PATH 40-year celebration and the 2017 Women of Power Summit through Black Enterprise magazine. During these conferences, she has spoken on topics ranging from integrative technology and global health to activism and culture.

== Personal life ==
In December 2016, Welteroth became engaged to musician Jonathan Singletary and was married in May 2020. The wedding took place in their street and followed strict social distancing laws set out as a result of COVID-19. The two originally met as children while they attended the same church. They have two children together. She also provided backing vocals for Singletary's song, "Don't Fight Alone".

== Recognition ==
She was recognized as one of the BBC's 100 women of 2017.

== Works ==
- More Than Enough: Claiming Space for Who You Are New York: Viking, 2019. ISBN 9780525561583, OCLC 1103468376

Media offices
Preceded by Eve	The Talk co-host 2021	Succeeded by Akbar Gbaja-Biamila
