= Project Runway season 21 =

2025 season of television series

Project Runway
- Season 21
- Promotional poster for season twenty-one
- Judges: Heidi Klum; Nina García; Law Roach
- No. of contestants: 12
- Winner: Veejay Floresca
- Runners-up: Ethan Mundt; Jesus Estrada
- No. of episodes: 10

Release
- Original network: Freeform
- Original release: July 31 – September 25, 2025

Season chronology
- ← Previous; Season 20 Next → Season 22

The twenty-first season of the American reality competition series Project Runway premiered on July 31 and concluded on September 25, 2025. It marked the first season to air through cable network Freeform, departing from its previous run on Bravo since its 2004 debut. The season featured twelve contestants competing in garment design challenges, with participants eliminated throughout the competition based on judges' critiques until a winner was determined.

After initially departing in season sixteen (2017), German model Heidi Klum reprised her role as head judge alongside Colombian journalist Nina García returning, with stylist Law Roach joining the judging panel for the first time. Christian Siriano (winner of season four) also came back as a mentor for the designer contestants. Michael Kors returned as a guest judge for the season finale. Former contestants Jesus Estrada (of season seven) and Caycee Black (of season nineteen) returned to compete again.

Veejay Floresca became the first transgender woman to be announced as the winner of a season. She received a cash prize of $200,000, a six-month representation from Agentry PR, a mentorship with the Council of Fashion Designers of America (CFDA), and a magazine spread in the American edition of Elle. Jesus Estrada and Ethan Mundt ultimately finished as runners-up. After concluding its season finale, the series was later renewed for a twenty-second season by Disney Television Group.

== Development ==
During the bankruptcy of the Weinstein Company, the series was considered an asset which was later reacquired from entertainment conglomerate NBCUniversal in 2018. They soon rebooted Project Runway and returned to their previous cable network Bravo, starting with its seventeenth season (2019). Coincidentally the former host and mentor, German model Heidi Klum and television personality Tim Gunn, left the series after both signed a project deal for production company Amazon MGM Studios.

After its twentieth season concluding in 2023, it was uncertain if the series would be renewed for a twenty-first season. Later it was speculated that its release window would take place in 2025. The Hollywood Reporter first reported that cable network Freeform renewed the series and closed a distribution deal on October 17, 2024. It is co-produced by Alfred Street Industries and Spyglass Media Group for a ten-episode run premiering the next year. South African film producer Gary Barber, with Dan Cutforth, Jane Lipsitz, Nan Strait, and Dan Volpe are served as executive producers.

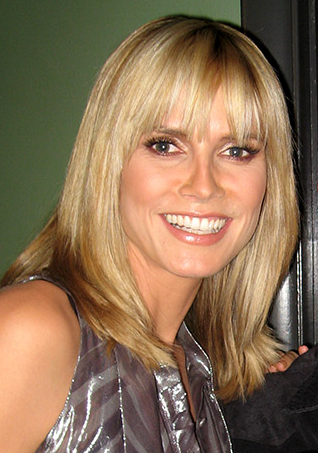
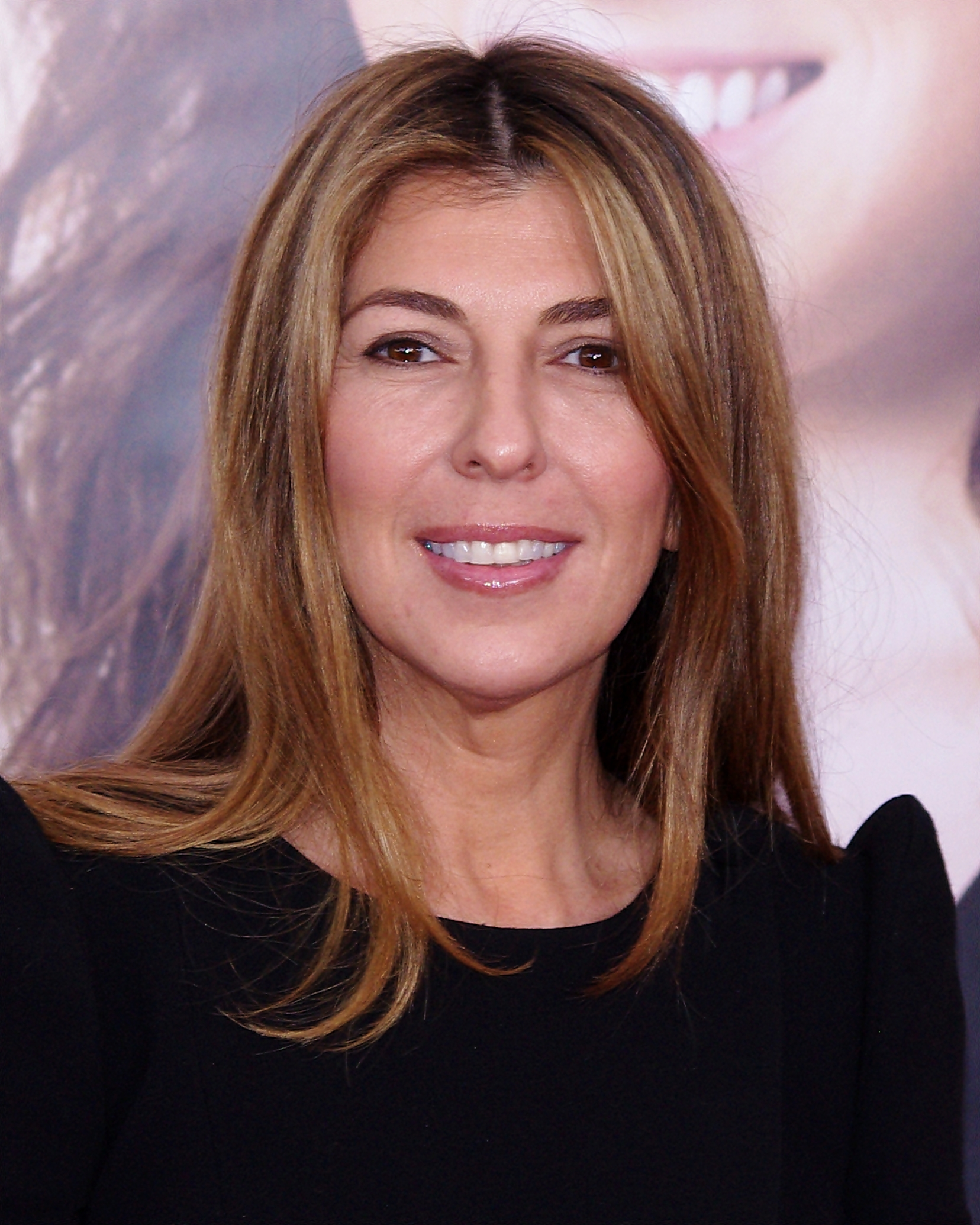
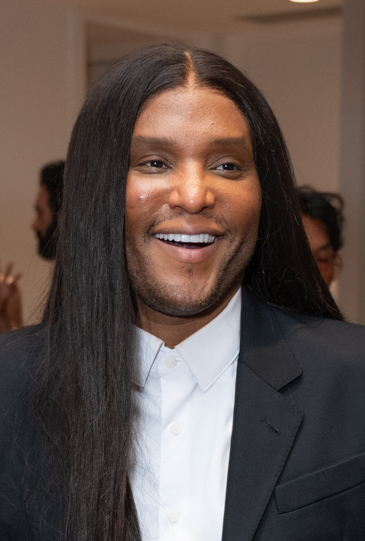
Heidi Klum, Nina García, and Law Roach (left to right) announced as judges for season 21

People confirmed that Klum will return for its forthcoming season, after departing from the series since season sixteen (2017) on January 3, 2025. Former mentor Gunn felt "devastated, then kind of humiliated" for being excluded in returning, explaining to People, "I thought, how lucky am I to have had the experiences that I've had over the last 20 years? [...] I've come to terms with it. Am I disappointed? Sure. And most of all, it's about not working with Heidi, but we move on and [...] I don't know what the reason is yet, but it will be revealed."

The rest of the judges panel for Project Runway was revamped and announced to the public on March 24, 2025. This included Colombian journalist and permanent judge Nina García returning, with stylist Law Roach joining alongside. Fashion designer Christian Siriano, who won in season four (2007), returned as a mentor for the designer contestants.

== Marketing ==
A first-look teaser was later released on May 19, which featured Klum dressed in a peach-colored gown. As she centered herself in a Colosseum-like structure, Klum shouts out, "I'm back! And it's good to be home." It showed the season premiere date being on July 31 for Freeform, ending the teaser with, "Get in, or you're out."

Eleven guest judges and twelve contestants were revealed on June 11, set to appear in the upcoming season. Jesus Estrada and Caycee Black returned to compete again, alongside Veejay Floresca who competed in the Philippine iteration (2008) of the franchise. A promotional trailer for the season was released on July 1, showcasing the workshop, runway scenes, the main stage, and confessionals. Within nine days of its release, it gave momentum for the series approximately receiving 42 million views across social media platforms, reported by Deadline Hollywood for Freeform.

To further promote the series, Roach and Siriano appeared on televised program Good Morning America (GMA), where they had three contestants design and create an outfit dedicated to caffeinated beverages on July 17. Belania Daley won the challenge with Klum wearing the garment for GMA on August 6. The judges have also promoted the series on various media such as Nightline, The View, and Entertainment Weekly.

Celebrity guests or judges are listed in chronological order:

Episode 2

- Alycia Scott, actress and producer
- Sara Foster, actress and producer

Episode 3

- Sofía Vergara, actress and television personality

Episode 4

- Lisa Ann Walter, actress and comedian
- Chris Perfetti, actor

Episode 5

- Jenna Lyons, fashion designer and businesswoman

Episode 6

- Christian Cowan, fashion designer
- Joan Smalls, model and television personality

Episode 7

- Zac Posen, fashion designer
- Mickey Guyton, singer and actress

Episode 8

- Nikki Glaser, actress and comedian
- Harris Reed, fashion designer

Episode 9

- Cynthia Erivo, actress and singer
- Ariana Grande, actress and singer
- Paul Tazewell, costume designer
- Tyra Banks, model and television personality

Episode 10

- Michael Kors, fashion designer

== Contestants ==
Project Runway season 21 contestants and their backgrounds (Note: All ages, names, with hometowns, and outcome are stated at time of filming.)
Contestant	Age	Hometown	Finish	Outcome
Caycee Black (Note: Caycee Black previously competed on season nineteen, placing sixteenth.)	44	Houston, Texas	Episode 1	12th place
Alex Foxworth	32	Greensboro, North Carolina	Episode 2	11th place
Angelo Rosa	35	Providence, Rhode Island	Episode 3	10th place
Joseph McRae	33	Charlotte, North Carolina	Episode 4	9th place
Madeline Malenfant	30	Nantucket, Massachusetts	Episode 5	8th place
Joan Madison	60	New York City, New York	Episode 6	7th place
Yuchen Han	30	Xining, China	Episode 7	6th place
Belania Daley	34	Long Island, New York	Episode 9	4th place
Antonio Estrada	36	Mazatlán, Mexico	Episode 9	4th place
Jesus Estrada (Note: Jesus Estrada previously competed on season seven, placing thirteenth.)	36	Mazatlán, Mexico	Episode 10	Runners-up
Ethan Mundt	30	Utica, Minnesota	Episode 10	Runners-up
Veejay Floresca (Note: Veejay Floresca previously competed on the Philippine iteration, placing third.)	39	Pasay, Philippines	Episode 10	Winner

== Progress ==
Legend:

WIN indicates that the contestant won the challenge.
HIGH indicates that the contestant had one of the highest score in the challenge, but did not win it.
IN indicates that the contestant was declared safe.
SAVE indicates that the contestant was saved after being eliminated.
LOW indicates that the contestant had one of the lowest score in the challenge, but was not eliminated.
OUT indicates that the contestant was eliminated.

Contestant progress with placements in each episode
Contestant	Episode									
Contestant	1	2	3	4	5	6	7	8	9	10
Veejay	IN	LOW	IN	HIGH	WIN	IN	LOW	HIGH	IN	Winner
Ethan	WIN	IN	LOW	HIGH	HIGH	IN	LOW	HIGH	WIN	Runner-up
Jesus	HIGH	WIN	HIGH	IN	HIGH	IN	WIN	SAVE	HIGH	Runner-up
Antonio	LOW	IN	HIGH	LOW	LOW	HIGH	HIGH	WIN	OUT	Guest
Belania	IN	HIGH	WIN	IN	LOW	WIN	HIGH	SAVE	OUT	Guest
Yuchen	HIGH	IN	IN	WIN	IN	LOW	OUT			Guest
Joan	IN	IN	LOW	LOW	IN	OUT				Guest
Madeline	IN	IN	IN	IN	OUT					
Joseph	LOW	HIGH	IN	OUT						Guest
Angelo	IN	LOW	OUT							Guest
Alex	IN	OUT								Guest
Caycee	OUT									Guest

== Episodes ==
No. overall	No. in season	Title	Original release date	U.S. viewers (millions)
252	1	"New House / New Rules"	July 31, 2025	0.288
Twelve contestants enter the workroom where they are greeted by Heidi Klum and Christian Siriano and where it is announced that the competition will be divided into two fashion houses. They were instructed to create a collection inspired by either princesses or villains originated from Disney.: House of Princesses: Antonio, Belania, Caycee, Joan, Joseph, and Madeline; House of Villains: Alex, Angelo, Ethan, Jesus, Veejay, and Yuchen; The runway took place at the United Palace in New York City where the House of Villains was revealed to be the winning group of the week. The panel of judges announced that Jesus and Yuchen had one of the highest scores but remained safe, with Ethan winning the challenge. Antonio and Joseph of the House of Princesses soon received negative critiques with Caycee later eliminated, having the outcome in twelfth place.: Guest Judge: Christian Siriano; Runway Theme: Princesses vs. Villains; Challenge Winner: Ethan; Eliminated: Caycee
253	2	"Feel the Burn"	July 31, 2025	0.248
Eleven contestants remained in the workroom with Siriano announcing they will continue to compete in groups; he gave Ethan the opportunity to swap a designer from a fashion house in the next challenge. Siriano revealed both houses needs to create a cohesive activewear collection.: House of Burn: Alex, Angelo, Ethan, Madeline, Veejay, and Yuchen; House of Lotus: Antonio, Belania, Jesus, Joan, and Joseph; After the runway, the House of Lotus were announced as the winning group for the week with Belania and Joseph having one of the highest scores but remained safe; they revealed Jesus won the challenge. The panel of judges soon tallied their score with Angelo and Veejay being the lowest for the House of Burn, with Alex later eliminated, having the outcome in eleventh place.: Special Guest: Alycia Scott; Guest Judge: Sara Foster; Runway Theme: Workout to Weekend; Challenge Winner: Jesus; Eliminated: Alex
254	3	"Boring to Brilliant"	August 7, 2025	0.281
Ten contestants remained in the workroom.: House of Ethan: Angelo, Ethan, Joan, Joseph, and Yuchen; House of Jesus: Antonio, Belania, Jesus, Madeline, and Veejay; After the runway, the House of Jesus were declared as the winning group of the week from the judges, making Belania the winner of the challenge; Antonio and Jesus had the highest scores but remained safe. As for the other house, Ethan and Joan soon received negative critiques with Angelo later eliminated, having the outcome in tenth place.: Guest Judges: Sofia Vergara and Sara Foster; Runway Theme: Making Boring Brilliant; Challenge Winner: Belania; Eliminated: Angelo
255	4	"Sew Elementary"	August 14, 2025	0.306
Special Guests: Lisa Ann Walter and Chris Perfetti; Runway Theme: Unconventional Materials; Challenge Winner: Yuchen; Eliminated: Joseph
256	5	"Complimentary Couture"	August 21, 2025	0.234
Guest Judge: Jenna Lyons; Runway Theme: Companion Piece to Unconventional; Challenge Winner: Veejay; Eliminated: Madeline
257	6	"Hit the Streets"	August 28, 2025	0.263
Guest Judge: Christian Cowan and Joan Smalls; Runway Theme: Elevated Streetwear; Challenge Winner: Belania; Eliminated: Joan
258	7	"Runway Rodeo"	September 4, 2025	0.193
Guest Judge: Mickey Guyton and Zac Posen; Runway Theme: Western Chic; Challenge Winner: Jesus; Eliminated: Yuchen
259	8	"Threads of Confidence"	September 11, 2025	0.266
Guest Judge: Nikki Glaser and Harris Reed; Runway Theme: Out on the Town; Challenge Winner: Antonio; Eliminated: None
260	9	"Something Wicked"	September 18, 2025	0.244
Guest Judge: Tyra Banks; Runway Theme: Wickedly Avant-garde; Challenge Winner: Ethan; Eliminated: Belania and Antonio
261	10	"See You on the Runway"	September 25, 2025	0.201
Guest Judge: Michael Kors; Runway Theme: 5-piece mini collection; Winner of Project Runway season 21: Veejay Floresca; Runner-ups: Jesus Estrada and Ethan Mundt

== Broadcast ==
The twenty-first season premiered two episodes through Freeform at 9:00 p.m. (EST) on July 31, 2025. It also was released throughout various streaming services such as Crave for Canada simultaneously, alongside Disney+ and Hulu for the United States with next-day availability starting on August 1. Subsequently, the series moved its new time slot to 10:00 p.m next week on August 7.

== Reception ==
Media outlets praised the series for returning, alongside Klum, but also criticized it when they learned Gunn was not involved this season. He revealed that an executive producer offered him a cameo appearance, but he declined, as it was not reasonable to return for a short time, which upset many fans of the franchise.

After showcasing their contestants, Ethan Mundt was quickly well-received by various publications, as he also appeared on another television series titled RuPaul's Drag Race (2021).

Veejay Floresca was announced as the winner of Project Runway, becoming the first openly transgender woman to be a winner within the franchise. For her prize package, she received a cash reward of $200,000, a six-month representation from Agentry PR, a mentorship with the Council of Fashion Designers of America (CFDA), and a magazine spread in the American edition of Elle.

The series was renewed for its twenty-second season by Disney Television Group on October 21, 2025. The current judging panel and mentor will return and serve as executive producers.
