= Project Runway All Stars season 1 =

Project Runway All Stars
- Season 1
- Hosted by: Angela Lindvall
- Judges: Georgina Chapman; Isaac Mizrahi
- No. of tasks: 12
- No. of contestants: 13
- Winner: Mondo Guerra
- No. of episodes: 12

Release
- Original network: Lifetime
- Original release: January 5 – March 22, 2012

Season chronology
- Next → Season 2

Project Runway All Stars (season 1) is the first season of the Project Runway spin-off series Project Runway All Stars. It features 13 designers from seasons 1–8 of the original series with a new host, new judges and a new mentor. It premiered on Lifetime on January 5, 2012.

== Judges ==
Model Angela Lindvall serves as the host as well as a judge. Designers Isaac Mizrahi and Georgina Chapman are the other recurring judges. Marie Claire Editor-in-Chief Joanna Coles mentors the veteran designers. Guest judges include fashion designer Diane von Fürstenberg, fictional character Miss Piggy, singer-actress Sutton Foster, model Miranda Kerr, and musician and producer Pharrell Williams. Lead makeup artist for the show is Scott Patric, and lead hairstylist is Linh Nguyen.

== Contestants ==
Contestant	Hometown	Original season	Original placement	Outcome
Elisa Jimenez	New York, New York	Season 4	10th place	13th place
Kathleen "Sweet P" Vaughn	Pasadena, California	Season 4	5th place	12th place
Gordana Gehlhausen	San Diego, California	Season 6	4th place	11th place
April Johnston	Savannah, Georgia	Season 8	5th place	10th place
Anthony Williams	Atlanta, Georgia	Season 7	5th place	9th place
Rami Kashou	Los Angeles, California	Season 4	Runner-up	8th place
Kara Janx	New York, New York	Season 2	4th place	7th place
Mila Hermanovski	Los Angeles, California	Season 7	3rd place	6th place
Jerell Scott	New York, New York	Season 5	4th place	5th place
Kenley Collins	New York, New York	Season 5	3rd place	4th place
Michael Costello	Palm Springs, California	Season 8	4th place	3rd place
Austin Scarlett	New York, New York	Season 1	4th place	Runner-up
Mondo Guerra	Denver, Colorado	Season 8	Runner-up	Winner

=== Designer progress ===
Elimination Chart
Designers	1	2	3	4	5	6	7	8	9	10	12	Eliminated Episode
Mondo	HIGH	IN	IN	HIGH	WIN	LOW	WIN	WIN	HIGH	WIN	WINNER	12 - Finale, Part 2
Austin	IN	WIN	LOW	IN	HIGH	LOW	HIGH	LOW	WIN	HIGH	RUNNER-UP	12 - Finale, Part 2
Michael	IN	HIGH	WIN	WIN	LOW	LOW	HIGH	HIGH	LOW	LOW	3RD PLACE	12 - Finale, Part 2
Kenley	IN	IN	HIGH	IN	IN	HIGH	LOW	HIGH	HIGH	OUT		10 - Let's Get Down to Business
Jerell	HIGH	IN	IN	IN	LOW	WIN	IN	LOW	OUT			9 - When I Get My Dress In Lights
Mila	IN	IN	LOW	HIGH	IN	HIGH	LOW	OUT				8 - O! Say, Can You Sew?
Kara	IN	LOW	IN	LOW	IN	HIGH	OUT					7 - Puttin' on the Glitz
Rami	WIN	IN	HIGH	IN	HIGH	OUT						6 - Fashion Face-Off
Anthony	IN	HIGH	IN	LOW	OUT							5 - Clothes Off Your Back
April	IN	LOW	IN	OUT								4 - Good Taste Tastes Good
Gordana	LOW	IN	OUT									3 - Patterning for Piggy
Sweet P	LOW	OUT										2 - A Night at the Opera
Elisa	OUT											1 - Return to the Runway

The designer won Project Runway All Stars Season 1.
The designer won the challenge.
The designer was in the top two, or the first announced into the top 3, but did not win.
The designer had one of the highest scores for that challenge, but did not win.
The designer had one of the lowest scores for that challenge, but was not eliminated.
The designer was in the bottom two, but was not eliminated.
The designer lost and was out of the competition.

Models

- Jessamine Kelley
- Taylor Dean McCausland
- Alejandra Leslie Mancia
- Elaina Williams
- Karli Babcock
- Halie Noel
- Rae Hight
- Lindley Jones
- Tatjana Sinkevica
- Brittany Bass
- Eden Viza
- Kelly Dahlen
- Kelly Brown

== Rate The Runway Results ==
Designer Elimination Table
Designer	1	2	3	4	5	6	7	8	9	10	11
Mondo	HIGH	IN	IN	HIGH	WIN	LOW	WIN	WIN	HIGH	WIN	WINNER
Austin	IN	WIN	LOW	IN	HIGH	LOW	HIGH	LOW	WIN	HIGH	OUT
Michael	IN	HIGH	WIN	WIN	LOW	IN	HIGH	HIGH	LOW	LOW	OUT
Kenley	IN	IN	HIGH	IN	IN	IN	LOW	HIGH	HIGH	OUT	
Jerell	HIGH	IN	IN	IN	LOW	WIN	IN	LOW	OUT		
Mila	IN	IN	LOW	LOW	IN	IN	LOW	OUT			
Kara	IN	LOW	IN	LOW	IN	IN	OUT				
Rami	WIN	IN	HIGH	IN	HIGH	OUT					
Anthony	IN	HIGH	IN	HIGH	OUT						
April	IN	LOW	IN	OUT							
Gordana	LOW	IN	OUT								
Sweet P	LOW	OUT									
Elisa	OUT										

== Episodes ==
=== Episode 1: Return to the Runway ===
Original Airdate: January 5, 2012

- Designers are to create an outfit based on a look they showed earlier in the episode. The materials are purchased from a 99 cent store.
- Guest Judge: Ken Downing
- Winner: Rami
- Eliminated Elisa

=== Episode 2: A Night at the Opera ===
Original Airdate: January 12, 2012

- The all-star fashion aces race against time to spin out elegant ball gowns for a night at the opera.
- Guest Judges: Mark Badgley and James Mischka of Badgley Mischka
- Winner: Austin
- Eliminated: Sweet P

=== Episode 3: Patterning for Piggy ===
Original Airdate: January 19, 2012

- The designers are asked to design a flamboyant cocktail dress for Miss Piggy.
- Guest Judges: Miss Piggy and Eric Daman (sitting in for Isaac Mizrahi )
- Winner: Michael
- Eliminated: Gordana

=== Episode 4: Good Taste Tastes Good ===
Original Airdate: January 26, 2012

- The designers were given only 6 hours, the shortest time in PR history, to design an outfit for Australian supermodel Miranda Kerr. The outfit was to be inspired by a flavor of gelato. As the winner of the last challenge, Michael had the privilege of selecting his flavor first. Note that in March 2006, Kerr was an unnamed model for Daniel Vosovic's 12-piece finale collection. In addition, she was a guest judge on the fourth season of Project Runway Australia.

Designer	Flavor Of Gelato
Mondo	Cantaloupe
Anthony	Green Tea
Kenley	Passion Fruit
Rami	Kiwi
Mila	Milk & Sour Cherries
Jerell	Fruits Of The Forest
Kara	Chocolate With Cayenne Pepper
Michael	Grapefruit
April	Blueberry
Austin	Vanilla Madagascar

- Guest Judges: Diane von Fürstenberg and Miranda Kerr
- Winner: Michael
- Eliminated: April

=== Episode 5: Clothes Off Your Back ===
Original Airdate: February 2, 2012

- The All Stars take to the streets of New York to convince total strangers to part with their clothes in the name of fashion. The muses' outfits are ripped apart and reborn in the hands of the designers.
- Guest Judge: Sean Avery
- Winner: Mondo
- Eliminated: Anthony

=== Episode 6: Fashion Face-Off ===
Original Airdate: February 9, 2012

- Each designer picked a bag; in the bag was a luggage tag with a season on it. The designers were told to create "sportwear for a weekend getaway look", and the designers with the same seasons were pitted against each other.

Season	High Scoring Designer	Low Scoring Designer
Spring	Kara	Austin
Summer	Kenley	Mondo
Fall	Mila	Rami
Winter	Jerell	Michael

- Guest Judge: Cynthia Rowley
- Winner: Jerell
- Eliminated: Rami

=== Episode 7: Puttin' on the Glitz ===
Original Airdate: February 16, 2012

- The designers head to Broadway and design an outfit for an actress in the musical Godspell, who is portrayed as a rich girl.
- Guest Judges: Sutton Foster
- Winner: Mondo
- Eliminated: Kara

=== Episode 8: O! Say, Can You Sew? ===
Original Airdate: February 23, 2012

- The designers head to the United Nations Headquarters and were asked to design dresses that were inspired by the flags and culture of the country they chose.
  - Austin - Seychelles
  - Jerell - India
  - Kenley - Chile
  - Michael - Greece
  - Mila - Papua New Guinea
  - Mondo - Jamaica
- Guest Judge: Catherine Malandrino
- Winner: Mondo
- Eliminated: Mila

=== Episode 9: When I Get My Dress In Lights ===
Original Airdate: March 1, 2012

- Designers created avant-garde outfits using lighting technology. The runway was also lit by blacklight to add an extra touch to the show. The winning design was featured in one of Pharrell Williams' productions.
- Guest Judge : Pharrell Williams
- Winner: Austin
- Eliminated: Jerell

=== Episode 10: Let's Get Down To Business ===
Original Airdate: March 8, 2012

- The designers must create a look that can be manufactured and sold for a certain price point.
- Guest Judge: Nanette Lepore
- Winner: Mondo
- Eliminated: Kenley

=== Episode 11: Finale, Part 1 ===
Original Airdate: March 15, 2012

- The final three designers have four days to create a mini collection.

To be continued...

=== Episode 12: Finale, Part 2 ===
Original Airdate: March 22, 2012

- Guest Judge: Tommy Hilfiger and Ken Downing
- Winner: Mondo
- Eliminated: Austin (Runner-up) and Michael (3rd Place)
