= Project Runway season 8 =

Project Runway
- Season 8
- Region 1 DVD cover
- No. of tasks: 12
- No. of contestants: 17
- Winner: Gretchen Jones
- No. of episodes: 14

Release
- Original network: Lifetime
- Original release: July 29 – October 28, 2010

Season chronology
- ← Previous; Season 7 Next → Season 9

The eighth season of the television show Project Runway began airing on July 29, 2010, on the Lifetime. After Lifetime cancelled the accompanying series Models of the Runway, Project Runway episodes were extended to 90 minutes in Season 8. This was the first season that episodes were longer than an hour with commercials.

The season included 17 designers at the beginning of the competition. Returning as judges were supermodel Heidi Klum; fashion designer Michael Kors; and Marie Claire fashion director, Nina Garcia. Tim Gunn returned as the workroom mentor to the aspiring designers. Designer Gretchen Jones was the season's winner.

April Johnson, Michael Costello and Mondo Guerra later appeared in the first season of Project Runway All Stars in 2012, with April receiving 10th Place, Michael 3rd, and Mondo winning the competition. Peach Carr, Carlos Casanova and Ivy Higa in the same year, competed in the second season of the All Stars edition placing 13th, 7th and 5th respectively. Ari South (known as Andy on season 8 before transitioning) competed in the third season in 2013, where she was eliminated first, placing 11th. Valerie Mayen competed in the fifth season in 2016, placing 9th. Casanova and South would go on to participate again in the sixth season of All Stars in 2018, with Casanova placing 16th of 16, while South placed 14th.

== Contestants ==
Tim Gunn, Heidi Klum, and season 8 contestants

Contestant	Age	Hometown	Finish	Outcome
McKell Maddox	29	Layton, UT	Episode 1	17th place
Jason Troisi	33	Greenwich, CT	Episode 2	15th place
Nicholas D'Aurizio	32	New York, NY	Episode 2	15th place
Sarah Trost	27	Toluca Lake, CA	Episode 3	14th place
Kristin Haskins Simms	39	Philadelphia, PA	Episode 4	13th place
A.J. Thouvenot	26	St. Charles, MO	Episode 5	12th place
Peach Carr	50	Lake Forest, IL	Episode 6	11th place
Carlos Casanova	33	Astoria, NY	Episode 7	10th place
Michael Drummond	31	St. Louis, MO	Episode 8	9th place
Ivy Higa	30	New York, NY	Episode 9	8th place
Valerie Mayen	29	Cleveland, OH	Episode 10	7th place
Christopher Collins	30	San Francisco, CA	Episode 11	6th place
April Johnston	21	Savannah, GA	Episode 12	5th place
Michael Costello	27	Palm Springs, CA	Episode 13	4th place
Andy South	23	Waianae, HI	Episode 14	3rd place
Mondo Guerra	32	Denver, CO	Episode 14	Runner-up
Gretchen Jones	28	Portland, OR	Episode 14	Winner

=== Models ===
Models	Place Finished
Vanessa Ratnavich	17th
Dre Davis	16th
Julia Rodriguez	15th
Samantha Zajarias	14th
Kaven Jo Caven	13th
Amare Tk	12th
Ify Jones	11th
Sarae Cart	10th
Zhanna Ved	9th
Ekaterina Py	8th
Alexandra Palmer	7th
Eyen Chorm	6th
Rose Cook	5th
Cassie Dzienny	4th
Lenka Dayrit	3rd
Tina Marie Clark	2nd
Millana Snow	Winner

== Challenges ==
Designer Elimination Table
Designers	1^{1}	2	3	4	5	6	7	8	9	10^{2}	11	12	13	14	Eliminated Episode
Gretchen	WIN	WIN	HIGH	IN	LOW	IN	IN	IN	HIGH	IN	LOW	LOW	ADV	WINNER	14 - Finale, Part 2
Mondo	IN	HIGH	IN	IN	HIGH	HIGH	LOW	WIN	WIN	WIN	HIGH	HIGH	ADV	RUNNER-UP	14 - Finale, Part 2
Andy	IN	IN	WIN	IN	LOW	IN	HIGH	LOW	HIGH	LOW	WIN	HIGH	ADV	3RD PLACE	14 - Finale, Part 2
Michael C.	IN	IN	IN	WIN	LOW	WIN	IN	IN	LOW	IN	LOW	WIN	OUT		13 - Finale, Part 1
April	LOW	IN	IN	LOW	HIGH	IN	WIN	IN	IN	HIGH	HIGH	OUT			12 - We're in a New York State of Mind
Christopher	IN	IN	IN	LOW	LOW	HIGH	IN	HIGH	IN	LOW	OUT				11 - A Look in the Line
Valerie	IN	HIGH	HIGH	HIGH	HIGH	LOW	IN	LOW	LOW	OUT					10 - There's a Pattern Here
Ivy	LOW	IN	IN	IN	LOW	IN	LOW	HIGH	OUT						9 - Race to the Finish
Michael D.	IN	IN	IN	HIGH	HIGH	LOW	HIGH	OUT							8 - A Rough Day on the Runway
Casanova	LOW	IN	LOW	IN	WIN	IN	OUT								7 - What's Mine is Yours
Peach	IN	LOW	IN	IN	HIGH	OUT									6 - You Can Totally Wear That Again
AJ	IN	IN	LOW	IN	OUT										5 - There IS an 'I' in Team
Kristin	IN	IN	IN	OUT											4 - Hats Off to You
Sarah	IN	IN	OUT												3 - It's a Party
Nicholas	LOW	OUT													2 - Larger Than Life
Jason	LOW	OUT													2 - Larger Than Life
McKell	OUT														1 - And Sew It Begins

The designer won Project Runway Season 8.
The designer won the challenge.
The designer was in the top two, but did not win.
The designer had one of the highest scores for that challenge, but did not win.
The designer had one of the lowest scores for that challenge, but was not eliminated.
The designer was in the bottom two, but was not eliminated.
The designer lost and was out of the competition.

- ^Note 1: This episode was unusual in that there was only 1 high look and 6 bottom looks, instead of 3 high and 3 low.
- ^Note 2: This episode only Mondo's and April's looks were the clear high looks from the judges, Michael C and Gretchen, were considered only fine but not judged really as a high or low.

Model Elimination Table
Model	1	2	3	4	5	6^{1}	7	8	9	10	11 ^{2}	12	13	14
Millana	AJ	AJ	AJ	AJ	AJ	–	CC	AJ	AJ	AJ	GJ	GJ	GJ	WINNER (GJ)
Tina Marie	VM	VM	VM	VM	VM	–	AS	VM	VM	VM	MG	MG	MG	MG
Lenka	MC	MC	MC	MC	MC	–	MG	MC	MC	MC	AS	AS	AS	AS
Cassie	AS	AS	AS	AS	AS	–	VM	AS	AS	AS	MC	MC	MC	OUT
Rose	CC	CC	CC	CC	CC	–	AJ	CC	CC	CC	AJ	AJ	OUT	
Eyen	MG	MG	MG	MG	MG	–	MC	MG	MG	MG	CC	OUT		
Alexandra	GJ	GJ	GJ	GJ	GJ	–	CA	GJ	GJ	GJ	WD			
Ekaterina	IH	IH	IH	IH	IH	–	MD	IH	IH	OUT				
Zhanna	MD	MD	MD	MD	MD	–	IH	MD	OUT					
Sarae	CA	CA	CA	CA	CA	–	GJ	OUT						
Ify	PC	PC	PC	PC	PC	–	OUT							
Amare	AT	AT	AT	AT	AT	–	OUT							
Kaven	KS	KS	KS	KS	OUT									
Samantha	ST	ST	ST	OUT										
Julia	ND	ND	OUT											
Dre	JT	JT	OUT											
Vanessa	MM	OUT												

The model won Project Runway Season 8.
The model wore the winning design that challenge.
The model wore the losing design that challenge.
The model was eliminated.
The model withdrew from the competition

^1: The models were not used in Episode 6.
^2: Alexandra was chosen by Christopher, but then withdrew from the competition because of a family crisis and Eyen was brought back.

Designer legend

- A.J. Thouvenot: AT
- April Johnston: AJ
- Andy South: AS
- Carlos Casanova: CA
- Christopher Collins: CC
- Gretchen Jones: GJ
- Ivy Higa: IH
- Jason Troisi: JT
- Kristin Haskins Simms: KS
- Nicholas D'Aurizio: ND
- McKell Maddox: MM
- Michael Costello.: MC
- Michael Drummond.: MD
- Mondo Guerra: MG
- Peach Carr: PC
- Sarah Trost: ST
- Valerie Mayen: VM

== Episodes ==
No.	Title	judges	Guest judge	Winner	Original release date	Eliminated
1	"And Sew It Begins"	Heidi Klum, Nina Garcia, Michael Kors	Selma Blair	Gretchen	July 29, 2010	McKell
As the season begins and the designers arrive to New York, they are informed that they are not yet part of season 8. For the final stage of their casting session, they are asked to take an article of clothing from their suitcase and incorporate it into their final design. But as Heidi Klum and Tim Gunn stand before the designers (who were all lined up in a straight line), they tell each of them to pass their article of clothing to the designer standing to their right. After collecting their garments, the designers go off to Parson's School of Design to complete their first runway show.
2	"Larger Than Life"	Heidi Klum, Nina Garcia, Michael Kors	Joanna Coles	Gretchen	August 5, 2010	Jason and Nicholas
The designers meet Marie Claire magazine's editor-in-chief, Joanna Coles, and are asked to design a look that epitomizes the Marie Claire woman. The winner's look will be displayed on a billboard in Times Square. As part of the process, each designer and model was taken to a photo shoot to have their look photographed to get a feel of what it would look like in print. Gretchen's winning design was modeled by Coco Rocha for the finished billboard.
3	"It's a Party"	Heidi Klum, Nina Garcia, Michael Kors	Betsey Johnson	Ari	August 12, 2010	Sarah
The designers are asked to create a look made from materials found at Party Glitters, a party supply store in New York City. Toward the end of the challenge, they must also make an accessory using additional party materials. Some time after the runway show and elimination, Ivy passed out and was taken to the emergency room by ambulance.
4	"Hats Off to You"	Heidi Klum, Nina Garcia, Michael Kors	Philip Treacy	Michael C.	August 19, 2010	Kristin
The designers must create outfits to pair with a unique, avant-garde Philip Treacy hat. The models are each randomly assigned a hat, and the designers can select their model based on the hat she has.
5	"There IS an 'I' in Team"	Heidi Klum, Nina Garcia, Michael Kors	Georgina Chapman	Casanova	August 26, 2010	A.J
The designers are split into two teams of six, and each team is asked to design a six-piece collection for Fall 2010. Each team must select one concept and one textile of choice for their inspiration, and are given $1,000 to shop at Mood and one day to complete the challenge.: Concept / Textile / Team members (Note: Team members are listed in the order chosen. Michael C. is chosen first for his team because of his win the previous week. April is selected randomly. Each team member selects the next member.); Military / Lace / April, Mondo, Michael D., Valerie, Casanova, Peach; Menswear / Camel / Michael C., Gretchen, Christopher, Ari, Ivy, AJ; On the runway, Team Military and Lace is declared the winning team. The judges declared the pieces made by Casanova and Peach as their favorites. Heidi polled the six designers on that team, asking who should win; both Casanova and Peach receive mentions. Team "Luxe" (Menswear and Camel) is declared the losing team. When asked who should be sent home, the designers focus on Michael C., who is immune from elimination because he won the previous challenge. When Heidi asks who from among the five non-immune designers should be sent home, while Gretchen, Ari, Ivy, and Christopher all named Michael C., AJ names himself, saying that he did not bring his "fun and unusual style" to the collection. The judges note that Gretchen contradicted herself in front of them, first saying she and the rest of the team stood behind their collection, then later saying it was "crappy" after the judges expressed dissatisfaction. After A.J. is eliminated, Tim Gunn expresses his anger at Team Luxe's behavior on the runway, criticizing the team for "allowing Gretchen to manipulate, control, and bully" them.
6	"You Can Totally Wear That Again"	Heidi Klum, Nina Garcia, Michael Kors	Cynthia Rowley	Michael C	September 2, 2010	Peach
Working with real women who were bridesmaids as models for this challenge, the designers must transform their models' bridesmaids dresses into wearable fashion. Prior to the runway show, a public showcase of the designs is held at which participants can vote for their favorite designs. Mondo's garment receives the most votes. Gretchen and Ivy again criticize Michael C., with Ivy claiming that Michael C. told guests not to vote for Ivy's garment.
7	"What's Mine Is Yours"	Heidi Klum, Nina Garcia, Michael Kors	Kristen Bell	April	September 9, 2010	Casanova
While on a boat ride with Michael Kors on the East River, the designers receive their next challenge: to create a fashionable resort-wear look in one day. After sketching their designs and shopping for fabric, they are told that they will actually be working in randomly selected teams of two, with each designer executing their teammate's design.
8	"A Rough Day on the Runway"	Heidi Klum, Nina Garcia, Michael Kors	January Jones	Mondo	September 16, 2010	Michael D.
The designers are told to design a look that is their own take on classic American sportswear using the style of Jacqueline Kennedy as inspiration. After they have nearly finished their garment, they are told they have an additional day to work to create a companion outerwear item.
9	"Race to the Finish"	Heidi Klum, Nina Garcia, Michael Kors	Naeem Khan	Mondo	September 23, 2010	Ivy
The designers must create a high fashion look for a L'Oréal advertorial, using one of the L'Oréal eye shadow finishes as an inspiration. Halfway through the challenge, they are told they must also create a companion ready-to-wear look. The winner receives $20,000. This is the first time in the history of Project Runway that the winner of a challenge has received a cash prize.: Designer / Eye shadow finish; Mondo / Bright; Christopher / Crystal; April / Matte; Michael C. / Metallic; Ivy / Bright; Valerie / Crystal; Gretchen / Velvet; Ari / Metallic
10	"There's a Pattern Here"	Heidi Klum, Nina Garcia, Michael Kors	Rachel Roy	Mondo	September 30, 2010	Valerie
The designers are tasked with designing their own textile and garment inspired by a memorable time in their lives. The challenge is interrupted when the designers' loved ones make a surprise visit and work is suspended for the rest of the day. The episode is best remembered for Mondo as he struggles with a secret he has been keeping for 10 years — that he is HIV positive — which he incorporates into his design and reveals during the runway show.
11	"A Look in the Line"	Heidi Klum, Nina Garcia, Michael Kors	Norma Kamali	Ari	October 7, 2010	Christopher
The six remaining contestants are given two days to design a look for Heidi Klum's New Balance activewear line. The winning look will be sold on Amazon.com. On the first day, however, Heidi increases the number of looks to three, and the six most recently eliminated contestants are brought back to help the designers. Ivy accuses Michael C. of cheating on a previous challenge; Tim Gunn dispels the accusations. After the runway show, Heidi announces that all three of Ari’s looks will be produced and sold, not just one as previously announced.
12	"We're in a New York State of Mind"	Heidi Klum, Nina Garcia, Michael Kors	Christian Siriano	Michael C., Mondo, Andy, Gretchen	October 14, 2010	April
New York City Mayor Michael Bloomberg gives the remaining five contestants the challenge of creating a look inspired by the city. Four designers will prepare their line for Mercedes-Benz Fashion Week and return to New York where three of the designers will compete as Project Runway finalists.: Designer / Inspiration from New York City; Ari / Central Park; April / Brooklyn Bridge; Gretchen / Lower East Side; Michael C. / Statue of Liberty; Mondo / Brooklyn Bridge
13	"Finale, Part 1"	Heidi Klum, Nina Garcia, Michael Kors	None	Mondo, Gretchen, Ari	October 21, 2010	Michael C.
The four remaining designers are given six weeks and $9,000 to prepare a 10-piece collection. After one month, Tim Gunn visits each designer to check on their progress. When the designers return to New York, they are given two days to create one additional look to show as part of a mini collection consisting of that look and two of their existing pieces. Three designers are chosen to continue and display their entire collection at Fashion Week.
14	"Finale, Part 2"	Heidi Klum, Nina Garcia, Michael Kors	Jessica Simpson	Gretchen	October 28, 2010	Ari, Mondo
The final three designers show their collections on the runway at New York Fashion Week and the winner is announced. The winner was one of the most controversial decisions in Project Runway history. The judges were split, Nina and Michael pushed for Gretchen, while Heidi and Jessica favored Mondo. Even mentor Tim Gunn was enlisted to help break the tie in favor of Mondo. In the end, the power of Michael and Nina would prevail.
