= Project Runway All Stars season 2 =

Project Runway All Stars
- Season 2
- Hosted by: Carolyn Murphy
- Judges: Georgina Chapman; Isaac Mizrahi
- No. of tasks: 12
- No. of contestants: 13
- Winner: Anthony Ryan Auld
- No. of episodes: 12

Release
- Original network: Lifetime
- Original release: October 25, 2012 – January 17, 2013

Season chronology
- ← Previous; Season 1 Next → Season 3

Project Runway All Stars (Season 2) is the second season of the Project Runway spin-off series Project Runway All Stars. It featured 13 designers from seasons 1-9 of the original series with a new host, Carolyn Murphy. The judges, Georgina Chapman and Isaac Mizrahi as well as mentor, Joanna Coles, returned. The season premiered on Lifetime on October 25, 2012.

Guest judges include Kylie Minogue, Katie Holmes, Stacy Keibler, Liv Tyler, and Gretchen Mol as well as renowned fashion designers Diane von Fürstenberg, Jason Wu, Margherita Missoni, Charlotte Ronson, Rafe Totengco, and Elie Tahari, in addition to fashion blogger Tavi Gevinson. Cameo appearances included Karl Lagerfeld and the House of Valentino.

The winner of this season was given the privilege of designing a custom-branded capsule collection for Nine West, receive $150,000 in cash, a sewing and embroidery studio provided by Brother Sewing and Embroidery, an all-expenses paid trip around the world to attend fashion weeks in famous cities such as Paris, Milan, London, and Tokyo, courtesy of Laura Mercier, a technology suite provided by HP and Intel, a fashion spread in Marie Claire magazine, and a position with the publication of the aforementioned magazine as Contributing Editor for one year.

== Judges ==
American model and actress Carolyn Murphy serves as the host as well as a judge. Designers Isaac Mizrahi and Georgina Chapman also judge the returning designers. Marie Claire editor-in-chief Joanna Coles mentored the veteran designers.

== Contestants ==
Contestant	Hometown	Original season(s)	Original placement(s)	Finish	Outcome
Peach Carr	Lake Forest, Illinois	Season 8	11	Episode 1	13
Wendy Pepper	Middleburg, Virginia	Season 1	3	Episode 2	12
Stephen "Suede" Baum	Barryville, New York	Season 5	5	Episode 3	11
Andrae Gonzalo	New York, New York	Season 2	6	Episode 4	10
Kayne Gillaspie	Nashville, Tennessee	Season 3	5	Episode 5	9
Althea Harper	New Haven, Connecticut	Season 6	2	Episode 6	8
Carlos Casanova	New York, New York, NY	Season 8	10	Episode 7	7
Laura Kathleen Planck	St. Louis, Missouri	Season 9	5	Episode 8	6
Ivy Higa	New York, New York	Season 8	8	Episode 9	5
Joshua McKinley	New York, New York	Season 9	2	Episode 11	4
Uli Herzner	Miami, Florida	Season 3	2	Episode 12	3
Emilio Sosa	New York, New York	Season 7	2	Episode 12	2
Anthony Ryan Auld	Baton Rouge, Louisiana	Season 9	7	Episode 12	1

== Designer Progress ==
Designer Elimination Table
Designers	1	2	3	4	5	6	7	8	9	10	11	12	Eliminated Episode
Anthony Ryan	WIN	IN	HIGH	WIN	HIGH	HIGH	HIGH	WIN	WIN	LOW	WIN	WINNER	12 - Finale: Go Big Or Go Home
Emilio	IN	IN	WIN	HIGH	WIN	LOW	IN	HIGH	LOW	LOW	HIGH	RUNNER-UP	12 - Finale: Go Big Or Go Home
Uli	IN	WIN	IN	IN	HIGH	HIGH	WIN	HIGH	HIGH	HIGH	LOW	3RD PLACE	12 - Finale: Go Big Or Go Home
Joshua	IN	IN	IN	LOW	IN	IN	LOW	LOW	LOW	WIN	OUT		11- Couture de France
Ivy	HIGH	HIGH	HIGH	IN	IN	LOW	LOW	LOW	OUT				9 - There's No Business Like Sew Business
Laura Kathleen	IN	IN	LOW	HIGH	LOW	WIN	HIGH	OUT					8 - Flapper Fashion Face-Off
Casanova	HIGH	HIGH	IN	IN	LOW	IN	OUT						7 - An Unconventional Nightmare Before Christmas
Althea	IN	IN	IN	LOW	IN	OUT							6 - Green Dress for the Red Carpet
Kayne	IN	LOW	LOW	IN	OUT								5 - You've Got Male
Andrae	LOW	LOW	IN	OUT									4 - Made in the USA Today
Suede	LOW	IN	OUT										3 - Up Your Aerosol
Wendy	IN	OUT											2 - Put On Your Dancing Shoes
Peach	OUT												1 - Redemption on the Runway

The designer won Project Runway All Stars Season 2.
The designer won the challenge.
The designer came in second but did not win the challenge.
The designer had one of the highest scores for the challenge but did not win.
The designer had one of the lowest scores for the challenge but was not eliminated.
The designer was in the bottom two but was not eliminated.
The designer lost the challenge and was eliminated from the competition.

Models

- Kelly Jesionowski
- Aminat Ayinde
- Tsubasa Watanabe
- Elyce Cole
- Jenn Kosinski
- Kiara Ridgell
- Sam Taylor
- Marleis Pfeifhofer
- Elena Greenwell
- Katya Tolstova
- Ashley Johnson
- Scarlett Shoeffling
- Brittany Mason
- Kelley Lynch

== Rate The Runway Results ==
Designer Elimination Table
Designer	1	2	3	4	5	6	7	8	9	10	11	12
Anthony Ryan	WIN	IN	HIGH	WIN	HIGH	HIGH	HIGH	WIN	WIN	LOW	WIN	WINNER
Emilio	IN	IN	WIN	HIGH	WIN	LOW	IN	HIGH	LOW	LOW	HIGH	3RD PLACE
Uli	IN	WIN	IN	IN	HIGH	HIGH	WIN	HIGH	HIGH	HIGH	LOW	RUNNER-UP
Joshua	IN	IN	IN	LOW	IN	IN	LOW	LOW	LOW	WIN	OUT	
Ivy	HIGH	HIGH	HIGH	IN	IN	LOW	LOW	LOW	OUT			
Laura Kathleen	IN	IN	LOW	HIGH	LOW	WIN	HIGH	OUT				
Casanova	HIGH	HIGH	IN	IN	LOW	IN	OUT					
Althea	IN	IN	IN	LOW	IN	OUT						
Kayne	IN	LOW	LOW	IN	OUT							
Andrae	LOW	LOW	IN	OUT								
Suede	LOW	IN	OUT									
Wendy	IN	OUT										
Peach	OUT											

== Episodes ==
=== Episode 1: Redemption on the Runway ===
Original airdate: October 25, 2012

The designers are split into two teams, and are tasked with creating collections inspired by a word selected from a board; one team chooses "Confident" as their inspiration, while the other team chooses "Bold." Team "Confident" wins the challenge, which means that the loser will be from Team "Bold." Laura Kathleen, a member of Team "Bold", is told that she had the strongest design on the losing team, and had Team "Bold" beaten Team "Confident" she might have been the winner of the challenge.

Attitude	Team Members (in the order of being chosen)
Confident	Kayne, Uli, Casanova, Ivy, Althea, Anthony Ryan, Wendy
Bold	Joshua, Peach, Laura, Emilio, Andrae, Suede

- Guest Judges: Rachel Roy & Mondo Guerra

WINNER: Anthony Ryan
ELIMINATED: Peach

=== Episode 2: Put On Your Dancing Shoes ===
Original airdate: November 1, 2012

The designers arrive at the Nine West showroom in Manhattan, where they each are given the opportunity to select a shoe from the upcoming collection to serve as their aesthetic starting point for the challenge, which is revealed to be creating a glamorous look for a night out on the town, inspired by the concept of "Disco".

- Guest Judge: Rafe Totengco

WINNER: Uli
ELIMINATED: Wendy

=== Episode 3: Up Your Aerosol ===
Original airdate: November 8, 2012

The designers are challenged to create "wearable art" using graffiti art as an inspiration. They are given a chance to create their own print with crate of spray paint, and 7 yards of a choice of cotton or chiffon fabric.

- Guest Judges: Jeffrey Costello & Robert Tagliapietra

WINNER: Emilio
ELIMINATED: Suede

=== Episode 4: Made in the USA Today ===
Original airdate: November 15, 2012

With the first ever interactive challenge, the designers are instructed to choose a picture submitted via Twitter by a Project Runway fan as inspiration for a dress. Many viewers came from all different places of the world. The winning designer & look would be featured in an editorial issue of USA Today.

- Guest Judges: Tavi Gevinson & Charlotte Ronson

WINNER: Anthony Ryan
ELIMINATED: Andrae

=== Episode 5: You've Got Male ===
Original airdate: November 29, 2012

The designers are instructed to create an avant-garde androgynous look for their models. The day after, they are surprised with male models and are given an extra day to create a second look for the male model. The judges compare the looks side by side as they walk down the Runway together.

- Guest Judges: Jason Wu & Robert Rodriguez

WINNER: Emilio
ELIMINATED: Kayne

=== Episode 6: Green Dress for the Red Carpet ===
Original airdate: December 6, 2012

The designers are brought to "The High Line" and are given the task to create an evening gown using Green Fabrics with prints or solid colors that were given to them. After selecting their fabrics, the designers are then allowed to use extra accessories or trimmings that were used by the designers in past challenges. The winning design is to be worn by Carolyn Murphy at a Red Carpet event.

- Guest Judge: Diane von Fürstenberg

WINNER: Laura Kathleen
ELIMINATED: Althea

=== Episode 7: An Unconventional Nightmare before Christmas ===
Original airdate: December 13, 2012

The seven still-standing designers take on an unconventional challenge of creating a look from items found in a Christmas novelty store, with the added twist that the dress cannot look like something inspired by or relating to Christmas.

- Guest Judges: Kylie Minogue & La La Anthony

WINNER: Uli
ELIMINATED: Casanova

=== Episode 8: Flapper Fashion Face-Off ===
Original airdate: December 20, 2012

The six remaining designers are challenged in a "Fashion Face Off" to design an outfit modernizing the Roaring 20's. The designers go head to head against each other in teams of two.

**Anthony Ryan** vs. Ivy	Laura Kathleen vs. **Uli**	**Emilio** vs. Joshua

Winning Designers in bold.

Note: Although Emilio's design was named the winning design of his and Joshua's challenge, the judges also considered Joshua's work very good, and therefore didn't consider him for elimination. Conversely, although Emilio had the high score between him and Joshua, his design wasn't considered quite as good as Anthony Ryan's or Uli's, and the judges agreed during their deliberation that he was not the winner. Ivy makes history in Project Runway by surviving three consecutive Bottom Two appearances.

- Guest Judges: Gretchen Mol & Jenny Packham

WINNER: Anthony Ryan
ELIMINATED: Laura Kathleen

=== Episode 9: There's No Business Like Sew Business ===
Original airdate: December 27, 2012

The five remaining All Stars must create a ready to wear look while also meeting a retail budget of $500–$700. The winning design would be displayed in the store windows of Elie Tahari & manufactured and sold, with profits going to Save the Garment Center.

- Guest Judges: Elie Tahari & Stacy Keibler

WINNER: Anthony Ryan
ELIMINATED: Ivy

=== Episode 10: All Stars and Stripes ===
Original airdate: January 3, 2013

The Project Runway designers pay their tribute to the armed forces! The four remaining designers are paired with four female veterans from an array of different military branches. The designers will have to battle it out to see who can create a design that best suits each veteran for each of the special events they are attending.

- Guest Judges: Katie Holmes & Carmen Marc Valvo

WINNER: Joshua
ELIMINATED: None

=== Episode 11: Couture de France ===
Original airdate: January 10, 2013

In a franchise first, the designers traveled to Paris, France, where they spent a day sketching at the Eiffel Tower and toured the Valentino atelier and showrooms. They were also invited to a private preview of Valentine's couture show by creative directors Maria Grazia Chiuri and Pier Paolo Piccioli. Upon returning to New York City, the remaining contestants were tasked with creating a high-fashion couture gown to secure a spot in the finale.

- Guest Judge: Cynthia Rowley

WINNER: Anthony Ryan
ELIMINATED: Joshua

=== Episode 12: Finale: Go Big Or Go Home ===
Original airdate: January 17, 2013

The three remaining designers compete in the final for a chance to win a grand prize! However, because this is All Stars, the final three designers only get four days and an hour and a half at Mood, to complete a full mini collection. With the help of previously eliminated designers, the final three duke it out and give it all they've got to prove who Project Runway's true All Star is.

- Guest Judges: Liv Tyler & Margherita Missoni

WINNER: Anthony Ryan
ELIMINATED: Emilio & Uli
