= Inglot Cosmetics =

Polish cosmetics company

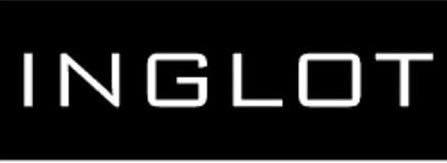
- Company type: Limited liability company
- Industry: Cosmetics
- Founded: 1983
- Founder: Wojciech Inglot
- Headquarters: Przemyśl, Poland
- Area served: Worldwide
- Key people: Zbigniew Niziński, Barbara Inglot, Elżbieta Inglot-Kobylańska, Joanna Kobryło, Magdalena Kluz-Pękalska, Adam Król
- Products: Make-up
- Website: inglotcosmetics.com

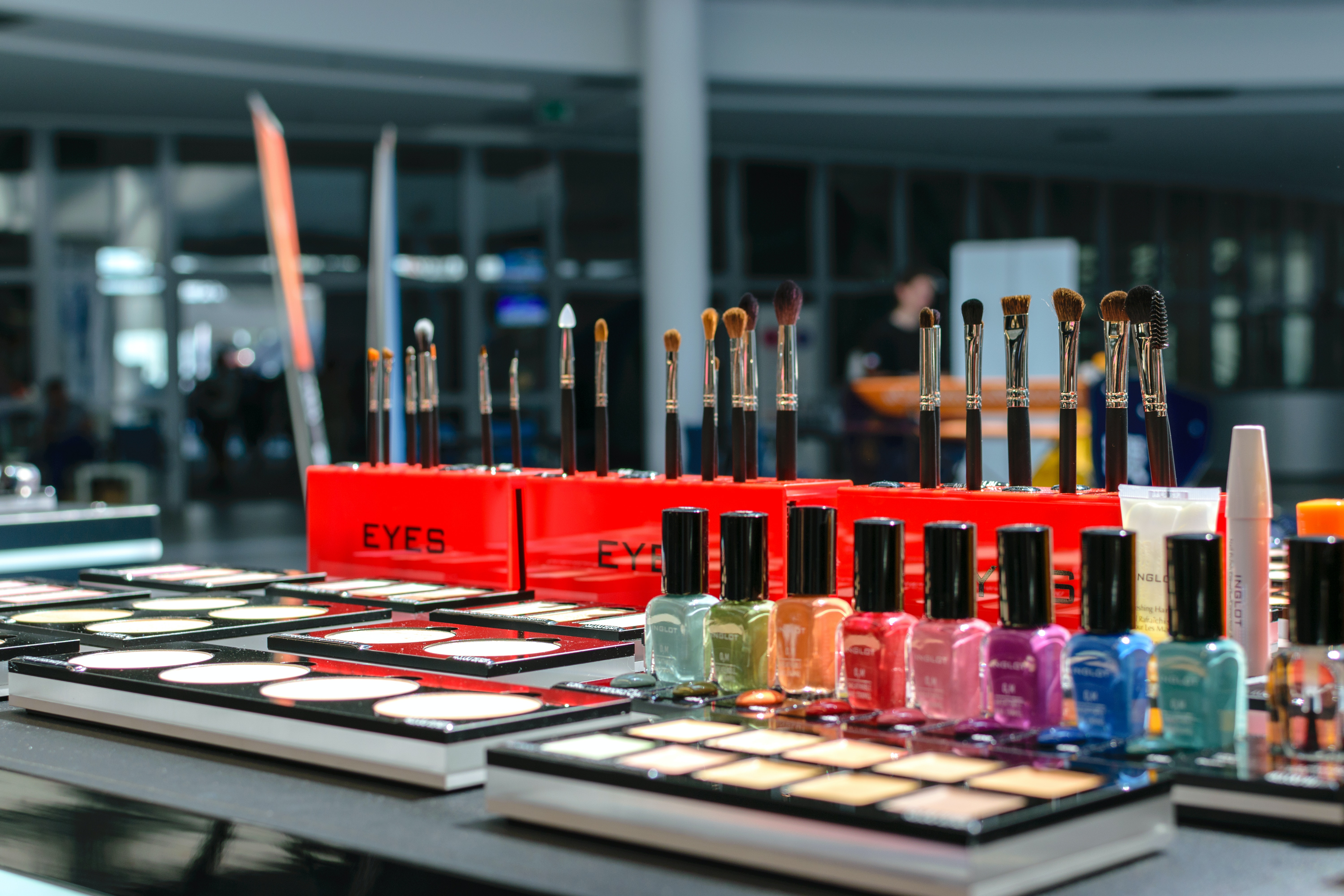
Inglot Cosmetics products

Inglot Cosmetics is a Polish cosmetics company headquartered in Przemyśl, south-eastern Poland, specializing in the manufacturing of make-up products. It is considered among the most successful makeup companies in the world which sells its products globally in over 950 boutique stores located in 90 countries. Around 95% of the products that Inglot has on offer are manufactured in a facility located in Przemyśl.

== History ==
The company was founded in 1983 by Wojciech Inglot, a Polish entrepreneur from Przemyśl. He was born on June 11, 1955, in the Polish People's Republic and graduated in chemistry from the Jagiellonian University in Kraków. He opened the first state-owned plant in the early 1980s. It specialized in the production of pharmaceuticals. After the fall of communism in Poland, he bought his own chemical equipment from the government and gradually focused on the manufacturing of cosmetics. In 1987, his company released its first nail polish. In 2006, the company opened its first store abroad in Montreal, Canada. Since then, Inglot brand has opened numerous stores in locations around the world.

== Collaborations ==
Inglot Cosmetics cooperates with a number of fashion brands and artists including Kenzo, Michael Costello, Jennifer Lopez and Francesco Scognamiglio.

On 26 April 2018, Jennifer Lopez debuted her limited-edition capsule collection in partnership with Inglot Cosmetics which became the brand's biggest partnership.

== See also ==
- Economy of Poland
- Cosmetic industry
