= Michael Costello (fashion designer) =

American fashion designer

- Born: January 20, 1983 (age 43); Los Angeles, California, U.S.

Michael Costello (born January 20, 1983) is an American fashion designer and reality television personality. He appeared on the eighth season of Project Runway and the first season of Project Runway All Stars.

== Early life ==
Michael Costello was born on January 20, 1983, in Sherman Oaks, Los Angeles. Costello's father is Italian-Hungarian and his mother is Greek Romani and Russian. At the age of 15, he moved to Palm Springs, California.

== Career ==
Costello started designing clothes at the age of two by drawing dresses on his bedroom walls. At the age of 15, he opened his first store at 286 North Palm Canyon Drive in Palm Springs. It was at his first store in Palm Springs where Costello started making custom pieces for celebrities including Céline Dion, Jennifer Lopez, Toni Braxton, Barry Manilow, Suzanne Somers, Faye Dunaway, Florence Henderson, and more. Costello made headlines for designing a matching hat and dress for rapper Cardi B for Paris Fashion Week. Kylie Jenner wore one of his dresses for her birthday magazine cover and Costello has partied with Lady Gaga. In 2015, Nicki Minaj wore one of his dresses at the American Music Awards. He collaborated with Essie nail polish and designed his own lipstick and eyeshadow shades for Inglot Cosmetics.

=== Project Runway ===
In 2010, Costello appeared on the 8th season of Project Runway. Costello placed 4th place, and became best friends with fellow contestant Mondo Guerra. In 2012, Costello competed as part of Project Runway All Stars and finished as the 1st runner up to Guerra.

=== Grammys ===
On January 26, 2014, Costello garnered nationwide attention by dressing Beyoncé in a white lace dress for the 56th Annual Grammy Awards. Costello credits that moment as the turning-point of his career. Since then, Costello has continuously dressed her for On the Run Tour, The Mrs. Carter Show World Tour, the Grammy-sponsored Stevie Wonder tribute, the Wearable Art Gala at the California African American Museum, and more.

On February 15, 2016, Costello dressed Meghan Trainor at the Grammys. Costello's designs for Beyoncé, Meghan Trainor, Tamar Braxton, Toni Braxton, Alicia Keys, Maren Morris, and more are on display at the Grammy Museum at L.A. Live.

Costello offered to dress Bebe Rexha for the Grammy's after designers called her "too big".

=== Television ===
In 2016, Costello collaborated with award-winning costume designer Lou Eyrich to design gowns for Lady Gaga for the TV series American Horror Story, leading up to the team's Primetime Emmy Award win for Outstanding Costumes For a Contemporary Series, Limited Series or Movie.

On July 12, 2016, Costello appeared on Good Morning America and won a nationwide fashion challenge. The following day, he worked with Kim Kardashian in creating a red carpet dress for the ESPY Awards. The styling session was filmed for E! Entertainment Television's Keeping Up With the Kardashians.

Costello has appeared as a fashion guest for television shows like Wendy, Steve Harvey Show, Good Day LA, Good Day NY, and more.

=== Achievements ===
On March 18, 2017, Costello received a star on the Palm Springs Walk of Stars. The presentation was held by Palm Springs Mayor Robert Moon, who also gave Costello the key to the City of Palm Springs and declared March 18 as the "Michael Costello Day".

== Controversies ==
Costello has had multiple feuds with African-American women, in which he has been accused of stealing designs and calling them racial slurs. Chrissy Teigen threatened him. British singer Leona Lewis accused him of bullying her after not fitting in one of his dresses. Asian-American model Shereen Wu accused Costello of changing her race to white by using AI.

== Personal life ==
Costello has two children Giovanni and Coco from an arranged marriage that ended in 2006. He is openly gay.

== See also ==
- List of fashion designers
- List of Project Runway contestants
