= Veejay Floresca =

Filipino fashion designer

- Born: Philippines
- Education: Academy of Art University
- Occupation: Fashion designer

Veejay Floresca is a Filipino fashion designer who won the 21st season of the American television series Project Runway. Previously, she competed on the Filipino version of the series. She also competed on Hulu's Dress My Tour.

== Early life and education ==
Floresca was born and raised in the Philippines. She earned a Master's degree in fashion at the Academy of Art University in San Francisco.

She is also an alumna of De La Salle–College of Saint Benilde, where she studied Fashion Design and Merchandising.

== Personal life ==
Floresca is a trans woman.

== See also ==
- List of fashion designers
