= Gretchen Jones =

American fashion designer

- Occupation: Creative Business Advisor
- Television: Project Runway Season 8 (Winner)

Gretchen Jones is an American fashion designer, who won the eighth season of Project Runway.

== Project Runway ==
During her run in Project Runway, Jones placed in the top two in the first three challenges, winning the first two. She was accused of manipulating and bullying her team during one of the challenges. Throughout the season, she admitted she got tired, and lost some of her inspiration. After struggling to regain her position at the top of the competition midway through the season, her collection at New York Fashion Week made her the winner of Season 8 in October 2010. The finale became memorable due to the longer-than-usual judging process and the heated debate between judges Michael Kors and Nina Garcia, who were clearly in favor of Gretchen's collection, and Heidi Klum and Jessica Simpson, who favored Mondo's collection over Gretchen's. Jones is regarded as the most controversial winner of the series since Project Runway's inception. Tim Gunn, among others, has been a vocal critic of the decision made by the judges.

== After Project Runway ==
After her Project Runway win, Jones moved to New York City to create a ready-to-wear line. In 2013, Jones joined Portland-based Pendleton Woolen Mills as its fashion director of womenswear.

In 2018, she graduated from the University of London College of Fashion with an MBA in fashion.
