= Models of the Runway =

- Created by: Eli Holzman
- Starring: Heidi Klum; Tim Gunn
- Country of origin: United States
- Original language: English
- No. of seasons: 2
- No. of episodes: 28

Production
- Running time: 30 minutes (including commercials)
- Production companies: Bunim/Murray Productions; Heidi Klum Productions; Full Picture Entertainment; Miramax Television; The Weinstein Company Television

Original release
- Network: Lifetime
- Release: August 20, 2009 – April 22, 2010

Models of the Runway is a television series on the Lifetime network. It was an offshoot of Project Runway appearing each week during seasons when Project Runway aired, generally immediately following the broadcast of the latest episode, and following the experiences of the fashion models on Project Runway, focusing on their social interactions and weekly eliminations. It ran for two seasons and like Project Runway it was hosted by Heidi Klum.

== Format ==
The models are housed together throughout each season. Consequently, many friendships, some conflicts, and occasional animosities can be observed. Also, because fashion modeling is a competitive occupation, Models of the Runway examines rivalries among the models, relationships with the fashion designers, cosmetic techniques, and individual personalities, as well as career histories and aspirations.

Near the end of each show, a selection process occurs, during which Project Runway fashion designers choose which model they wish to work with for the week. All of the models stand in a runway lineup with Heidi Klum in the center, while the designers sit on the ground floor facing them. The models appear by wearing the same outfit (barefoot and a short black shift dress). The sequence by which designers select models is based upon how high they scored during the preceding episode's design competition as well as random pick from a bag: The winning designer has first pick, the runner-up selects second, the lowest-scoring designer picks last, etc. Because there is one more model than the number of designers at the beginning of the selection process, one model remains unpicked at the end, and will be sent home. Thus, the surviving designer with the lowest score during the previous week plays the most important role in determining which model will be eliminated.

The scene when the just-eliminated fashion designer meets with the models is often poignant, since the model associated with that designer has a strong likelihood of leaving soon. The closing sequences of each program also tend to be tear-evoking, as the surviving models gather around the eliminated model and bid her farewell. Tim Gunn also appears during the final scenes, typically complimenting the model and reminding her that she must promptly pack up and head home. It was announced that Models of the Runway will not return for a third season. Instead, Austin Scarlett and Santino Rice are starring in their own show "On the Road with Austin and Santino".

== Models ==
=== Season 1 models (Season 6 of Project Runway) ===
Name	Age	From	Place finished
Yosuzi Sylvester	21	Venezuela	16th
Erika Macke	21	Las Vegas, Nevada	WITHDREW
Erica Milde	23	Chicago, Illinois	14th
Valerie Roy	27	New York, New York	13th
Erica Wiltz	29	New York, New York	12th
Fatma		Africa	11th
Vanessa Fitzgerald	20	New York, New York	10th
Tara Egan	21	Chicago, Illinois	9th
Ebony Jointer	19	Hacienda Heights, California	8th
Celine Chua	28	Singapore	7th
Kojii Helnwein	25	Ireland	6th
Katie Sticksel	22	Los Angeles, California	5th
Matar Cohen	24	Shoham, Israel	4th
Lisa Blades	24	Los Angeles, California	3rd
Tanisha Harper	24	Phoenix, Arizona	2nd
Kalyn Hemphill	19	New York, New York	1st

=== Season 2 models (Season 7 of Project Runway) ===
Name	Age	From	Place finished
Kelly Gervais	19	Livingston, New Jersey	16th
Elizaveta Melnitchenko	19	Austria	15th
Sophia Lee	26	Taiwan	14th
Sarah Bell	22	Cincinnati, Ohio	13th
Kasey Ashcraft	24	Salisbury, Maryland	12th
Megan Davis	19	Des Moines, Iowa	11th
Alexis Broker	25	Denver, Colorado	10th
Alison Gingerich	23	Cincinnati, Ohio	9th
Holly Ridings	24	Roscoe, Illinois	8th
Valeria Leonova	23	Russia	WITHDREW
Cerri McQuillan	23	Ireland	6th
Monique Darton	24	Brainerd, Minnesota	5th
Brittany Oldehoff	20	Fort Lauderdale, Florida	4th
Brandise Danesewich	32	Canada	3rd
Lorena Angjeli	20	Albania	2nd
Kristina Sajko	29	Croatia	1st

== See also ==
- Project Runway (season 6)
- Project Runway (season 7)
