= Mila Hermanovski =

American fashion designer (born 1969)

- Born: May 11, 1969 (age 56); Dallas, Texas
- Education: Rhode Island School of Design
- Labels: Mila Hermanovski; FORM; M I L A

Mila Hermanovski (born May 11, 1969) is an American costume designer and fashion designer best known for modernist womenswear.

== Early life and education ==
Hermanovski was born in Dallas, Texas to parents Delmar and Carol Hermanovski. She is of Latvian, German and Northern European descent. She attended the Greenhill School, earning a National Scholastic Achievement Award in Art during her time there. At the age of eighteen, Hermanovski moved to Providence, Rhode Island to attend Rhode Island School of Design to pursue a Bachelor of Fine Arts in apparel design, graduating in 1991. During her studies at RISD, Hermanovski studied abroad at Ravensbourne in London.

== Career ==
After finishing her studies abroad in London, Hermanovski interned with French UK designer, Val Piriou. Then after returning to the United States to complete her degree at RISD, Hermanovski worked for Calvin Klein as a design assistant.

In 1998, Hermanovski moved to Los Angeles to work as a costume designer after taking on a few New York-based projects. She has since worked on several film and television productions including Austin Powers in Goldmember, 13 Going on 30, Alias, Nip/Tuck, Freedom Writers, Leverage, Dancing with the Stars, Tron: Legacy, Star Trek Into Darkness and Castle.

Desiring to branch out from costume designing towards fashion design, her original focus, Hermanovski was approached by the casting team for the seventh season of Project Runway in 2010. Since she had been costuming, she attended her casting session with one piece produced during her time at RISD nearly 20 years prior in addition to other pieces made the week before presenting before judges Tim Gunn, Nick Verreos, and Zoe Glassner from Marie Claire magazine. Hermanovski was selected as one of the sixteen finalists to compete that season and placed third after showing a well-received Fall 2010 collection entitled Shadows at Mercedes-Benz Fashion Week. Gunn responded to Hermanovski's collection by stating, "Contemporary American sportswear needs Mila."

After Project Runway, Hermanovski designed a Holiday 2010 collection as a companion to Shadows, and then officially debuted a Spring 2011 collection entitled Rutilated at Los Angeles Fashion Week.

Hermanovski was asked to return to compete in Project Runway: All-Stars by producers in 2011, in which she finished sixth, and returned after her elimination to assist Mondo Guerra in the season's finale. Guerra went on to win the competition.

In March 2012, Hermanovski debuted her Fall 2012 collection at her second Los Angeles Fashion Week showing, and opened an online shop for her designs in October of the same year. Since then, Hermanovski has released collections for Fall 2013 (embrace), Spring 2014 (Aerial), Fall 2014 (Excavate), and Fall 2015. Her line of clothing was bought by several national and international boutiques and stores. However, her Fall 2015 collection was the last to be produced, and Hermanovski has since returned to working as a costume designer in television and film.

Hermanovski blogged about Project Runway on Lifetime's site from 2012 to 2016.
