= Mondo Guerra =

American fashion designer (born 1978)

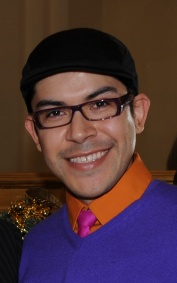
- Mondo Guerra in 2010
- Born: Armando Thomas Guerra; June 6, 1978 (age 48); Denver, Colorado, U.S.
- Occupation: Fashion designer
- Website: www.mondoguerra.com

Armando Thomas "Mondo" Guerra (born June 6, 1978) is an American fashion designer who finished as runner-up on Season 8 of Project Runway, and later won the series' first season of Project Runway All Stars. After coming out as HIV positive on the show, Guerra has become a spokesperson for two national HIV campaigns — Merck's Project I Design and Subaru's Dining Out For Life. Guerra was also the first contestant on the show to come from Denver, Colorado.

== Early life ==
Guerra is a fifth-generation Mexican-American from the Denver area. He attended high school at the Denver School of the Arts.

In 2001, when living in New York City, he tested HIV positive, at the age of 22. He didn't start antiretroviral therapy until several years later and struggled with adherence, experiencing several side effects and being hospitalized more than once later in the 2000s. In an interview he has spoken about struggling with AIDS in the American healthcare system and reliance on Ryan White programs as well as having depression and keeping his HIV status secret, including from his family. He has also spoken about HIV stigma and "AIDS phobia" within the gay community.

== Project Runway ==
Guerra was on the eighth season of Project Runway, aired in 2010. After placing in the top, but not winning, on a number of challenges, then placing in the bottom but not being eliminated in the seventh (Resort Wear Challenge) episode, he won the challenges on the eighth (Jacqueline Kennedy Challenge), ninth (L'Oreal Makeup Challenge) and tenth (HP Pattern Challenge) episodes. He also won $20,000 for the ninth challenge, which involved both a "couture" look and a "ready-to-wear" look.

During the tenth challenge, after a question from Nina García and without having expected to do so, he revealed to the judges that his pattern of bright, bold plus signs on a pant was inspired by his HIV+ status, and that he had been keeping his HIV status a secret for ten years; in an interview he mentioned that the schedule was particularly difficult for his medication adherence, despite coming shortly after a very low CD4 count. He had not previously disclosed his HIV status to his family and the show's producers and Tim Gunn spoke with him about how he wanted to handle the issue; Guerra has described feeling a sense of relief and self-love at going public with his status. He finally disclosed to his family shortly before the tenth challenge was broadcast.

With a collection themed on the Day of the Dead fan favorite Guerra came in second place in the final competition held at Mercedes-Benz Fashion Week at the Lincoln Center for the Performing Arts in New York City. Oregonian Gretchen Jones took first place, and Hawaiiʻan Andy South — now Ari South — came in third.

Project Runway executive producer Heidi Klum — who had pushed for Guerra to win over Jones in a lengthy split debate over the winner — appeared in a modified version of one of Guerra's final collection gowns for the Los Angeles premiere of the movie Black Swan a few weeks after the airing of the final episode.

Guerra was the winner of the 2012 series first season of Project Runway All Stars, beating out season 1 designer Austin Scarlett and close friend from season 8 Michael Costello.

In 2019, Guerra appeared in the seventh season of Project Runway All Stars, where he assisted Irina Shabayeva for the final challenge.

Guerra also was a judge for Project Runway Season 10, episode 9, in which contestants had to make their own print for fabric and design an outfit using the fabric. The episode flashed back to Guerra's win for this challenge during Season 8.

== Other notable work ==
On November 30, 2010, Guerra appeared with Liza Minnelli, Kenneth Cole and Cheyenne Jackson on the trading floor of the New York Stock Exchange to ring the opening bell on behalf of amFAR, to usher in World AIDS Day.

Also in commemoration of World AIDS Day, he designed a limited edition of T-shirts, one with a Day of the Dead sugar skull and one with a tree of life. These shirts were sold on Piperlime.com starting at midnight on December 1, 2010. For each shirt sold, $20 was donated to amfAR. In his statement to Fox News Latino for his motivations in doing this, he said, "The Day of the Dead is celebration of our loved ones who have passed. When I was thinking of World Aids day I wanted to create something very true to who I am, and what I know. Who I've known and miss and those people in my life that still fight this disease. It's about love and continuation."

In the season 10 finale episode of the hit reality competition show RuPaul’s Drag Race, contestant Blair St Clair appeared wearing a gown designed by Guerra himself. It was rewarded the “Top Toot of the Week” by the show's official fashion review online series, Fashion Photo RuView.

== Filmography ==
=== Television ===
Year	Title	Role	Notes
2010-2012	Project Runway	Contestant	Season 8, Runner-up
2010-2012	Project Runway	Himself	Season 10, Guest judge (1 episode)
2012-2019	Project Runway All Stars	Contestant	Season 1, Winner
2012-2019	Project Runway All Stars	Himself	Season 7, Guest (1 episode)
