= Project Runway season 7 =

Project Runway
- Season 7
- Region 1 DVD cover
- No. of tasks: 11
- No. of contestants: 16
- Winner: Seth Aaron Henderson
- No. of episodes: 15

Release
- Original network: Lifetime
- Original release: January 14 – April 22, 2010

Season chronology
- ← Previous; Season 6 Next → Season 8

The seventh season of Project Runway premiered on January 14, 2010, on Lifetime.

Season 7 featured the return of the show to New York City, following a move to Los Angeles for season 6. Returning as judges are supermodel Heidi Klum, fashion designer Michael Kors, and Marie Claire fashion director Nina Garcia. Tim Gunn returned as a mentor to the aspiring designers.

The winner of this season, Seth Aaron Henderson received an editorial feature in an issue of Marie Claire magazine, a cash prize of $100,000 to start a personal line line, an opportunity to sell the line on Bluefly.com, and a $50,000 technology suite from Hewlett-Packard to create, design, and run a business. The winning model of this season will receive a $25,000 cash prize and take part in the winning designer's fashion spread in Marie Claire.

In 2012, Anthony Williams and Mila Hermanovski competed on Project Runway All Stars (season 1), with Anthony placing 9th and Mila placing 6th of 13.

Also in 2012, Emilio Sosa competed on Project Runway All Stars (season 2) and was the runner-up.

In 2013, Seth Aaron Henderson competed in Project Runway All Stars (season 3) and won the competition.

In 2014, Jay Sario competed in Project Runway All Stars (season 4) placing 6th of 14.

In 2018, Anthony Williams once again competed on Project Runway All Stars (season 6) and won the competition.

In 2019, Seth Aaron Henderson returned for a third time to compete on Project Runway All Stars (season 7) against worldwide Project Runway winners. Seth Aaron placed 13th of 14.

In 2023, Mila Hermanovski competed on Project Runway (season 20), placing 13th of 14.

In 2025, Jesus Estrada competed on Project Runway (season 21), alongside his twin brother Antonio. Jesus was a runner-up, while Antonio finished in 4th place.

== Contestants ==
Contestants of the seventh season

Contestant	Age	Hometown	Finish	Outcome
Christiane King	30	Abidjan, Côte d'Ivoire	Episode 1	16th place
Pamela Ptak	47	Pittsfield, Massachusetts	Episode 2	15th place
Ping Wu	34	Chengdu, China	Episode 3	14th place
Jesus Estrada	21	Mazatlán, Sinaloa	Episode 4	13th place
Anna Marie Lynett	23	Whitefish Bay, Wisconsin	Episode 5	12th place
Janeane Marie Ceccanti	27	Willows, California	Episode 6	11th place
Jesse LeNoir	25	Painesville, Ohio	Episode 7	10th place
Ben Chmura	30	Meriden, Connecticut	Episode 8	9th place
Amy Sarabi	25	Plano, Texas	Episode 9	8th place
Maya Luz	21	Santa Fe, New Mexico	Episode 11	7th place
Jonathan Peters	29	Woonsocket, Rhode Island	Episode 11	6th place
Anthony Williams *	28	Birmingham, Alabama	Episode 12	5th place
Jay Nicolas Sario	31	Manila, Philippines	Episode 13	4th place
Mila Hermanovski	40	Dallas, Texas	Episode 14	3rd place
Emilio Sosa	43	Santo Domingo, Dominican Republic	Episode 14	Runner-up
Seth Aaron Henderson	38	San Diego, California	Episode 14	Winner

* Anthony was originally eliminated after Amy, but returned to the competition following Maya's withdrawal

=== Models ===
Model	Hometown	Age	Place Finished
Kelly Gervais	Livingston, New Jersey	19	16th
Elizaveta Melnitchenko	Salzburg, Austria	19	15th
Sophia Lee	Taipei, Taiwan	26	14th
Sarah Bell	Cincinnati, Ohio	22	13th
Kasey Ashcraft	Salisbury, Maryland	24	12th
Megan Davis	Des Moines, Iowa	19	11th
Alexis Broker	Denver, Colorado	25	10th
Alison Gingerich	Leesburg, Ohio	23	9th
Holly Ridings	Roscoe, Illinois	24	8th
Valeria Leonova	Tula, Russia	23	7th (Quit)
Cerri McQuillan	Dublin, Ireland	23	6th
Monique Darton	Brainerd, Minnesota	24	5th
Brittany Oldehoff	Fort Lauderdale, Florida	20	4th
Brandise Danesewich	Saskatchewan, Canada	32	3rd
Lorena Angjeli	Tirana, Albania	20	Runner-up
Kristina Sajko	Zagreb, Croatia	29	Winner

== Challenges ==
Designer Elimination Table
Designers	1	2	3	4	5	6	7	8	9 ^{1}	10	11 ^{2}	12 ^{3}	13 ^{4}	14	Eliminated Episode
Seth Aaron	HIGH	IN	LOW	IN	IN	WIN	IN	HIGH	WIN	HIGH	LOW	HIGH	ADV	WINNER	14 – Finale, Part 2
Emilio	WIN	IN	IN	IN	HIGH	IN	LOW	IN	WIN	WIN	WIN	WIN	ADV	RUNNER-UP	14 – Finale, Part 2
Mila	IN	HIGH	WIN	HIGH	LOW	IN	HIGH	LOW	IN	LOW	LOW	LOW	ADV	3RD PLACE	14 – Finale, Part 2
Jay	IN	WIN	HIGH	IN	IN	HIGH	WIN	IN	LOW	IN	LOW	LOW	OUT		13 – Finale, Part 1
Anthony	LOW	IN	LOW	IN	WIN	IN	LOW	IN	HIGH	OUT	WIN	OUT			12 – The Big, Top Designers
Jonathan	IN	IN	HIGH	IN	IN	LOW	IN	WIN	LOW	LOW	OUT				11 – Sew Much Pressure
Maya	IN	IN	HIGH	HIGH	IN	IN	HIGH	HIGH	HIGH	HIGH	WD				11 – Sew Much Pressure
Amy	IN	HIGH	IN	WIN	IN	LOW	IN	LOW	OUT						9 – Takin' It To The Streets
Ben	IN	IN	IN	IN	HIGH	IN	IN	OUT							8 – The Elements of Fashion
Jesse	IN	IN	LOW	LOW	IN	HIGH	OUT								7 – Hard Wear
Janeane	IN	IN	IN	IN	LOW	OUT									6 – A Little Bit of Fashion
Anna	IN	IN	IN	LOW	OUT										5 – Run For Cover
Jesus	LOW	LOW	IN	OUT											4 – Design Your Heart Out
Ping	HIGH	LOW	OUT												3 – High's and Low's of Fashion
Pamela	IN	OUT													2 – The Fashion Farm
Christiane	OUT														1 – Back to New York

- ^Note 1 : Team Emilio and Seth Aaron co-won Episode 9, for the first time since Season 2.
- ^Note 2 : Maya withdrew for personal reasons at the beginning of Episode 11. Anthony, who was originally eliminated in Episode 10, was brought back to take her place. Also, two winners were chosen for this challenge: Emilio and Anthony. Each of their dresses will be worn on the red carpet by Heidi Klum and Jessica Alba. This is the first time two designers won a single challenge yet were not a team.
- ^Note 3 : Emilio was advanced to fashion week first during the judging session. Seth Aaron was also advanced to fashion week. Jay and Mila will both create collections for fashion week, however only one will advance to compete at Bryant Park with Emilio and Seth Aaron.
- ^Note 4 : Jay and Mila each presented three looks to the judges. After much deliberation, they concluded that Mila was more ready to show at fashion week than Jay. She advanced to the finale, and Jay was consequently eliminated.

The designer won Project Runway Season 7.
The designer was advanced to Fashion Week.
The designer won the challenge.
The designer came in second but did not win the challenge.
The designer had one of the highest scores for that challenge, but did not win.
The designer had one of the lowest scores for that challenge, but was not eliminated.
The designer was in the bottom two, but was not eliminated.
The designer lost and was out of the competition.
The designer withdrew from the competition.

=== Models of the Runway ===
Model Elimination Table^{5}
Model	1	2^{6}	3^{11}	4^{7}	5	6^{8}	7	8	9^{11}^{12}	10	11	12	13^{10}	14	Episode
Kristina	SH	SH	AW	SH	AW	AW	AW	AW	MH	AW	MH	SH	SH	WINNER (SH)	14 – Finale, part 2
Lorena	JC	MH	MH	MH	BC	BC	ML	ML	ML	ES	ES	ES	ES	ES	14 – Finale, part 2
Brandise	JP	JP	PW	ML	MH	JP	MH	MH	ES	MH	JP	MH	MH	MH	14 – Finale, part 2
Brittany	JE	JE	JC	JE	ES	JC	JS	JS	JS	JS	JS	JS	JS	OUT	13 – Finale, part 1
Monique	ML	ML	JP	JS	JS	JS	AS	ES	AW	ML	AW	AW	OUT		12 – What Do You Mean, I'm Not Going to Bryant Park...?
Cerri	AL	AL	AL	AL	AL	MH	JP	JP	JP	JP	SH	OUT			11 – Second Chances
Valeria	AS	JC	ML	JC	SH	SH	SH	SH	SH	SH	WD^{9}				10 – Should I Stay or Should I Go?
Holly	ES	ES	AS	ES	AS	ES	ES	AS	AS	OUT					9 – To Pick Me or Not to Pick Me
Alison	AW	AS	ES	JP	JP	AS	BC	BC	OUT						8 – It’s a Hairy Situation
Alexis	MH	AW	BC	BC	JL	JL	JL	OUT							7 – Hard to Wear
Megan	JL	JL	JL	JL	ML	ML	OUT								6 – Role Models
Kasey	JS	JS	JS	AS	JC	OUT									5 – I'm Ready for My Close-Up
Sarah	PP	PP	SH	AW	OUT										4 – Heart to Heart
Sophia	BC	BC	JE	OUT											3 – Modeling Difficulties
Elizaveta	PW	PW	OUT												2 – Excuse Me, Is My Butt Showing
Kelly	CK	OUT													1 – Walk This Way

- ^Note 5 : The aftershow "Models of the Runway" fully reveals the eliminated model of a future challenge.
- ^Note 6 : The table does not show the results of the designers' model pick, in which everyone kept the same model, but the start of Project Runway episode 2, in which the models chose the designers. Alexis switched from Mila to Anthony, causing Alison and Valeria to have to switch and leaving Lorena with Mila
- ^Note 7 : In place of the models, a group of women with heart disease modeled the designs. Colored boxes in this column refer to the models assigned to the winning and losing designers.
- ^Note 8 : In this episode the models walk the runway with 5- to 9-year-old girls.
- ^Note 9 : Cerri was originally eliminated in Episode 10; however, she was brought back after Valeria, Seth Aaron's model, voluntarily withdrew to accept a job at Donna Karan.
- ^Note 10 : Only Brandise and Brittany walked the runway because their designers Mila and Jay had to compete for the final slot at Fashion Week.
- ^Note 11 : In this challenge designers worked in pairs, and some models wore looks designed by their designers' teammate.
- ^Note 12 :Holly was paired with eliminated designer Amy, but it was actually Cerri who wore the losing design.

The model won Project Runway Season 7.
The model wore the winning design that challenge.
The model wore the losing design that challenge.
The model was eliminated.
The model was brought back into the competition.
The model withdrew from the competition.

Designer legend

- Amy Sarabi: AS
- Anna Lynett: AL
- Anthony Williams: AW
- Ben Chmura: BC
- Christiane King: CK
- Emilio Sosa: ES
- Janeane Marie Ceccanti: JC
- Jay Nicolas Sario: JS
- Jesse LeNoir: JL
- Jesus Estrada: JE
- Jonathan Peters: JP
- Maya Luz: ML
- Mila Hermanovski: MH
- Pamela Ptak: PP
- Ping Wu: PW
- Seth Aaron Henderson: SH

== Episodes ==
=== Episode 1: Back to New York ===
Original Airdate: January 14, 2010

The designers were asked to create a garment that represents who they are as a designer. They selected five fabrics each from a wide selection provided by Mood. The designers were preassigned models for their challenge and given one day to complete their design.

- Judges: Heidi Klum, Nina Garcia, Michael Kors
- Guest Judge: Nicole Richie
  - WINNER: Emilio
  - BOTTOM TWO: Christiane King & Jesus Estrada
  - ELIMINATED: Christiane

=== Episode 2: The Fashion Farm ===
Original Airdate: January 21, 2010

The designers were asked to create a party look from a burlap potato sack for their models to wear to an industry event. As the clients for this round, the models were allowed to choose their designers.

- Judges: Heidi Klum, Nina Garcia, Michael Kors
- Guest Judge: Lauren Hutton
  - WINNER: Jay
  - BOTTOM TWO: Pamela Ptak & Jesus Estrada
  - ELIMINATED: Pamela

=== Episode 3: The Highs and Lows of Fashion ===
Original Airdate: January 28, 2010

The designers were taken to the Metropolitan Museum of Art and shown ten iconic looks by famous designers such as Yves Saint Laurent, Christian Dior, Madame Grès, and Cristóbal Balenciaga. They were then asked to create a high-end signature look worthy of a master collection. The designers were placed in teams of two and given $500 per team to create their looks. As the winner of the last challenge, Jay was automatically a team leader. Tim drew the names of the other team leaders via a random lottery; those team leaders then selected their partners in the order they were chosen, as indicated in the table below.

On the second day of the challenge, the teams were asked to create a second "look for less", using only 10% of the budget for the first look and inspired by the signature look of one of the other teams. Heidi mentioned, when about to eliminate one of the bottom four designers, that two of them might be out.

Team	Team Members	Second Look Inspired by
1	Jay and Maya	Janeane and Ben
2	Jesus and Amy	Ping and Jesse
3	Anthony and Seth Aaron	Jesus and Amy
4	Janeane and Ben	Mila and Jonathan
5	Mila and Jonathan	Anthony and Seth Aaron
6	Ping and Jesse	Emilio and Anna
7	Emilio and Anna	Jay and Maya

- Judges: Heidi Klum, Nina Garcia, Michael Kors
- Guest Judge: Matthew Williamson
  - WINNER: Mila
  - BOTTOM TWO: Anthony Willams & Ping Wu
  - ELIMINATED: Ping

=== Episode 4: Design Your Heart Out ===
Original Airdate: February 4, 2010

The designers were asked to design a look for a Fashion Week gala. The looks were required to feature the color red and elements with Campbell's branding, and were modeled by women who had been impacted by heart disease. Designers had a budget of $100 to purchase fabrics and other elements and one day of time to finish the design. The winning garment was produced and sold on projectrunway.com, with proceeds going to the American Heart Association.

- Judges: Heidi Klum, Nina Garcia, Michael Kors
- Guest Judge: Georgina Chapman
  - WINNER: Amy
  - BOTTOM TWO: Anna Lynett& Jesus Estrada
  - ELIMINATED: Jesus

=== Episode 5: Run for Cover ===
Original Airdate: February 11, 2010

The designers were asked to design an outfit for the cover of Marie Claire magazine. The winning design was worn by Heidi Klum on the cover of the April 2010 issue.

- Judges: Heidi Klum, Nina Garcia, Michael Kors
- Guest Judge: Joanna Coles, editor in chief of Marie Claire
  - WINNER: Anthony
  - ELIMINATED: Anna

=== Episode 6: A Little Bit of Fashion ===
Original Airdate: February 18, 2010

The designers were asked to create a fashionable children's look to be modeled by a group of girls aged 5–9. Later the designers were asked to create an additional companion look for their adult models.

- Judges: Heidi Klum, Nina Garcia, Michael Kors
- Guest Judge: Tory Burch
  - WINNER: Seth Aaron
  - ELIMINATED: Janeane

=== Episode 7: Hard Wear ===
Original Airdate: March 4, 2010

The designers were asked to create an innovative look and an accessory from materials sourced from a hardware store.

- Judges: Heidi Klum, Nina Garcia, Michael Kors
- Guest Judges: Isabel Toledo and Stephen Webster, jewelry designer
  - WINNER: Jay
  - ELIMINATED: Jesse

=== Episode 8: The Elements of Fashion ===
Original Airdate: March 11, 2010

The designers were asked to create a look inspired by one of the four classical elements: Earth, Water, Air, and Fire.

As the winner of the last challenge, Jay was allowed to choose his own element. After that, two designers were allotted to each element. The designers got to choose their element in the order in which Tim drew their names out of a bag.

The designers and their elements were as follows:

Element	Designers
Earth	Mila, Emilio
Water	Maya, Ben
Air	Jay, Jonathan, Seth Aaron
Fire	Anthony, Amy

- Judges: Heidi Klum, Nina Garcia, Michael Kors
- Guest Judge: Roland Mouret
  - WINNER: Jonathan
  - ELIMINATED: Ben

=== Episode 9: Takin' It To The Streets ===
Original Airdate: March 18, 2010

The designers were asked to create looks inspired by a distinctive New York City neighborhood. They were divided into four teams of two, with Tim drawing the names of team leaders at random. Each team was responsible for creating a day look and an evening look.

The teams and their neighborhoods were as follows (team leaders are named first):

Neighborhood	Team Members
Chinatown	Anthony and Maya
East Village	Jay and Mila
Upper East Side	Amy and Jonathan
Harlem	Emilio and Seth Aaron

- Judges: Heidi Klum, Nina Garcia, Michael Kors
- Guest Judges: Francisco Costa (sitting in for Michael Kors) and Molly Sims
  - WINNERS: Seth Aaron and Emilio
  - ELIMINATED: Amy

=== Episode 10: Hey, That's My Fabric ===
Original Airdate: March 25, 2010

The designers were asked to design and create their own print fabric as the basis for their looks.

- Judges: Heidi Klum, Nina Garcia, Michael Kors
- Guest Judge: Vivienne Tam
  - WINNER: Emilio
  - ELIMINATED: Anthony

=== Episode 11: Sew Much Pressure ===
Original Airdate: April 1, 2010

The designers were asked to create a red-carpet look for Heidi Klum.

Maya chose to withdraw from the competition because she felt that she was too young and was not developed enough as a designer. Since Maya withdrew from the competition, Anthony was brought back, and won the challenge along with Emilio.

- Judges: Heidi Klum, Nina Garcia, Michael Kors
- Guest Judge: Jessica Alba
  - WINNERS: Emilio and Anthony
  - ELIMINATED: Jonathan
  - WITHDREW: Maya

This challenge marked a record-breaking third consecutive win for Emilio.

=== Episode 12: The Big, Top Designers ===
Original Airdate: April 8, 2010

The designers were asked to create a look inspired by the Ringling Brothers and Barnum & Bailey Circus.

- Judges: Heidi Klum, Nina Garcia, Michael Kors
- Guest Judge: Cynthia Rowley
  - ADVANCED: Emilio and Seth Aaron
  - ELIMINATED: Anthony

Jay and Mila were both kept in the competition and asked to design collections, but only one of them would show at Fashion Week. This challenge boosted Emilio's own record from three consecutive wins to four.

=== Episode 13: Finale – Part 1 ===
Original Airdate: April 15, 2010

Four designers were given budget of $9000 and four months to finish a ten-piece collection for New York Fashion Week. Tim Gunn visited the four remaining designers as they worked on their collections at home. When the designers returned to New York, Mila and Jay were asked to show three looks on the runway for the judges to decide which one of them would show at Fashion Week.

- Judges: Heidi Klum, Nina Garcia, Michael Kors
- ADVANCED: Mila
- ELIMINATED: Jay
- Had Jay been chosen rather than Mila, there would have been an all-male final following two all-female ones.

=== Episode 14: Finale – Part 2 ===
Original Airdate: April 22, 2010

Three finalists work the last part of preparation, including model casting and hair and makeup counseling, for the final New York Fashion Week. Each showed their collection at Fashion Week before the winner of Project Runway Season 7 was announced. Although not televised, all the seasons contestants showed collections to prevent the audience from leaking the identities of the three finalists.

- Judges: Heidi Klum, Nina Garcia, Michael Kors
- Guest Judge: Faith Hill
- WINNER: Seth Aaron
- ELIMINATED: Mila and Emilio

=== Episode 15: Reunion Special ===
Original Airdate: April 22, 2010

A half-hour show after airing of Project Runway Season 7 Finale, hosted by Tim Gunn and Nina Garcia. All 16 designers and 16 models gathered together to talk about the events on the show and off camera scenes. There are a few highlights in this reunion episode: Designers being disloyal to their models, the conflict between Ping and Jesse, Anthony's controversial comments about Mila, Cerri's negative comments about Jay's design, Maya's withdrawal from competition, and others. Maya was also awarded the Fan Favourite prize.
