= Christian Cowan =

English fashion designer (born 1994)

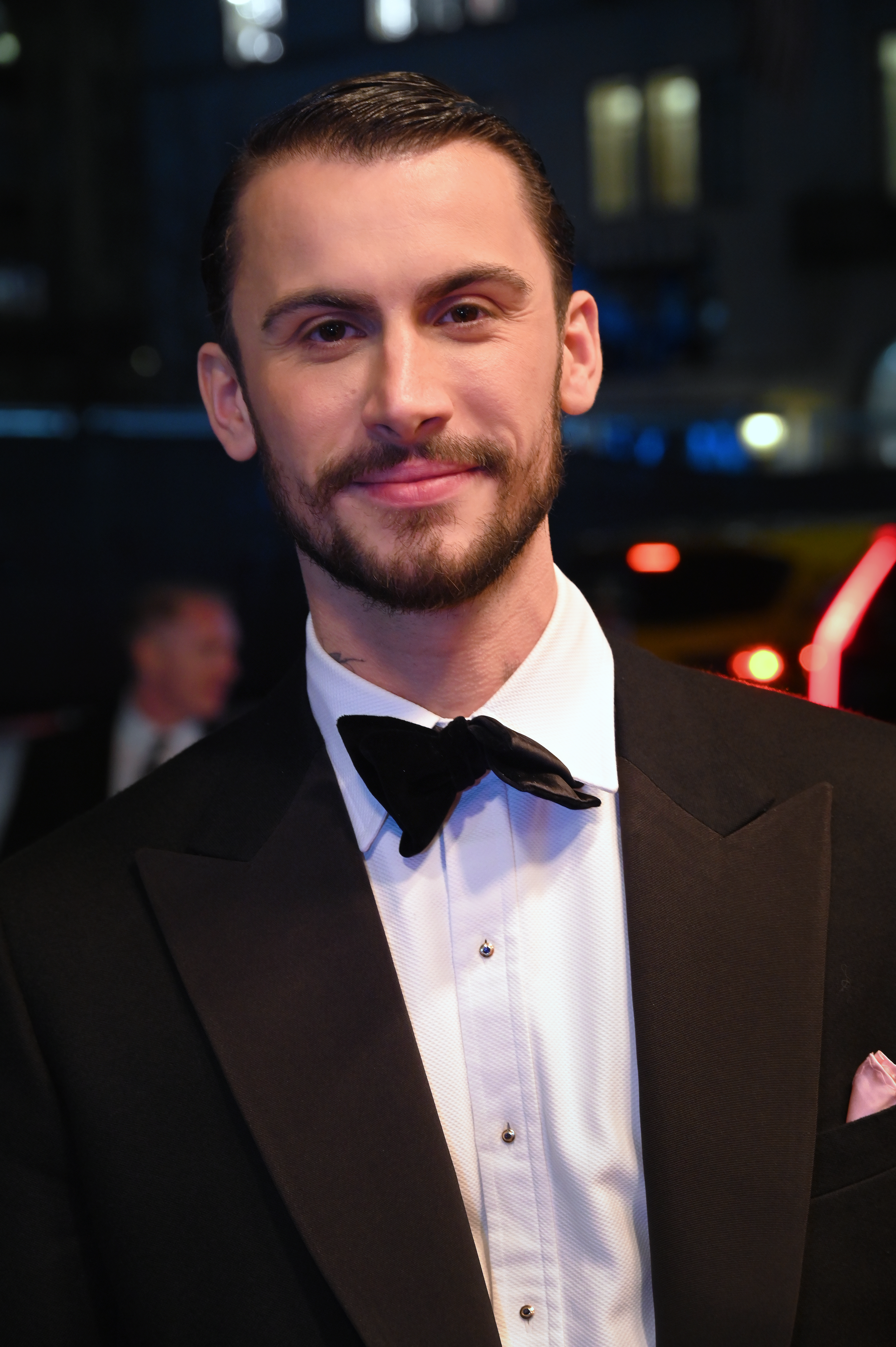
- Cowan in 2025
- Born: 25 April 1994 (age 32)
- Occupation: Fashion designer
- Partner(s): Sam Smith (2022–present; engaged)

Christian Cowan (born 25 April 1994) is an English fashion designer. His eponymous fashion label launched in 2017. He gained prominence for his vibrant, playful fashion designs, often featuring sequins, bright colours, and dramatic silhouettes, and has dressed numerous celebrities, including Lady Gaga, Mariah Carey, Jennifer Lopez, Cardi B, and Miley Cyrus.

== Early life ==
Cowan grew up in Cambridgeshire, England. His parents divorced when he was seven and both remarried, and he grew up in a blended family of eleven children, primarily at Longstowe Hall, a 16th century estate in Cambridgeshire.

== Career ==
Cowan completed a foundation year at Central Saint Martins, then transferred to the London College of Fashion to pursue his degree in fashion design. In 2014, while still a student, Cowan designed a glittering pink tuxedo that Dazed magazine posted on Instagram. A week later, Lady Gaga wore it to an interview. Miley Cyrus and Rihanna soon made appearances in his clothes. In 2017, he moved to New York City to found his label, which debuted its first collection at New York Fashion Week that year.

In 2018, Cowan was a CFDA/Vogue Fashion Fund finalist. The same year, he partnered with Giuseppe Zanotti on a line of shoes with gold watches for straps, which Cowan showed with his spring 2019 ready-to-wear line at New York Fashion Week.

In 2019, Cowan partnered with Cartoon Network on a collection inspired by The Powerpuff Girls, which was shown in Los Angeles on International Women's Day. Proceeds from the collection benefited nonprofit organisation She's The First. The same year, Lil Nas X wore Cowan’s first ever menswear look, a silver sequined suit with a frilled blouse, to the 2019 MTV Video Music Awards.

In 2020, Cowan released a capsule collection with British online fast fashion retailer ASOS. The same year, for his Spring/Summer 2021 collection, Cowan partnered with Lil Nas X to create a unisex collection, proceeds of which funded a black queer youth initiative within the Loveland Foundation, an organisation founded by Rachel Cargle.

Cowan has shown ready-to-wear collections at New York Fashion week since 2017. The label made its Paris debut showing a spring ready-to-wear line in 2024.

== Personal life ==
In May 2024, Cowan confirmed his then-two-year romantic partnership with singer-songwriter Sam Smith. The couple engaged in 2026.
