= Michael Kors =

American fashion designer (born 1959)

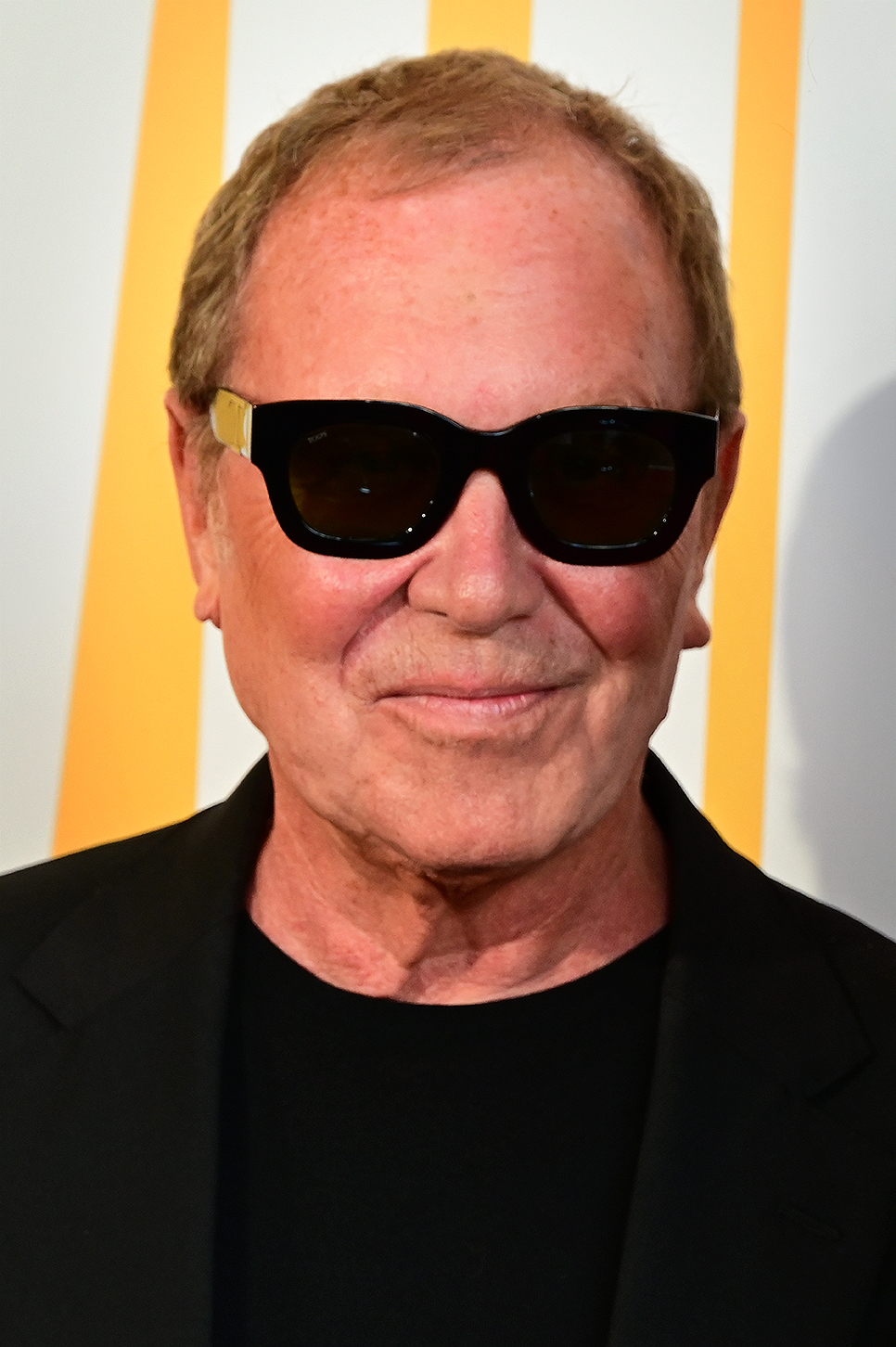
- Kors in 2026
- Born: Karl Anderson Jr. Long Island, New York, U.S.
- Citizenship: American
- Education: Fashion Institute of Technology
- Occupation: Fashion designer
- Spouse: Lance Le Pere (m. 2011)
- Awards: CFDA Womenswear Designer of the Year, 1999; CFDA Lifetime Achievement Award, 2010; CFDA Positive Change Award, 2024
- Website: michaelkors.com

Michael David Kors (born Karl Anderson Jr.; August 9, 1959) is an American fashion designer. He is the chief creative officer of his brand, Michael Kors, which sells men's and women's ready-to-wear, accessories, watches, jewelry, footwear, and fragrance, under his signature Michael Kors Collection, MICHAEL Michael Kors and Michael Kors Mens labels. On January 2, 2019, Michael Kors Holdings Limited officially changed its name to Capri Holdings Limited (NYSE: CPRI). As of December 2025, Michael Kors and Jimmy Choo are the two founder-led brands under Capri Holdings Limited.

== Personal life ==
Kors was born as Karl Anderson Jr. on Long Island, New York. His mother is Jewish and his father was of Swedish descent. His parents are Joan Hamburger (1939-2023), a former model, and her first husband, Karl Anderson Sr. His mother married Bill Kors when her son was 5, and his surname was changed to Kors. His mother told Karl that he could choose a new first name as well and he renamed himself Michael David Kors. He grew up in Merrick, New York, and graduated from John F. Kennedy High School in Bellmore, New York, on Long Island.

Kors married his partner, Lance Le Pere, on August 16, 2011, in Southampton, New York, in The Hamptons.

== Career ==
Kors' affinity for fashion started when he was very young, with his mother theorizing that his interest may have been sparked by his exposure to the apparel industry through her modeling career. Kors, at the age of 5, even redesigned his mother's wedding dress for her second marriage. As a teen, Kors began designing clothes and selling them out of his parents' basement, which he renamed the Iron Butterfly.

In 1977, he enrolled at the Fashion Institute of Technology in New York City. He also took a job at a boutique called Lothar's across from Bergdorf Goodman on 57th Street in Midtown Manhattan, where he started as a salesperson and went on to become both the designer and visual display head for the store, after leaving FIT in 1978.

In 1981, Kors launched his Michael Kors women's label at Bergdorf Goodman. In 1990, the company launched KORS Michael Kors as a licensee. A Chapter 11 filing in 1993, caused by the closure of the licensing partner for KORS Michael Kors, forced him to put the KORS line on hold until 1997.

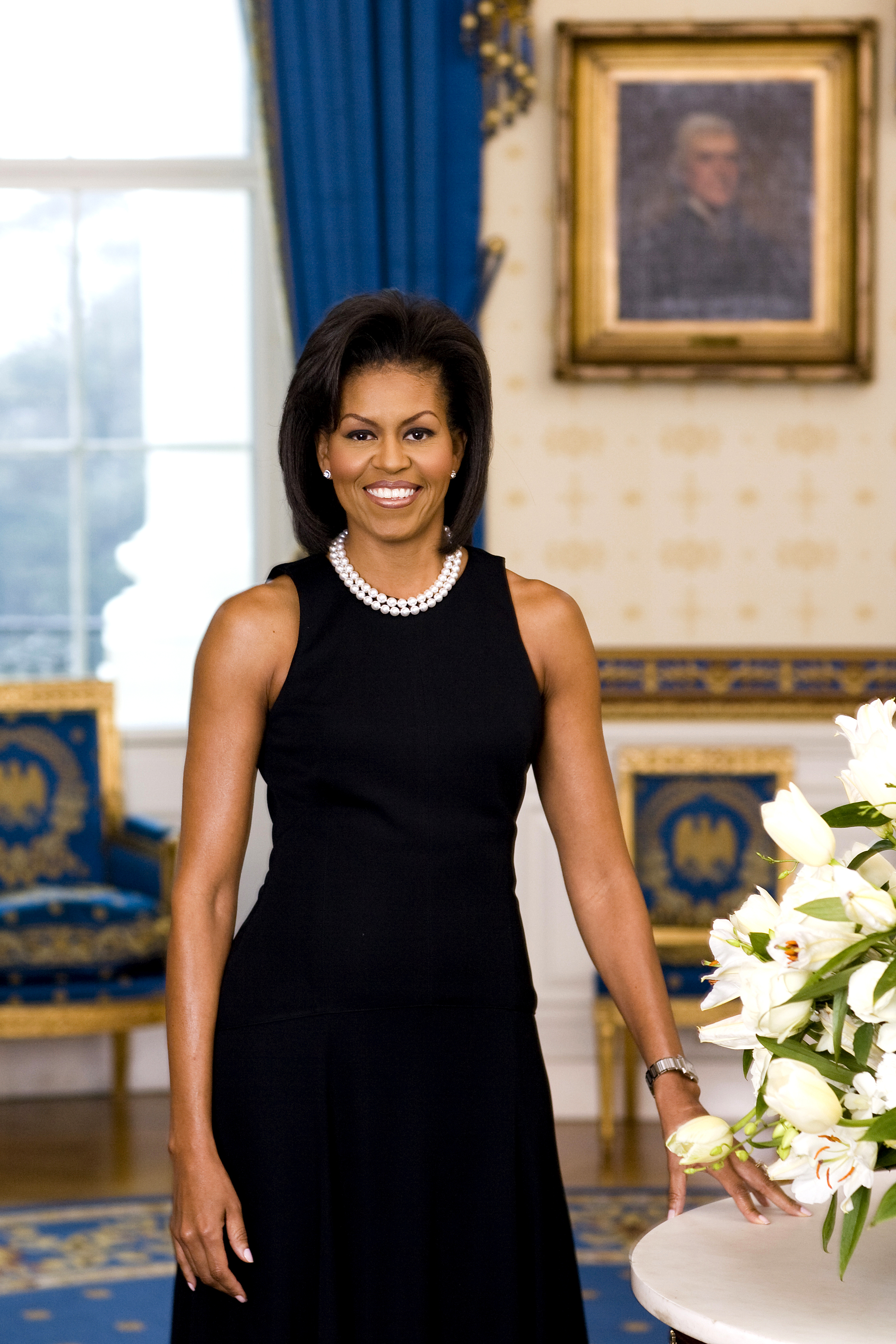
First Lady Michelle Obama's first term official portrait showing her wearing a dress designed by Kors

In 1997, Kors was named the first women's ready-to-wear designer for French luxury fashion house Celine. In his tenure at Celine, Kors designed successful accessories and a critically acclaimed ready-to-wear line. He left Celine in October 2003 to concentrate on his own brand.

In 2002, Kors launched its first line of menswear. In 2004, he launched the MICHAEL Michael Kors and the KORS Michael Kors lines, which included women’s footwear and bags as well as ready-to-wear apparel.

Among the celebrities who have dressed in Kors' designs are Anne Hathaway, Nicole Kidman, Reese Witherspoon, Lupita Nyong'o, Olivia Wilde, Blake Lively, Kate Hudson, Martha Stewart,Lea Michele, Kerry Washington, Rene Russo, Jennifer Lawrence, Taylor Swift, Catherine, Princess of Wales, Hillary Clinton, Angelina Jolie, Jennifer Lopez, Emily Blunt, Ariana DeBose, Vice President Kamala Harris, Heidi Klum, Catherine Zeta-Jones, Sigourney Weaver, and Ciara. Michelle Obama wore a black sleeveless dress from the designer for her first term official portrait as First Lady and later sported Kors again at the 2015 State of the Union address.

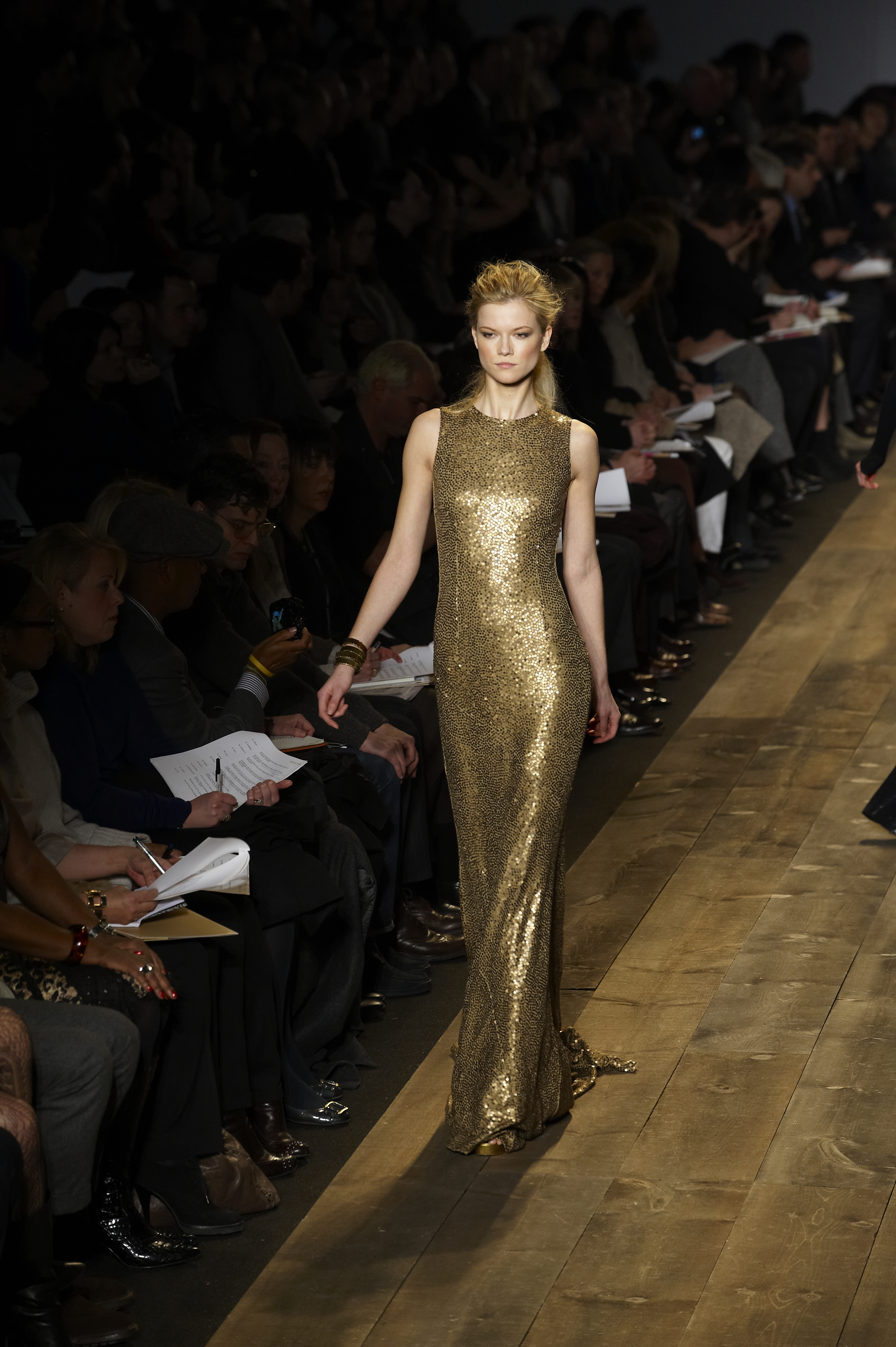
A dress by Michael Kors modeled by Kasia Struss, 2010

Viola Davis wore a custom Michael Kors Collection gown when accepting a Golden Globe for best supporting actress in a motion picture for her role in Fences. Kate Hudson and Olivia Wilde both wore gowns by the designer to the 2016 Golden Globes, and Emily Blunt, nominated for her role in Into the Woods, wore a white custom gown by the designer in 2015. Joan Allen wore his gown when she was nominated for an Academy Award for Best Actress for her role in The Contender. As creative director of Celine, Kors designed many outfits for actresses to wear on screen, including Gwyneth Paltrow in Possession; and Rene Russo in The Thomas Crown Affair.

One of his gowns was worn by Alicia Keys for her performance at Barack Obama's inaugural ball on January 21, 2013.

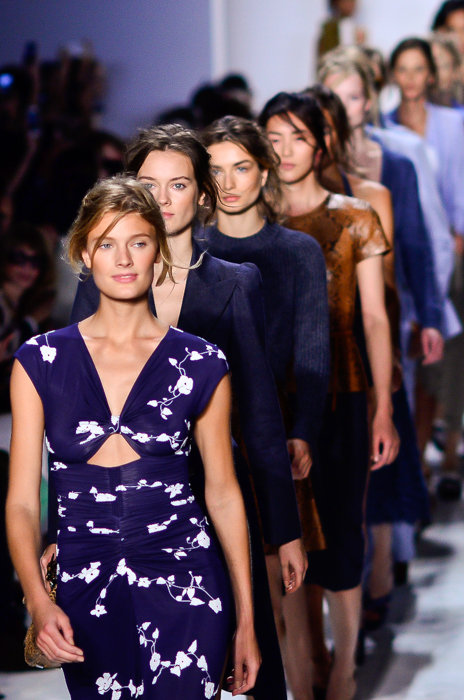
Models Constance Jablonski, Jac Jagaciak, Andreea Diaconu, and Liu Wen among others walking for Michael Kors in 2014

Kors was a judge on the Emmy-nominated reality television program Project Runway, which aired on Bravo for five seasons; subsequent seasons aired on Lifetime. On December 18, 2012, it was announced that Kors would be leaving Project Runway, to be replaced by fellow designer Zac Posen. Kors returned to Project Runway in 2016 as a guest judge on the season 15 finale.

In January 2014, Forbes reported that Kors reached a personal fortune in excess of $1 billion. By that time, Michael Kors Holdings had already "minted two billionaires": Silas Chou and Lawrence Stroll.

Kors celebrated his 40th anniversary in 2021 during lockdown with a filmed runway show on the streets of the Theater District in New York City. Supermodels including Naomi Campbell, Helena Christensen and Shalom Harlow walked the show, along with Bella Hadid, Ashley Graham and Paloma Elsesser.

In 2026, the designer marked the 45th anniversary of his brand with a live runway show at The Metropolitan Opera House in Lincoln Center, New York. Supermodel Christy Turlington walked the show, as did Alex Consani, Amelia Gray and Paloma Elsesser while Uma Thurman, Dakota Fanning, Mary J. Blige and more red carpet favorites watched from the front row. The designer toasted the milestone with an after party at PJ Clarke’s.

== Other honors ==
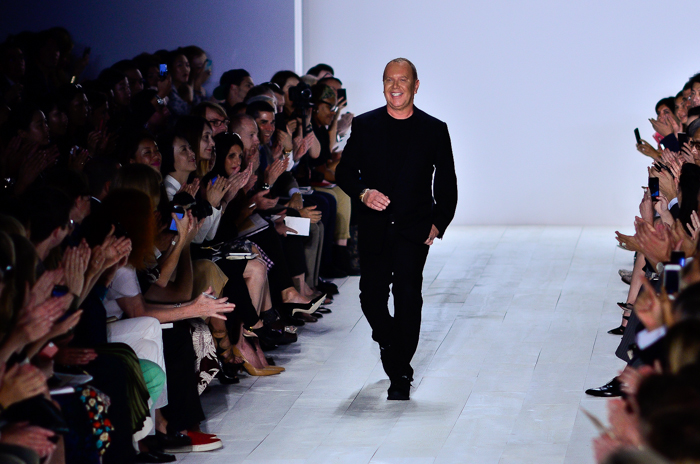
Kors at the conclusion of his Spring/Summer 2014 show at New York Fashion Week, September 2013

- In 2024, Michael Kors received the CFDA’s Positive Change Award for his philanthropic achievements.
- Michael Kors received the Superstar Award at Fashion Group International’s 2022 Annual Night of Stars.
- In 2021, Michael Kors received the InStyle Designer of the Year Award, presented by friend Kate Hudson.
- 2016: The World Food Program USA honored Kors with the McGovern-Dole Leadership award, presented by Vice President Joe Biden.
- 2015: Named a Global Ambassador Against Hunger for the United Nations World Food Programme.
- 2015: God's Love We Deliver dedicated the Michael Kors Building at the non-profit's new SoHo headquarters in honor of Kors' ongoing support.
- 2013: Selected for The Time 100, the magazine's annual list of the 100 most influential people in the world. He also made the New York Observer's list of the 100 Most Influential New Yorkers, under the fashion category, and was named to Out magazine's 2014 Power 50 List.
- 2013: Honored with the 2013 Couture Council Award for Artistry of Fashion by The Couture Council of The Museum at the Fashion Institute of Technology.
- 2013: Kors presented Hillary Rodham Clinton with the first-ever Michael Kors Award for Outstanding Community service.
- 2012: Honored with the Golden Heart Lifetime Achievement Award by God's Love We Deliver, a non-profit organization that distributes fresh meals to people living with HIV/AIDS and other diagnoses, which he has been involved with for over 20 years.
- 2010: Received the Oliver R. Grace Award for Distinguished Service in Advancing Cancer Research, an annual honor bestowed by the Cancer Research Institute, a U.S. nonprofit organization dedicated to advancing immune system-based treatments for cancer.
- 2010: Kors was the youngest recipient ever of the Geoffrey Beene Lifetime Achievement Award from the Council of Fashion Designers of America (CFDA) and received the Fragrance Foundation's FiFi Award for Lifetime Achievement.

== Legal issues ==
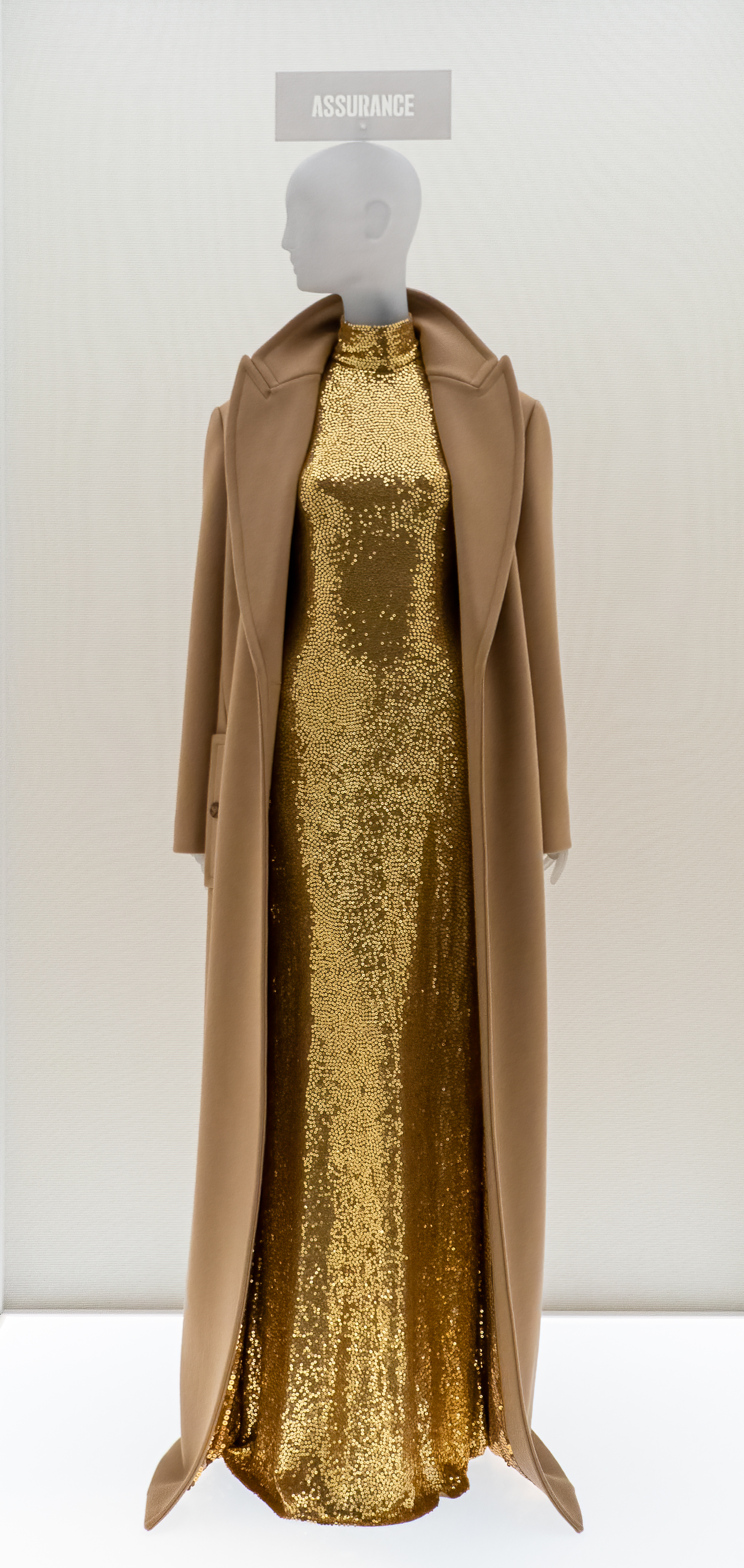
An ensemble Kors designed in 2021–2022 in the Metropolitan Museum of Art exhibition In America: A Lexicon of Fashion

In January 2009, the estate of artist and designer Tony Duquette sued Kors for trademark infringement after Kors allegedly used Duquette's name and images in promoting Kors' 2009 resortwear collection.

In July 2013, he became the second luxury brand, after Tiffany & Co, to sue Costco for falsely claiming in advertisements that they sold his product.

== See also ==
- LGBT culture in New York City
- List of LGBT people from New York City
- New York Fashion Week
- NYC Pride March
