= Santino Rice =

American fashion designer and television personality

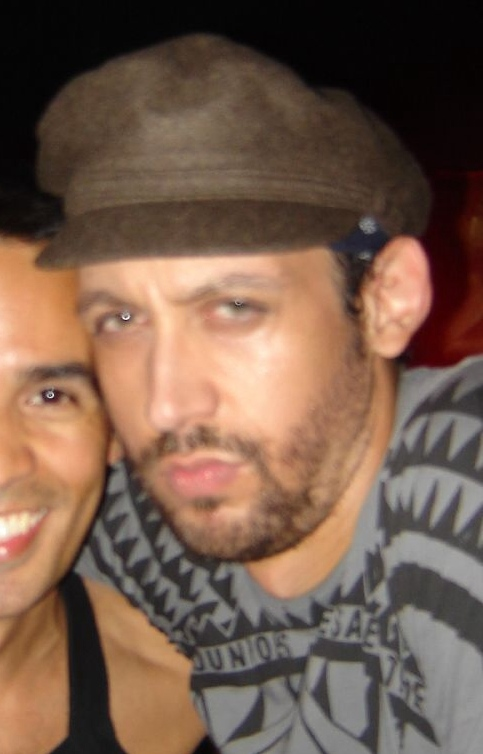
- Rice in July 2006
- Born: Santino Quinto Rice; 1974 or 1975 (age 51–52)
- Education: Fashion Institute of Design and Merchandising
- Occupations: Television personality, fashion designer

Santino Quinto Rice (born 1974 or 1975) is an American fashion designer and television personality, best known for appearing on the reality television series Project Runway and RuPaul's Drag Race.

== Early life and education ==
Santino Quinto Rice was born and grew up at Fifth Street in St. Charles, Missouri, the city where his ancestors lived in early 1800s. His mother is of African-American and Italian background; his father, of Jewish and Native American background. Rice attended a preschool program at Lindenwood College (now Lindenwood University) and then graduated from the Academy of the Sacred Heart (St. Charles).

When he attended St. Charles High School (Missouri), he played basketball, worked for a student newspaper, and gained interest in fashion design. Furthermore, he was the only male in a first-level clothing course and attended second- and third-level courses. As a high school student, he also drove a 1966 Ford Mustang, bought for $1,500 and restored by his father.

With a scholarship offered to him, Rice concurrently attended the Fashion Institute of Design and Merchandising (FIDM; Los Angeles) in 1990s. (Note: Rice was eighteen years old in April 1993 when he attended FIDM.) To further afford tuition for the design school, the restored Mustang was sold for almost tenfold the purchase price later then. After school, he performed voice-overs, appeared as an extra in certain films, and was an assistant costume designer. Also, after arrival in Los Angeles, he worked for other designers. He left St. Charles in 2002 and had not returned by 2006.

== Project Runway season 2 (2005–06) ==
=== Synopsis ===
Rice at age thirty-one first competed in the second season of the American competition reality television series Project Runway. When the season premiered, he was considered "one of the most talented of the bunch" by Jill Radsken of Boston Herald and an "early frontrunner [sic]" of the season.

Before becoming a finalist, Rice had been one of lowest-scored contestants in seven out of eleven total challenges. In the fourth episode, he was considered for elimination due to his performance in the team lingerie challenge and "his tirade against the judges". A competitor Marla Duran "was disappointed with Rice's catty comments about" Duran's all-female team, which included just Diana Eng and Guadalupe Vidal, for the challenge. Nonetheless, he won two of the season's overall pre-finale challenges, two of which were of its first five. Besides winning the season's first challenge, he further won the season's fifth challenge: designing a party dress for socialite Nicky Hilton.

For the Fashion Week finale, after earning a finalist spot, Rice developed his "muted" collection that included an abundance of "rose and lace" and "a brown leather corset with capelike [sic] sleeves." The collection contrasted his prior works critically panned throughout the season as "too loud". To complete his collection, he was instructed two days before the Fashion Week event to design a thirteenth piece. (Note: For the Fashion Week finale, the finalists—Rice, Chloe Dao, and Daniel Vosovic—were assigned to construct twelve outfits for their own collections within five months after the second season's pre-finale taping on their own $8,000 budget. Later, they were assigned the final challenge of the season: with an assistance from an eliminated contestant of a finalist's choosing, build a thirteenth outfit to finish the collection within two days before the Fashion Week show on their own additional $250 budget.)

On the finale, Rice's lack of "brassiness" in his "sleek" Fashion Week collection, compared to his prior works, was noted. The judges praised Rice's creativity but found his finale collection "too safe (and ill-fitting)", wrote Boston Herald. He was eliminated before two other finalists—first runner-up Daniel Vosovic and crowned winner Chloe Dao—making Rice the second runner-up.

=== Reception as a villain ===
As the season progressed, Rice further earned his "villain" reputation for his onscreen "egomaniacal [sic]" personality. Katherine Nguyen of The Orange County Register described him as "talented" and "arrogant". Karla Peterson of The San Diego Union-Tribune noted his "refusal to follow instructions" and imitations of Runway mentor Tim Gunn that had other contestants laughing "until they drool[ed] all over their stretch tweed." Peterson further described Rice as "a towering bundle of ego, skill and hubris".

Rice himself asserted to O'Fallon Journal that he was "confident" rather than "arrogant". On the contrary, he admitted appearing "overconfident and arrogant" throughout most of the season but further asserted that he was more than what he had seemed onscreen. Jeff Daniel of St. Louis Post-Dispatch described Rice as "soft-spoken and modest" amid a January 2006 phone interview with him, contrary to Rice's onscreen persona.

The Seattle Post-Intelligencer noted his "mean-spirited" confessionals, "tantrums" toward the judges, and works "rang[ing] from inspiring to epically disastrous". The publication described him as boldly the series's "first true super-villain", surpassing the preceding season's Wendy Pepper, and as "the funnier contestant" as opposed to "his blander, more talented competition" of the season. Rice told the publication:

I'm not a villain. I'm not a bad guy. I'm a passionate guy who likes to create beautiful things. And I'm on a mission. It's not bad to be driven.

Gunn himself said in 2006:

Santino is extraordinarily talented as a designer. He is equally challenging as a person because he is so needy and he needs to fill the room with his voice and his presence and dominate. I was afraid it was going to enable a lot of unnecessary behaviour.

Clifford Pugh of Toronto Star in October 2006 criticized the series Project Runway for emphasizing more "on brash personalities", like Rice and Wendy Pepper, and less on talent.

=== Reception as a finalist ===
Before Rice became a finalist, the series's very first winner Jay McCarroll found Rice and other three remaining contestants "kind of boring". Nonetheless, McCarroll enjoyed Rice's "arrogant and funny" personality and his somewhat "weird" works as the only works of the season with "a clear point of view." When Rice became one, Lorilee Craker of The Grand Rapids Press perceived Rice's finalist spot as if the producers intentionally carried Rice into the finale not for "his design ability" but rather "his penchant for drama". However, Runway mentor Tim Gunn said, "Producers weigh in only when the judges are at a stalemate, when we see two people, both of whom can or should be out and [the judges] can't come to a collaborative decision." Furthermore, as Gunn asserted, Rice had "been listening more" since the "inspiration" challenge in the eighth episode. (Note: Tim Gunn thought that the elimination of fan favorite Nick Verreos, who finished fifth, was the right judgment. Indeed, Gunn factored in "all the puckering and the uneven seams" of Verreos's dress, which exemplified "amateurism", and Daniel Vosovic's immunity earned from the previous challenge for Verreos's elimination.)

In the first part of the finale, the penultimate episode, Rice displayed his "slightly softer side than before" and revealed his time of living with his best friend's family after losing his job.

Neal Zoren of the Delaware County Daily Times noted Rice's "obvious wit, fashion sense, and creativity" but described his works as "never classic enough". Boston Globe concurred with the results and deemed Rice's collection not much of a "showstopper", despite "a couple of gorgeous dresses". The publication further described his overall work as "conception over construction" and "made for the mannequin, not the actual woman" but noted his artistry and creativity.

Timothy Gunatilaka of Entertainment Weekly wrote that Rice should have won the season instead of Chloe Dao, whose her "sleek and sexy" finale collection Gunatilaka found "safe" rather than an exception to her other "safe" works throughout the season. Gunatilaka further found Rice's finale collection "easily the most elegant of the three" but further noted the judges' "reluctan[ce]" to crown "someone who was too much like" Jay McCarroll, the winner of the preceding season.

=== Retrospective reception ===
Before the fourth season premiered in November 2007, host Heidi Klum and mentor Tim Gunn named Rice "their all-time favorite contestant." Dionne Walker of Associated Press in October 2008 perceived Rice to be "surpassed only by" the "resident villain" and finalist Kenley Collins of the fifth season. Ji Hyun Lee of Examiner.com then in late October of the following year perceived him and Wendy Pepper (season 1) to be surpassed by eventual winner Irina Shabayeva of the sixth season for "her verbal assaults". Rebecca Tamel of Examiner.com in mid-October 2009 named Rice a "token reincarnation of Satan". (Note: Rebecca Tamel of Examiner.com listed also Jeffrey Sebelia (season 3) and Kenley Collins (season 5) as examples of the "token reincarnation of Satan" trope.)

== Project Runway All-Star Challenge (2009) ==
Rice was one of eight Project Runway returnees re-competing on the two-hour Project Runway All-Star Challenge special, which aired on August 20, 2009, on Lifetime network, the same day when the sixth season of Project Runway premiered. He was given a $1,200-budget and designed first three pieces for the red carpet collection intended for the red carpet premiere of a then-upcoming 2009 film Nine starring Nicole Kidman, Penelope Cruz, Marion Cotillard, and Kate Hudson. Then, to complete it, the fourth one made from materials of a restaurant that the returnees dined in. Rice was one of four lowest-scored returnees of the special, resulting in his elimination before the other four highest-scored returnees ("the final four"). (Note: The first runner-up Daniel Vosovic from the second season also competed in the All-Star Challenge special. Vosovic was crowned the winner, earning him $100,000.)

Kelly Lynne criticized Rice's thirteen-piece All-Star "collection of metallic silver slinky lame' ensembles" as "nice but kind of boring and too toned down" and not as good as the Fashion Week collection from Rice's original season. (Note: Kelly Lynne (now Tinsley) also worked for The Ann Arbor News.) Out of 2,029 users taking survey, Rice received 0% votes of the "Who Should Have Won the Project Runway All-Stars?" poll alongside two other returnees—winner Jeffrey Sebelia and third runner-up Mychael Knight, both of the third season. (Note: The first runner-up Korto Momolu of the fifth season received 56% of the votes.) Missy Schwartz of Entertainment Weekly, Lisa Denton of the Chattanooga Times Free Press, and Brooke Cain of The News & Observer were please to see Rice eliminated and unable to become one of the final four.

== Judging in RuPaul's Drag Race (2009–14) ==
Rice had been a permanent judge for the first six seasons (2009–14) of RuPaul's Drag Race and a guest judge for its seventh season (2015). Many fans of the Drag Race franchise considered him "integral", while others noted "his divisive critiques of the [drag] queens regarding their fashion choices on the main stage." In a 2023 YouTube interview, Tammie Brown (season 1) noted Rice "saying these rude things", and Pandora Boxx (season 2) said:

He was terrible and he made me feel horrible and did not relent. Maybe said a couple of nice things but, yeah I'm glad he's not a judge anymore.

On the contrary, Mystique Summers Madison (season 2) in January 2010 considered Rice her "favorite judge" for giving "advice that helped me in the long run" and, in regards to her dresses, for not being "too mean or crazy with me." She further said, "I think he's being judged wrong — he's actually a down-to-earth guy." Rice told Los Angeles Times in the same period:

We're looking for someone who can fill Ru's shoes, who can be the next drag superstar and carry forward the art of drag, and it's a tough one because, still to this day, society and people marginalize gay culture and gay people marginalize drag culture.

As a permanent judge, Rice was succeeded by Ross Matthews and Carson Kressley in the seventh season (2015). However, Rice served as only a guest judge that season.

== Other activities outside Project Runway and RuPaul's Drag Race ==
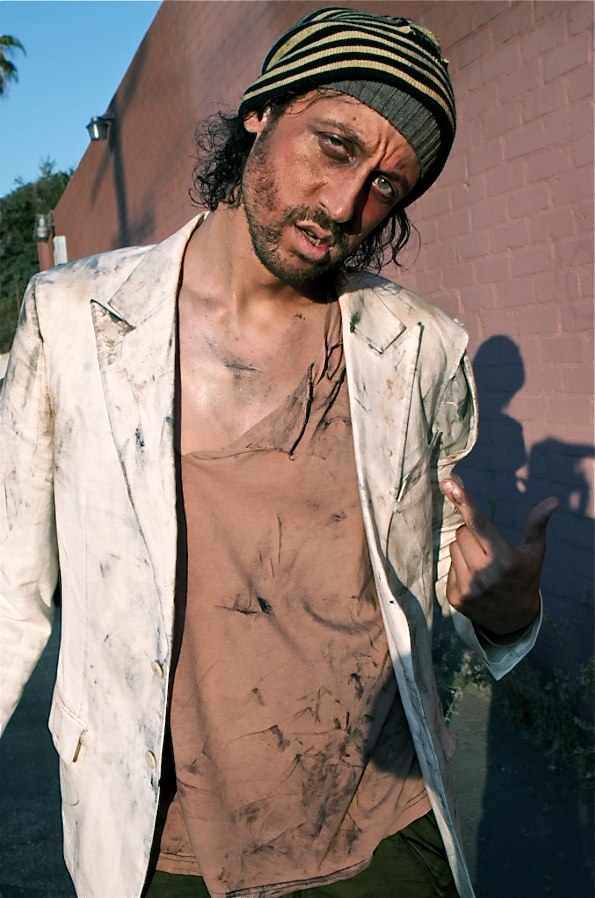
Rice in 2010 in makeup for L.A. Zombie

Throughout 2006 after Project Runway, Rice was one of invited guests and presenters of the 17th GLAAD Media Awards besides Project Runway mentor Tim Gunn and contestants of the second season Andrae Gonzalo and Nick Verreos. He also designed a red carpet dress for SuChin Pak to wear at the 2006 MTV Movie Awards. He then also was briefly among the judging panel alongside Tim Gunn in Los Angeles on casting auditions for the third season of Project Runway. He also was one of judges of the Miss Universe 2006 pageant.

Rice competed in a short-lived 2008 Fox Reality Channel series Gimme My Reality Show! He also portrayed a cameo non-porn role of a homeless man in a 2010 gay pornographic film L.A. Zombie. Rice designed his own costume for that role. Also, he and Runway alumni Austin Scarlett (season 1) hosted a short-lived 2010 Lifetime reality television series On the Road with Austin & Santino in which the unlikely pair with contrasting personalities traveled around the country helping women, especially ones in rural towns, receive fashion makeovers.

Rice attended the 22nd GLAAD Media Awards (2011) as one of its guests. He also appeared in a 2017 episode of The Doctors talk show discussing his 111-day fasting. He tweeted his fasting announcement.

== Personal life ==
In a 2010 interview, when Windy City Times asked him whether he is bisexual, Rice responded:

You can just call me gay but I like men and I am attracted to beautiful women. I didn't like the negativity that was attached to being gay growing up so that is why I have problems with the label.

== On social media ==
=== On the COVID-19 pandemic ===
Amid the COVID-19 pandemic in 2020, more than fifteen reported tweets making vaccines akin to injecting disinfectants, i.e. finding no difference between both types, were posted on Rice's official Twitter account. Rice pinned the tweets on hackers since he lost his iPhone. Furthermore, the tweets "were exaggerated versions of his drafts, likely meant to have fun at his expense," reported Mikelle Street of the Out magazine. Rice further said,

I've tweeted about vaccines and health-related things in the past. [...] The tweets I'm reading that were posted were obviously trying to piss people off. I don't think people should drink bleach or whatever else was insinuated. I understand that it relates to something Trump said but I also see that someone was having fun making people mad today.

Rice deleted those tweets when he regained his Twitter account by late April 2020.

=== On the 2024 US presidential candidates ===
The Out magazine reported in October 2024 Rice's tweet on the X social network: "Calling Kamala Harris r*tarded is offensive to r*tards." Rice clarified in another tweet that his disliking Harris was not misogynistic. Rather he favored a future "intelligent and capable woman President someday" who is not Harris. Furthermore, he supported her rival candidate Donald Trump as the "only one obvious candidate to rebuild America and stabilize the rest of the world". The magazine's reporter Rowan Ashley Smith called Rice's series of politics-related tweets "a masterclass in ultraconservative nonsense posting" and examples of his "far-right Christian Nationalism". The Out magazine reported his Trump tweet receiving "39 likes" and being reposted "27" times by then.

Them magazine reported Rice's tweet on Trump receiving "41 likes" and "89 replies". Them further reported his account having by then "more than 69,000 followers" and a blue check. Rice's Trump tweet, however, received negative responses from other users of the X social network. When the tweet was reposted in response, Drag Race UK contestants The Vivienne wrote "Sashay away", and Lawrence Chaney wrote "You're really unhinged". Them reported their own reposts receiving "much more engagement than the former judge."
