= Verreos =

Verreos is a surname. Notable people with the surname include:

- Nick Verreos (born 1967), American fashion designer, fashion commentator, educator, and author
- Rita Verreos (born 1968), American beauty pageant and reality television contestant
