= Chloe Dao =

American fashion designer and television personality

- ໂຄລອີ ດາວ
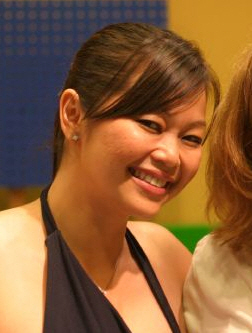
- Chloe Dao at the BlogHer 2007 Chicago
- Born: July 1971 (age 55); Pakse, Laos
- Education: Fashion Institute of Technology (FIT)
- Occupation: Fashion designer
- Television: Project Runway season 2 (winner)
- Spouse: Ken Pursley (m. 2011)

Chloe Dao (Lao: ໂຄລອີ ດາວ; born July 1971) is a Vietnamese-American fashion designer and television personality who lives and works in Houston, Texas, United States. She won the second season of an American reality television series Project Runway with a thirteen-piece collection of women's evening wear.

== Early life and education ==
Chloe Dao was born in Pakse, Laos, the sixth daughter to her ethnically Vietnamese (Kinh) parents. (Two younger sisters were born after her.) She, her parents, and her seven sisters escaped the Viet Cong in 1976, settled for a refugee camp in Thailand, and moved to Houston, Texas, in 1979. To support the family, Dao's mother had three jobs with limited understanding of the English language at the time, and Dao's father worked full-time.

Dao's parents desired her to become a doctor or lawyer. Instead, Chloe gained interest in fashion designing after she watched a CNN program Style with Elsa Klensch at age ten. She attended a school in the Aldine Independent School District. As a teenager, she modified vintage clothes from second-hand shops, and her first original work was her own prom dress. Then Dao attended the University of Houston as a business marketing major for three semesters and then Houston Community College under its fashion design program for one semester. She earned from the Fashion Institute of Technology a degree in pattern making and then worked for couture designers Madame Rossule and Melinda Eng amid her eight-year stay in New York City.

== Project Runway season 2 (2005–06) ==
=== Synopsis ===
A 34-year-old entrepreneur and women's wear designer at the time, Dao entered the second season of Project Runway. She also was one of sixteen contestants and the only Texan of that season. Throughout Project Runway before the finale, she had won two challenges. In the final pre-Fashion Week challenge in the eleventh episode, Dao's "dove-gray" dress intended for supermodel Iman was criticized as "safe" and lost to Daniel Vosovic—whose dress was also what judge Nina Garcia deemed "safe" and "boring"—making him a finalist. Dao was one of two contenders for elimination, but then she secured her spot as one of top three. (Note: Kara Janx finished fourth when she was eliminated over Dao.)

For the Fashion Week, Dao's collection included several dresses with "puffed sleeves", "silhouettes with open backs", and brown pants "with a lace bodice and puffed-laceover [sic]". The collection also contained thirteen pieces total, (Note: For the Fashion Week finale, the finalists—Dao, Daniel Vosovic, and Santino Rice—were assigned to construct twelve outfits for their own collections within five months after the second season's pre-finale taping on their own $8,000 budget. Later, they were assigned the final challenge of the season: with an assistance from an eliminated contestant of a finalist's choosing, build a thirteenth outfit to finish the collection within two days before the Fashion Week show on their own additional $250 budget.) including "minidresses and short skirts" in "chocolate brown, pearl blue and sea green" colors. Dao chose Diana Eng, one of eliminated contestants of the season, as her assistant to finish the thirteenth outfit assigned to complete the collection.

Dao won the season against the first runner-up Daniel Vosovic and the second runner-up Santino Rice. For that, she further earned $100,000 to start her clothing line, a $24,000 silver Saturn Sky roadster—coupé sports car—that she received in July 2006, an Elle magazine coverage, and a mentorship with Banana Republic. To use the mentorship, she contacted the Banana Republic's design team via phone.

=== Reception ===
When the second season originally aired, Dao's win surprised "many viewers", said Jay Bobbin of Zap2It. Karla Peterson of The San Diego Union-Tribune named Dao potentially "the most down-to-earth reality show contestant ever" by the end of January 2006. Timothy Gunatilaka of Entertainment Weekly found her not deserving to win as second runner-up Santino Rice, whose finale collection Gunatilaka admired the most out of three. Gunatilaka further found Dao "too safe" throughout the season and her collection "sleek and sexy" but "also safe" and reminiscent of Banana Republic. He further wrote about her win that "corporate-speak beat out true creativity."

Tenley Woodman of Boston Herald named her "the most boring contestant" and found her collection "less than exciting" when she won. Nevertheless, Woodman noted "her business sense and aptitude for understanding women's desires in clothing" as judges' reasons (Note: In an interview with The Minnesota Star Tribune, a Project Runway judge Nina Garcia noted Dao's viewpoint and "business sense" and found some of Dao's works made throughout the second season "very memorable".) to crown her over two other finalists, despite being their "safe and productive choice", contrary to the previous season's "outrageous winner" Jay McCarroll.

Sylvia Rubin of San Francisco Chronicle contributed Dao's "weeks of steady nerves (until the very end), consistent vision and great technical skills" to her win. Dao and another finalist Daniel Vosovic were considerably "fan favorites" at the time, reported Jill Radsken of Boston Herald. Neal Zoren of the Delaware County Daily Times praised her works as "creative" with "smooth lines and smooth fabrics" but without senselessly using over-the-top elements.

Jean Scheidnes and Sarah Lindner of the Austin American-Statesman noted the series's portrayal of Dao as an "underdog" and praised her as someone to root "for all along". Scheidnes further "found most of her designs quietly chic, cleverly detailed and flattering to the female form" and contributed "her business acumen", "visual creativity", and "lack of personal drama" to her win.

Before she became a finalist, the series's very first winner Jay McCarroll found all the four remaining contestants, including Dao herself, "kind of boring". (Note: This would include the fourth-place contestant Kara Janx. Nonetheless, Jay McCarroll enjoyed Santino Rice's "arrogant and funny" personality and somewhat "weird" works for being the only works of the season with "a clear point of view.") A Boston Globe critic found all three finalists' collections shown in the Fashion Week "disappointing". Boston Globe further noted Dao's "overly shiny" evening gowns and compared "some of her fabrics" to a "wallpaper" of a "grandmother's bathroom." However, the publication noted "creativity" not being factored into the judges' decision on crowning a winner and Dao's "dresses" not requiring a "story" but rather being, said the series's judge Michael Kors, her "statement [sic]".

The series's mentor and designer Tim Gunn remarked in 2006 that Dao's win was "based on her performance throughout the whole season and not on the collection she showed." Gunn further said, "She's a great sportswear designer, what was with all the evening wear?" In the following year 2007, Gunn named her the most impressive out of the series's first three winners.

=== Retrospective ===
In 2014, Robin Givham of The Washington Post noted Dao's unwillingness "to become a fashion star", especially for "a Seventh Avenue showroom or the stress of negotiating with national retailers", but rather settle in her hometown Houston to grow her own business. Givham further noted Dao's long-term success as, like other some Top Chef alumni and some other Project Runway winners, "local, closely aligned with the customer and especially hands-on," unlike Christian Siriano, the winner of the fourth season, whom Givham considered an "outlier".

== Boutique store career ==
=== Lot 8 (2000–12) ===
When she returned to Houston in 2000, Dao and her sister Kim established in Rice Village her boutique Lot 8, named after being one of the eight daughters of, i.e. having seven sisters in, her family. To establish Lot 8, Chloe used her $70,000 investment—including her $15,000 savings, Kim's contributions, loans from her parents, and her credit cards—for space renovations, "equipment, fixtures[,] and merchandise."

Via Lot 8, she sold clothes that she had made by 2005, which represented at least thirty percent of Lot 8. She also sold third-party designers' clothes and accessories for men and women. To further help Chloe support Lot 8, Chloe's youngest sister Sydney, the eighth daughter in the family, had managed press relations, sales, and paperwork. Her mother, whose work ethic as a seamstress and an alteration shop owner influenced Chloe, and her aunt tailored clothes for the store. Chloe's another sister Christina was a hairstylist who operated a hair salon that Chloe opened in 2006.

Instead of moving out to New York City, she remained in Houston but temporarily closed Lot 8 briefly in early March 2006 for store expansion that she developed for six months prior. Throughout the prior year 2005 before Project Runway, Lot 8 earned a revenue of $400,000, including a net income of $100,000. Her Project Runway appearance contributed to an increase in her business performance but also her remaining stock almost exhausted.

=== First Dao Chloe Dao store (2012–2023) ===
The store closed and took down its own "Lot 8" sign in January 2012. In early February, the following month, it reopened and was renamed to Dao Chloe Dao. By then, its size was halved amid store renovations, and its interior switched to "a cozy, playful boutique décor." As of April 2014, Jeanie Markel of Examiner.com placed the store fourth out of her top five boutiques in Houston, Texas. The Rice Village branch closed down permanently in February 2023.

==== COVID-19 pandemic (2020) ====
On March 18, 2020, Dao temporarily closed her eponymous boutique amid the COVID-19 pandemic and operated the business throughout the rest of that week by appointments only. (Note: In June 2020, Melissa Aguilar of the Houston Chronicle listed Dao Chloe Dao as one of places to shop.) She offered a ten-percent discount for online orders via her eponymous official website.

Dao became one of the first designers starting to make masks in Houston amid the pandemic. By the following week, she had given away without charge about 150 surgical masks that she and her staff made daily to certain customers. Of her customers, a Floridan medical clinic requested one hundred masks, and another medical office requested around three hundred.

Dao's cloth face masks were made of 100% cotton with a pouch storing another fabric piece intended "for extra protection" but were not FDA-approved. The whole team had worn protection gloves for mask handling before distribution, yet she recommended the masks be washed before use. She also received $10 per user donation via her official website to financially support her masks. Her cloth face masks were retailed $14–$18 at her official website.

By mid-April 2020, Dao and her team had given out at least three thousand masks, including 150 to Texas Children's Hospital, 250 to Hope Clinic, and plenty of others to the Houston Methodist Hospital and St. Jude in Los Angeles.

By June 2020, Dao had donated and sold thousands of masks since March. She also designed a limited-edition Safely Sip Mask, which contained "four layers of protective fabric", "a nose wire" intended for custom-fitting, and "a hidden slot" for a straw to be inserted and used to "sip a drink without removing the mask." The limited-edition Mask retailed at $25.

=== Second Dao Chloe Dao store (2021–present) ===
In early 2021, Dao opened the second store branch at an M-K-T building in Houston Heights. The store started out with cocktail and evening dresses and units of the increasingly popular Safely Sip Mask.

== Other post-Project Runway activities ==
Dao designed an ultrasoft leather clever bag, dubbed the "Chloe bag", "in a bright turquoise blue with vertical stripes in the middle and the phrase 'Carry On' stitched on the bag," wrote the Associated Press. The leather bag was sold to celebrities for $595 via the Project Runway official website in summer 2006. (Note: A canvas version of the "Chloe bag" was sold for $95 online.) She designed also the costumes for nine "Babes of Anime" attending the 2007 New York Comic Con event (February 24). She also launched her ten-piece contemporary sportswear collection titled "Simply Chloe Dao"—which "include[d] tops, dresses, blazers and pants" retailing $30–75—on May 10 of the same year via QVC. By November 2007, her QVC line had been already sold out.

Dao designed also "cases for cell phones, laptops[,] and other mobile devices" in 2007 for a company Pacific Design (Austin, Texas). The cases were sold online on Pacific Design's official website and then, starting from autumn that same year, distributed to Circuit City, eBags, and other retailers, ranging $19.99–$29.99. The available prints for the line were "a bright psychedelic floral; a houndstooth pattern made up of white stiletto heels; and a unisex print that's bold and colorful."

By May 2008, Dao had still remained in Houston, but she had frequently gone business trips to New York City, Los Angeles, and Chicago and appeared on QVC to continually sell her Simply Chloe Dao line. Up to August 2009, she had displayed her designs at a Smithsonian Museum exhibit and secured her multiple sponsorships. As of October 2010, she also had designed products for Nuo, a label distributing "laptop bags and other lifestyle accessories," and designed custom-made wedding dresses. She then expanded her increasingly popular Nuo-produced line by releasing yellow, blue, and purple prints, retailing normally $49.99–$120. By December 2012, the full line was then exclusive to websites of Staples Inc., Kohl's, and Amazon.

Up to April 2012, Dao's designs appeared in The Today Show, Access Hollywood, American Morning, and The View. She was one of the judges and of the producers for the first season (2013) of Project Runway Vietnam. In the seventh season (2014) of a TLC reality television series The Little Couple, Dao fitted a wedding dress made for the season's participant Dr. Jennifer "Jen" Arnold, who eventually wore it for her wedding vow renewal ceremony with her husband Bill Klein. (Note: Dao custom-made the wedding dress for around a month to help Jen Arnold conceal her own scar on her shoulder, which resulted from a surgery she underwent.)

External image
- February 16, 2021 post at Facebook

Dao posted on Facebook a photo of a table reused as a tent made by one of her sisters Jasmine amid a power outage that Chloe experienced. It also contained a mattress underneath. By mid-February 2021, the photo had received over two million views and had been shared at least 22,000 times.

== Personal life ==
Dao met her boyfriend Ken Pursley eleven days before the taping of Project Runway in 2005. After six years of being together, they both married in the Bahamas in 2011.

== Notes ==
Preceded by Jay McCarroll	Project Runway winner Chloe Dao	Succeeded by Jeffrey Sebelia
