= Number Lab =

- Industry: Fashion
- Predecessor: 429 Life
- Founded: 2004; 22 years ago
- Founder: Greg Lawrance; Luis Fernandez
- Headquarters: United States

Number Lab was an early athleisure fashion brand, which was recognized for its contribution to the category by being chosen as a finalist for the Ecco Domani Fashion Foundation award and in the International Woolmark Prize competition (in the menswear category). In 2012, Number Lab was selected to join the Council of Fashion Designers of America (CFDA) fashion program in 2012 alongside CFDA winner Johnathan Simikhai, Ecco Domani Fashion Foundation Award Winner Timo Weiland and Project Runway's Daniel Vosovic.

== Men's fashion ==
Number Lab, founded by former architect Luis Fernandez and Greg Lawrance, was originally launched under the trade name 429 Life in 2004 and changed its brand name to Number Lab in 2008. At that time, RLX, Zegna Sport, Prada Sport and Number Lab (429) existed in the nascent "athleisure" sector. Number Lab was nominated and selected as a finalist for the Ecco Domani Fashion Foundation award for the menswear category and the International Woolmark Prize competition.

In 2012, Number Lab was chosen to join the Council of Fashion Designers of America (CFDA) fashion incubator in company with CFDA winner Johnathan Simikhai, Ecco Domani Fashion Foundation Award Winner Timo Weiland, Burkman Bros and Project Runway's Daniel Vosovic. Other notable CFDA program members include Prabal Gurung, Bibhu Mohapatra and Waris Ahluwalia-House of Waris.

In 2012, Annie Leibowitz photographed Number Lab designs on actor Jonathan Groff for a two-page feature in the July issue of Vanity Fair.

Number Lab hosted presentations and runway shows during Mercedes-Benz New York Fashion Week which were held at venues in New York City including Milk Studios and The Standard Hotel. Number Lab also collaborated with corporate partners Gillette, W Hotels and M·A·C Cosmetics to co-finance its runway shows. In 2011, Number Lab was invited to show at Aspen Fashion Week and in 2012, E! Entertainment Network covered the company's Fall-Winter 2012 runway show at Milk Studios. In 2011, the company opened its first brick-and-mortar location in New York City.
