= Project Runway season 2 =

Project Runway
- Season 2
- Region 1 DVD cover
- No. of tasks: 12
- No. of contestants: 16
- Winner: Chloe Dao
- No. of episodes: 14

Release
- Original network: Bravo
- Original release: December 7, 2005 – March 8, 2006

Season chronology
- ← Previous; Season 1 Next → Season 3

The second season of Bravo's Project Runway, a reality competition for fashion designers, premiered on December 7, 2005. Following a nationwide search earlier in the year, sixteen designers were chosen as semi-finalists and brought to New York City in June 2005. After the first challenge, called "Road To The Runway", fourteen went on to compete as finalists. The winning designer, Chloe Dao, received $100,000 in seed money to help launch her own line, a 2007 Saturn Sky, a spread in ELLE magazine, and a mentorship with the Banana Republic Design Team. Winning alongside Dao was her model, Grace Kelsey, who received the ELLE magazine spread. Michael Kors and Nina Garcia returned as judges for the second season. The fourth judging seat rotated each week, based on the challenge. Tim Gunn, fashion chair at Parsons The New School for Design, returned as a mentor for the designers.

Kara Janx later appeared in Project Runway: All Stars in 2012, where she finished 7th out of 13. Andrae Gonzalo, in the same year, competed in the second season of the All Stars edition placing 10th out of 13. In 2016, Daniel Franco competed in the fifth season of the All Stars edition, placing 12th out of 13. Third place contestant Santino Rice would later become one of the judges of another reality show, RuPaul's Drag Race.

== Contestants ==
Contestant	Age	Hometown	Finish	Outcome
John Wade	24	Los Angeles, California	Episode 1	15th place
Heidi Standridge	25	Atlanta, Georgia	Episode 1	15th place
Kirsten Ehrig	37	Los Angeles, California	Episode 2	14th place
Raymundo Baltazar	24	Los Angeles, California	Episode 3	13th place
Daniel Franco	31	Los Angeles, California	Episode 4	12th place
Guadalupe Vidal	29	Los Angeles, California	Episode 5	11th place
Marla Duran	51	Allentown, Pennsylvania	Episode 6	9th place
Diana Eng	22	Jacksonville, Florida	Episode 6	9th place
Emmett McCarthy	42	New York, New York	Episode 7	8th place
Zulema Griffin	28	New York, New York	Episode 8	7th place
Andrae Gonzalo	32	Los Angeles, California	Episode 9	6th place
Nick Verreos	38	Los Angeles, California	Episode 10	5th place
Kara Janx	29	Johannesburg, South Africa	Episode 11	4th place
Santino Rice	30	Los Angeles, California	Episode 14	3rd place
Daniel Vosovic	24	Grand Rapids, Michigan	Episode 14	Runner-up
Chloe Dao	33	Houston, Texas	Episode 14	Winner

(ages listed are the designers' ages at the time the show was taped in the summer of 2005.)

Daniel F. had been a competitor in the first season and was eliminated in that season's first episode. Determined to show that the judges "made a mistake" in eliminating him so soon, he returned to the nationwide tryouts with samples from his own design line. The evaluation panel at the tryouts decided to give him one more chance and brought him back as a contestant for season two.

The 16 models competing for an ELLE spread in the second season were:

Contestant	Hometown	Outcome
Alyssa Daugherty	Oil City, PA	16th place
Maria Lucia Santiago	?	15th place
Melissa Braiser	New York, NY	14th place
Allison McAtee	Erie, PA	13th place
Claudia	Germany	12th place
Eliza Jane	San Francisco, CA	11th place
Cara Roberts	Darien, CT	10th place
Lesley Ann Williams	?	9th place
Shannon Fluet	Boston, MA	8th place
Tarah Rodgers	North Carolina	7th place
Danyelle Vilmenay	Baltimore, MD	6th place
Rachael Hartzog	?	5th place
Eden Henderson	Queens, NY	4th place
Heather Brown	?	3rd place
Rebecca Holliday	Savannah, GA	Runner-up
Grace Kelsey	San Diego, CA	Winner

=== Designers ===
Elimination Chart
Designers	1	2	3	4	5	6	7	8	9	10^{1}	11	14	Eliminated Episode
Chloe	IN	WIN	IN	LOW	HIGH	HIGH	HIGH	HIGH	HIGH	WIN	LOW	WINNER	12 – Finale
Daniel V.	IN	IN	IN	WIN	IN	WIN	IN	WIN	WIN	IN	WIN	RUNNER UP	12 – Finale
Santino	WIN	HIGH	HIGH	LOW	WIN	LOW	LOW	LOW	LOW	LOW	HIGH	3RD PLACE	12 – Finale
Kara	IN	IN	LOW	LOW	IN	IN	LOW	LOW	HIGH	HIGH	OUT		11 - What's Your Line?
Nick	IN	IN	WIN	LOW	HIGH	LOW	IN	IN	LOW	OUT			10 – Makeover
Andrae	IN	LOW	LOW	HIGH	IN	WIN	IN	HIGH	OUT				9 – Flower Power
Zulema	IN	LOW	IN	HIGH	IN	IN	WIN	OUT					8 - Inspiration
Emmett	IN	IN	IN	LOW	IN	HIGH	OUT						7 – On Thin Ice
Diana	LOW	IN	IN	HIGH	LOW	OUT							6 – Window Shopping
Marla	IN	IN	LOW	HIGH	LOW	OUT							6 – Window Shopping
Guadalupe	IN	IN	IN	HIGH	OUT								5 – Social Scene
Daniel F.	LOW	HIGH	IN	OUT									4 – Team Lingerie
Raymundo	IN	IN	OUT										3 – All Dolled Up
Kirsten	IN	OUT											2 – Clothes Off Your Back
Heidi	OUT												1 – Road to Runway
John	OUT												1 – Road to Runway

- ^Note 1: Although Daniel had one of the lowest scores for the challenge, he was automatically safe as he had immunity.

The designer won Project Runway season 2.
The designer won that challenge.
The designer had the second highest score for that challenge.
The designer had one of the highest scores for that challenge.
The designers had one of the lowest scores for that challenge.
The designer was in the bottom two, but was not eliminated.
The designer lost and was eliminated from the competition.

=== Models ===
Elimination Chart
Model	1	2	3	4	5	6	7	8	9	10	11	13	14
Grace	CD	CD	CD	CD	CD	CD	CD	CD	CD	CD	CD	CD	WINNER
Rebecca	DF	DV	DV	DV	DV	DV	DV	DV	DV	DV	DV	DV	OUT
Heather	SR	SR	SR	SR	SR	SR	SR	SR	SR	SR	SR	SR	OUT
Eden	KJ	KJ	KJ	KJ	KJ	KJ	KJ	KJ	KJ	KJ	KJ	OUT	
Rachael	ZG	ZG	ZG	ZG	ZG	ZG	ZG	NV	NV	NV	OUT		
Danyelle	AG	AG	AG	AG	AG	AG	AG	AG	AG	OUT			
Tarah	NV	NV	NV	NV	NV	NV	NV	ZG	OUT				
Shannon	DE	EM	EM	EM	EM	EM	EM	OUT					
Lesley Ann	RB	DE	DE	DE	DE	DE	OUT						
Cara	MD	MD	MD	MD	MD	MD	OUT						
Eliza	GV	GV	GV	GV	GV	OUT							
Claudia	KE	DF	DF	DF	OUT								
Allison	JW	RB	RB	OUT									
Melissa	DV	KE	OUT										
Maria	EM	WD											
Alyssa	HS	OUT											

The model was the winner of Project Runway season 2.
The model won the challenge.
The model wore the losing designers outfit.
The model was brought back into the competition.
The model withdrew from the competition.
The model was out of Project Runway season 2.

- Allison was originally eliminated in episode 2, but then was brought back after Maria withdrew.
- In episode 10, the models were not used in the challenge.

Designer legend

- Andrae Gonzalo: AG
- Chloe Dao: CD
- Daniel Franco: DF
- Daniel Vosovic: DV
- Diana Eng: DE
- Emmett McCarthy: EM
- Guadalupe Vidal: GV
- Heidi Standridge: HS
- John Wade: JW
- Kara Janx: KJ
- Kirsten Ehrig: KE
- Marla Duran: MD
- Nick Verreos: NV
- Raymundo Baltazar: RB
- Santino Rice: SR
- Zulema Griffin: ZG

== Episodes ==
=== Episode 1: Road to the Runway ===
Original Airdate: December 7, 2005

Before arriving in New York, the 16 contestants being considered for positions in this season's competing cast were given six yards of plain white muslin, $20, and one week to create an outfit that best represents who they are as a fashion designer. After arriving, the 16 contestants found that only 14 positions were available in the Parsons workroom and thus two would be eliminated at the runway judging.

- Judges: Heidi Klum, Nina Garcia, Michael Kors

WINNER: Santino
ELIMINATED: Heidi & John

=== Episode 2: Clothes Off Your Back ===
Original Airdate: December 7, 2005

Designers made an outfit using only the clothes they were wearing at the moment the challenge was announced. They had one day to complete their designs. This episode is best remembered for Andrae's tear-filled panic attack on the runway, and the judges relatively unfeeling response.

- Judges: Heidi Klum, Nina Garcia, Michael Kors
- Guest Judge: Diane von Fürstenberg

WINNER: Chloe
ELIMINATED: Kirsten

=== Episode 3: All Dolled Up ===
Original Airdate: December 14, 2005

Designers created a life-sized outfit for the My Scene collection. The winning designer's outfit would be duplicated for the My Scene collection. The designers had a budget of $150 and two days to complete the design.

- Judges: Heidi Klum, Nina Garcia, Michael Kors
- Guest Judge: Lily Martinez

WINNER: Nick
ELIMINATED: Raymundo

=== Episode 4: Team Lingerie ===
Original Airdate: December 21, 2005

Designers created a lingerie line consisting of three looks. A team event with four teams, each with a lead designer and two assistants. The designers had a budget of $200 and one day to complete the collection.

Team	Team Leader	Team Members (in the order of being chosen)
1	Daniel V.	Andrae, Zulema
2	Daniel F.	Chloe, Kara
3	Santino	Nick, Emmett
4	Diana	Guadalupe, Marla

- Judges: Heidi Klum, Nina Garcia
- Guest Judges: Cynthia Rowley (sitting in for Michael Kors), Alessandra Ambrosio

WINNER: Daniel V.
ELIMINATED: Daniel F.

=== Episode 5: Social Scene ===
Original Airdate: January 4, 2006

Designers created a party dress for socialite Nicky Hilton. The designers had a budget of $150 and two days to complete the designs.

- Judges: Heidi Klum, Nina Garcia, Michael Kors
- Guest Judge: Nicky Hilton

WINNER: Santino
ELIMINATED: Guadalupe

=== Episode 6: Window Shopping ===
Original Airdate: January 11, 2006

Designers created a day-to-evening ensemble for Banana Republic. A team event with five teams of two. Both designers on the losing team were eliminated. Each team had to finish their garment in one day. After that, all teams went to Banana Republic and each had to make a window that showed the idea of the dress; they had 30 minutes to buy all the materials they needed for the display and an hour to finish. The winner was chosen by votes from Banana Republic clients.

The teams were:

- Chloe and Emmett
- Daniel V. and Andrae
- Kara and Zulema
- Santino and Nick
- Diana and Marla

- Judges: Heidi Klum, Nina Garcia, Michael Kors
- Guest Judge: Deborah Lloyd

WINNERS: Andrae & Daniel V.
ELIMINATED: Diana & Marla

=== Episode 7: On Thin Ice ===
Original Airdate: January 18, 2006

Designers created a figure skating outfit for 2006 Olympic silver medalist Sasha Cohen. The designers had a budget of $150 and two days to complete the design.

- Judges: Heidi Klum, Michael Kors
- Guest Judges: Anne Slowey (sitting in for Nina Garcia), Sasha Cohen

WINNER: Zulema
ELIMINATED: Emmett

=== Episode 8: Inspiration ===
Original Airdate: January 25, 2006

Designers took photos around New York and picked one to be an inspiration for an outfit. The designers had a budget of $100 and one day to complete the outfit.

This episode is most notable for Zulema's "Model Walk Off." Prior to this episode, all the winning designers stuck with their original models when given the chance to change by Heidi. Zulema stunned everyone when she not only announced she was changing models, but also making this decision by picking three girls to have a "walk off." She chose the eliminated Emmett's model Shannon, Andrae's model Danyelle, and Nick's model Tarah for consideration. She switched to Tarah, which left Rachael with Nick and eliminated Shannon.

- Judges: Heidi Klum, Nina Garcia, Michael Kors
- Guest Judge: Jay McCarroll

WINNER: Daniel V.
ELIMINATED: Zulema

=== Episode 9: Flower Power ===
Original Airdate: February 1, 2006

Designers created a dress using only natural materials purchased in the New York Flower District. The designers had a budget of $100 and one hour for the purchases.

- Judges: Heidi Klum, Nina Garcia, Michael Kors
- Guest Judges: Mark Badgley and James Mischka.

WINNER: Daniel V.
ELIMINATED: Andrae

=== Episode 10: Makeover ===
Original Airdate: February 8, 2006

Designers created a new look to make over a fellow contestant, who then modeled the new look on the runway. Chloe designed for Nick, Nick designed for Daniel V., Daniel V. designed for Chloe, Kara designed for Santino, and Santino designed for Kara.

- Judges: Heidi Klum, Nina Garcia, Michael Kors
- Guest Judge: Freddie Leiba

WINNER: Chloe
ELIMINATED: Nick

=== Episode 11: What's Your Line? ===
Original Airdate: February 15, 2006

Designers made an evening dress for supermodel Iman. The evening dress also reflected the line which the designers will show at Olympus Fashion Week.

- Judges: Heidi Klum, Nina Garcia, Michael Kors
- Guest Judge: Iman

WINNER: Daniel V.
ELIMINATED: Kara

=== Episode 12: Reunion ===
Original Airdate: February 22, 2006

All of the designers gathered for a reunion hosted by Tim Gunn and Heidi Klum on the eve of New York Fashion Week at which the final three designers will display their collections.

=== Episode 13: Finale – Part 1 ===
Original Airdate: March 1, 2006

The three final designers were shown at home when Tim Gunn visited them, and then returned to New York to prepare their collections for showing at New York Olympus Fashion Week. Back in New York, they were surprised to find out that they had to complete one final challenge: an additional garment that they each had to design with the aid of one eliminated designer of their choice. Nick, Andrae, and Diana returned to help Daniel V., Santino, and Chloe, respectively.

=== Episode 14: Finale – Part 2 ===
Original Airdate: March 8, 2006

Chloe, Daniel V., and Santino displayed their final collections of thirteen pieces at New York Olympus Fashion Week.

- Judges: Heidi Klum, Nina Garcia, Michael Kors
- Guest Judge: Debra Messing

WINNER: Chloe
ELIMINATED: Daniel V. (first runner-up) & Santino (second runner-up)

== Reception ==
Joy Press of The Village Voice called this season "a letdown" from, i.e. liked it less than, the previous one "both in terms of the talent (minor) and the drama (again, minor)". Before the Fashion Week, the very first winner of the series Jay McCarroll found the finalists of the season (in addition to the fourth-placed Kara Janx) "kind of boring" but personally enjoyed Rice's "arrogant and funny" personality and his somewhat "weird" works as the only works of the season with "a clear point of view." Jen Chung of Gothamist found the eliminated Kara Janx "not that impressive as a designer throughout the process" and was "pleased" to see the remaining three become finalists of the season.

Neal Zoren of the Delaware County Daily Times favored Chloe Dao as someone Zoren would hire to design clothes for him and "liked the styling of Daniel Vesovic". Zoren noted Santino Rice's "obvious wit, fashion sense, and creativity" but found Rice's works "never classic enough".

Timothy Gunatilaka of Entertainment Weekly wrote that Rice should have been crowned and was more deserving than Dao. Gunatilaka further praised Rice's "elegant" finale collection, found Dao's "sleek and sexy" collection "safe", and wrote about Dao's win that "corporate-speak beat out true creativity." Gunatilaka also criticized Vosovic's "serviceable but uninspiring" collection and was "glad Daniel didn't win."

In 2011, Vicky Hyman of The Star-Ledger criticized finale collections by "standout" finalists as "[m]ost underwhelming" of the first eight seasons to date and thought that eliminated Kara Janx's collection "would have stolen the show."
