= Titanmoon =

Indie rock band

- Origin: Dallas and Fort Worth, Texas, USA
- Genres: Indie rock
- Labels: Dizzy Culture Music
- Members: Tyler Casey; Zack Felton; Austin Alvis; Forrest Perry
- Past members: Nathan Schneidewent; Trey Ware
- Website: Official site

Titanmoon is a Dallas and Fort Worth-based indie rock band.

The group founded their own label, Dizzy Culture Music, Inc., in 2008, and released a full-length album, Film Black the same year. They performed two of their singles off this album, "Just a Shame," and "Morocco" on Good Morning, Texas, on March 11, 2008. They re-appeared on the program with two more songs, "Stay Close," also off of Film Black, and "Face the Clouds," a preview of their new album, on September 3, 2009. "Morocco" was featured on a pop music compilation album released by Nylo Hotels. In 2009 Titanmoon toured the world, stopping in Pakistan, United Arab Emirates, and Japan. These shows were dedicated to Daniel Pearl World Music Days. They video-blogged about some of this tour on their YouTube page.

After reading the book Three Cups of Tea by Greg Mortenson, lead singer Tyler Casey heard a Pakistani member of his church discuss a recent humanitarian trip to Karachi, Pakistan. Casey and his band members decided to go to Pakistan themselves, not only to perform but to encourage wealthy Pakistanis to help less-fortunate fellow Pakistanis. The group is now making plans to help found an orphanage and school in the Karachi area. Their tour and charitable mission was featured in the Summer 2010 issue of Dallas' La Mode Magazine.

While in Japan, the group acted as ambassadors of their hometown of Fort Worth to Fort Worth's sister city, Nagaoka, Niigata. They brought back with them a gift for Mayor Mike Moncrief from the Vice Mayor of Nagaoka.

In 2013, the band released the album Bang Bang, along with a film documenting the recording process entitled Churches, Salons and Bars. The group subsequently toured Europe. In 2015, they released the album Masquerade.

== Members ==
=== Current lineup ===
- Tyler Casey (lead vocals, guitar)
- Zack Felton (bass)
- Austin Alvis (lead guitar, vocals)
- Forrest Perry (drums)

=== Former members ===
- Nathan Schneidewent, founding member (lead guitar and vocals)
- Trey Ware (drums)

== Discography ==
- Postcard Republic EP (Independently Released, 2002)
- Film Black LP (Dizzy Culture Music, 2008)
- WE ALL SEE STARS LP (Dizzy Culture Music, 2010)
- Bang Bang LP (2013)
- Masquerade LP (2015)

== Filmography ==
- Churches, Salons and Bars (2013)
