= Daniel Vosovic =

American fashion designer (born 1981)

- Born: Daniel Vosovic Jr. March 25, 1981 (age 45); Grand Rapids, Michigan
- Education: Fashion Institute of Technology
- Occupation: fashion designer
- Television: Project Runway Season 2 (2nd)

Daniel Vosovic Jr. (born March 25, 1981) is an American fashion designer best known as the first runner-up in the second season of the American reality television series Project Runway.

== Early life and education ==
Daniel Vosovic Jr., born to his parents Daniel Vosovic Sr. and Sharon, had grown up in Lowell from age thirteen onward. There, he attended art-related classes of and graduated in 1999 from Lowell High School. Then he attended Grand Rapids Community College, including its courses on clothing construction and fashion design, and then graduated from the Fashion Institute of Technology (F.I.T.; New York City) in 2005. When he was an undergraduate, he competed at the Milano Studia la Moda (Milan). Also, he worked at the Woodland Mall location of Banana Republic for several years.

Vosovic is of Serbian and Slovak background. The father of his grandmother operated a tailoring company in Serbia. Vosovic also has a sister.

== Project Runway season 2 (2005–06) ==
=== Challenge wins ===
Daniel Vosovic Jr., a 24-year-old aspiring designer from Lowell, Michigan, first competed in the second season of the series. He won five challenges before the Fashion Week. As Lorilee Craker of The Grand Rapids Press noted, "Vosovic was not an obvious frontrunner" initially because "[h]e wasn't flamboyant enough" to garner more airtime in post-production results. Nevertheless, his challenge wins and "clean and savvy clothing creations" made him a viewers' "favorite to win" the season.

In the fourth episode, (Note: The first two episodes of the second series aired as the two-hour collaborated premiere on December 7, 2005.) where he made his first challenge win, Vosovic was the leader of his winning three-person team for the team lingerie challenge. In the challenge, a team must design three pieces under one "vision"; his team's "vision" was Lederhosen-based. His second challenge win occurred in the sixth episode: creating "a day-to-evening ensemble for Banana Republic." Required by the challenge, Vosovic partnered with Andrae Gonzalo, who shared Vosovic's second challenge win.

Vosovic's third challenge win occurred in the eighth episode: creating photos of whatever inspired a contestant and then selecting only one for a dress to base upon. He selected a photo of a Japanese orchid as his inspiration. He then won the fourth time a challenge where he was required to use "real plants and flowers", earning him an immunity from elimination. The judges heavily panned a design he made in the tenth challenge of the season, but he was automatically safe due to the immunity. (Note: Nick Verreos was eliminated in the tenth episode, placing him fifth.)

Vosovic's dress—"a gleaming navy gown [...] cut high up the thigh"—for the final pre-Fashion Week challenge in the eleventh episode—designing for the supermodel Iman—was criticized the series's judges, especially by Nina Garcia who deemed it "[s]afe and a bit boring". Nonetheless, he earned his fifth challenge win, securing him a finalist position. Before Vosovic became a finalist, the series's very first winner Jay McCarroll found all the four remaining contestants, including Vosovic himself, "kind of boring". (Note: This would include the fourth-place contestant Kara Janx. Nonetheless, Jay McCarroll enjoyed Santino Rice's "arrogant and funny" personality and somewhat "weird" works for being the only works of the season with "a clear point of view.")

=== Fashion Week finale ===
For the Fashion Week, Vosovic envisioned his thirteen-piece (Note: For the Fashion Week finale, the finalists—Vosovic, Chloe Dao, and Santino Rice—were assigned to construct twelve outfits for their own collections within five months after the second season's pre-finale taping on their own $8,000 budget. Later, they were assigned the final challenge of the season: with an assistance from an eliminated contestant of a finalist's choosing, build a thirteenth outfit to finish the collection within two days before the Fashion Week show on their own additional $250 budget.) collection including "earth tones using brown floral lace prints" and a "white swing coat with brass buttons". He named Oscar De La Renta and Narciso Rodriguez his inspirations due to their "calm and organized" runway shows. To further enhance his collection, he featured wooden-handled handbags.

For the more recently assigned thirteenth outfit—a "sleeveless shift dress in cream mohair"—to complete the collection, Vosovic chose an eliminated contestant Nick Verreos as his assistant. The judges complimented him but criticized his whole collection as "too safe" and for resembling neither Japanese culture nor military as intended. (Note: According to Vosovic, the ninety percent of the judges' feedback on Vosovic's collection were positive, but most of an hour of original judging scenes was edited out.) Vosovic became the first runner-up to the season's eventual winner Chloe Dao. (Note: Santino Rice became the second runner-up when Rice was eliminated first before Vosovic and Chloe Dao.)

Jen Chung of Gothamist noted how Vosovic's collection resembled the clothes sold at Banana Republic stores. Tenley Woodman of Boston Herald factored his inexperience for becoming a runner-up, despite mentor Tim Gunn's "constructive criticism". A Boston Globe critic found all three finalists' collections shown in the Fashion Week "disappointing" and further wrote that Vosovic's collection was "officewear [sic] meets a tassel."

Timothy Gunatilaka of Entertainment Weekly was "glad Daniel didn't win," noting Vosovic's "overconfiden[ce]", use of his age as an excuse when he "lost ground". Gunatilaka further criticized Vosovic's "serviceable but uninspiring" finale collection, whose most of pieces were "pedestrian" and incoherent but few others Gunatilaka praised.

== Post-Project Runway fashion design career ==
After the taping of Project Runway concluded, (Note: The Fashion Show, i.e. the finale, was filmed on February 10, 2006.) Vosovic established and then developed his own eponymous official website, uploading photos of his thirteen-piece collection before the Fashion Show finale aired. In the Project Runway season finale, after the Fashion Week results, judge Michael Kors offered Vosovic a job.

Vosovic designed uniforms for a then-newer chain Nylo Hotels. He created a twenty-outfit collection for the employees of Nylo: dresses for females; button-down dress or polo shirts underneath sophisticated blazers for males. The collection was also sold publicly in gift shops of Nylo's locations. For Nylo's gift shops, he also designed other accessories, like "luggage, handbags, Dopp kits for men, robes, [and] jewelry". He also designed sportswear for Nylo.

Vosovic further worked anonymously and low-profile for fashion companies. In 2012, he was accepted into the Fashion Incubator program, sponsored by the Council of Fashion Designers of America (CFDA), so he was able to improve his business skills. By 2014, he completed his two-year Fashion Incubator program.

== Fashion Inside Out book (2008) ==
Vosovic authored his photo book Fashion Inside Out, released on the week of October 26, 2008, and published by Watson-Guptill Publications, about his coverage on the fashion industry. The book also contains his interviews with Project Runway host Heidi Klum, fashion designers Diane Von Furstenberg and Todd Oldham, and other notable fashion figures. It also contains a foreword by Project Runway mentor and designer Tim Gunn.

Nina Garin of The San Diego Union-Tribune scored the "usefulness" of the book zero points out of ten, writing that it "does not help the average woman", despite "its pretty exterior". As Garin noted, the book is more of an autobiography about Vosovic himself and "a ridiculous vanity project" but well suited for Project Runway fans, "fashion students", and "Vosovic's parents."

== Project Runway All-Star Challenge (2009) ==
Vosovic re-competed on the two-hour Project Runway All-Star Challenge special, which aired on August 20, 2009, on Lifetime network, the same day when the sixth season of Project Runway premiered. (Note: The second runner-up Santino Rice from the second season also competed in the All-Star Challenge special.) He was given a $1,200-budget and designed first three pieces for the red carpet collection intended for the red carpet premiere of a then-upcoming 2009 film Nine starring Nicole Kidman, Penelope Cruz, Marion Cotillard, and Kate Hudson. Then, to complete it, the fourth one made from materials of a restaurant that the returnees dined in. Vosovic was crowned the winner, earning $100,000 for him to establish his clothing line.

Judith Neukam of the Threads magazine named Vosovic's collection her "least favorite" and thought that the collection resembled "exercise clothes" and was not as good as those that she praised by the remaining of the top four—Chris March (season four), Sweet P. Vaughn (season four), and Korto Momolu (season five). Neukan further deemed Vosovic's collection as something easy to pack for vacation and his fourth "restaurant" piece as resembling "Captain Blue with her hair spray jets." Ji Hyun Lee of Examiner.com found his collection "mediocre" and "a horrendous concoction of blue and white t-shirts and pants." (Note: Ji Hyun Lee of Examiner.com praised All-Star Challenge collections by returnees Uli Herzner (season three), who was one of the bottom four, and Chris March, who was placed fourth before the top three, whose collections Lee thought were "poor" and not as good as March's.)

Kelly Lynne questioned Vosovic's collection. Lynne found one of his dresses "hot" with "nice" shape and "creative" fabric selection but criticized his "bubble mini skirt and mesh tank top" and his "restaurant" design. (Note: Kelly Lynne (now Tinsley) also worked for The Ann Arbor News.) Despite favoring Vosovic in his original season, Missy Schwartz of Entertainment Weekly called Vosovic's "restaurant" design "a true horror" and seconded a reader's comment describing it as "a 'suicide bomber' dress". Schwartz also described Vosovic's "shiny black dress" as if "someone doused the sides with Wite-Out" and then used "push pins" to close up the sides.

Lynne and Schwartz believed that the first runner-up Korto Momolu instead should have won the All-Star Challenge special. (Note: Lynne topped Korto Momolu's All-Star Challenge collection above all others, including Vosovic's.) Schwartz further reported a poll shown on the Blogging Project Runway blog. Out of 2,029 users taking survey, eight percent thought Vosovic deserved to win, while fifty-six percent selected Momolu. On the contrary, Cynthia Boris of SheKnows.com considered Vosovic and Korto Momolu her "top two choices".

== Other post-Project Runway activities ==
External videos
- "Whatever You Like" by Anya Marina on YouTube

Vosovic portrays one of customers in the 2009 music video of Anya Marina's rendition of T.I.'s song "Whatever You Like". (Note: Actors Justin Kirk and Michael Stahl-David also portray the store customers in the music video. Anya Marina portrays the sex shop employee.) On March 13, 2010, he received his Visibility Award from the Philadelphia Regional Steering Committee of the Human Rights Campaign at the committee's 14th Annual Gala Dinner.

== Personal life ==
Vosovic is openly gay. As revealed in the series, he already came out to his family before Project Runway. By late October 2008, Vosovic shared a "five-bedroom, two-bathroom apartment" in New York City with his four old schoolmates from his high school—two males, two females—"a baker, a math teacher, a graphic designer and a shoe designer."

== Bibliography ==
- Vosovic, Daniel (2008). Fashion Inside Out: Daniel V's Guide to How Style Happens From Inspiration to Runway and Beyond. Photographs by Michael Turek. New York City: Crown Publishing Group. ISBN 978-0-8230-3217-4. LCCN 2008016862.

== Selected filmography ==
Year	Title	Medium	Role	Note
2005–06	Project Runway season 2	Television	Contestant	First runner-up
2009	Project Runway All-Star Challenge	Television	Contestant/returnee	Winner
2009	"Whatever You Like"	Music video	Customer	Rendition by Anya Marina
