= Under the Gunn =

- Also known as: Project Runway: Under the Gunn
- Genre: Reality competition
- Presented by: Tim Gunn
- Judges: Rachel Roy; Jen Rade; Zanna Roberts Rassi
- Country of origin: United States
- Original language: English
- No. of seasons: 1
- No. of episodes: 13

Production
- Executive producers: Barbara Schneeweiss; Bob Weinstein; David Hillman; Eli Lehrer; Harvey Weinstein; Jonathan Murray; Mary Donahue; Meryl Poster; Sara Rea; Teri Weidman; Tim Gunn
- Camera setup: Multiple
- Running time: 42 minutes
- Production companies: Sara Rea Productions; Bunim/Murray Productions; The Weinstein Company Television

Original release
- Network: Lifetime
- Release: January 16 – April 10, 2014

Related
- Project Runway

Under the Gunn (also known as Project Runway: Under the Gunn) is an American reality competition series that premiered January 16, 2014, on Lifetime. Production of the series began in November 2013, with the finale filmed on December 17, 2013. The series was filmed at the Fashion Institute of Design and Merchandising in Los Angeles. Guest judges included: Heidi Klum, Neil Patrick Harris, Macklemore, Jaimie Alexander, Zoey Deutch, Zendaya, Georgina Chapman, Sarah Hyland, Trina Turk, and Wendy Partridge.

== Synopsis ==
Hosted by Tim Gunn, Under the Gunn follows Project Runway alumni Mondo Guerra, Anya Ayoung-Chee, and Nick Verreos as they are handed the task of managing, coaching, and directing 15 designers. Designer Rachel Roy, celebrity stylist Jen Rade, and Marie Claire senior fashion editor Zanna Roberts Rassi serve as the judges. Within the first two episodes, Tim Gunn presents a challenge to the designers while Guerra, Chee, and Verreos analyze the skill level of the contestants and determine which four designers will be a part of their teams. In the following episodes, Gunn presents new challenges that test the mentors' ability to bring out the best in their designers as they guide them through the competition. Each team then competes in a series of challenges until one alumnus and one designer remains.

The winning contestant received a cash prize of $100,000, a sewing and embroidery studio from Brother Industries, an all-expense-paid trip to Paris, Blowpro styling products, a 2014 Lexus CT 200h, the opportunity to design a collection sold exclusively at francesca's, and a fashion spread in Marie Claire magazine plus a spot as guest editor for one year The winner also worked closely with Benefit Cosmetics creative team to design a new uniform for the Benefit Cosmetics field team members.

== Season 1 ==
| Season | Episodes | Originally released | | No. of Designers | Winner | Runner-up | Mentors | Prizes |
| Season | Episodes | First released | Last released | No. of Designers | Winner | Runner-up | Mentors | Prizes |
|---|---|---|---|---|---|---|---|---|
| 1 | 13 | January 16, 2014 | April 10, 2014 | 15 | Oscar Lopez (with Nick Verreos) | Sam Donovan (1st); Asha Daniels (2nd); Shan Keith Oliver (3rd) | Anya Ayoung-Chee; Mondo Guerra; Nick Verreos | Winner's Prizes: A $100,000 cash prize; A sewing and embroidery studio from Brother Industries; An all-expenses paid trip to Paris; A collection of Blowpro styling products; An opportunity to design the uniform for Benefit Cosmetics; A fashion spread in Marie Claire Magazine; A 2014 Lexus CT200; An exclusive collection for francesca's; Winning Mentor's Prizes: A 2014 Lexus CT200; A fashion spread in Marie Claire Magazine and a spot as a guest editor for one year |

== Designers ==
| Designer | Age^{1} | Hometown | Mentor | Finish |
|---|---|---|---|---|
| Melissa Grimes | 29 | Birmingham, AL | None^{2} | 15th/13th |
| Rey Ortiz | 32 | Añasco, PR | None^{2} | 15th/13th |
| Amy Sim | 53 | Portland, OR | None^{2} | 15th/13th |
| Camila Castillo | 47 | Caracas, Venezuela | Mondo | 12th |
| Brady Lange | 29 | Portland, OR | Anya | 11th |
| Isabelle Donola | 33 | New York, NY | Nick | 10th |
| Nicholas Komor | 26 | Atlanta, GA | Anya | 9th |
| Stephanie Ohnmacht | 37 | Denver, CO | Nick | 8th |
| Michelle Uberreste | 29 | Burbank, CA | Mondo | 7th |
| Natalia Fedner | 30 | West Hollywood, CA | Nick | 6th |
| Blake Smith | 25 | Hoboken, NJ | Anya | 5th |
| Shan Keith | 33 | St. Louis, MO | Anya | 4th |
| Asha Daniels | 25 | Cincinnati, OH | Mondo | 3rd |
| Sam Donovan | 23 | Boston, MA | Mondo | 2nd |
| Oscar Lopez | 40 | Coral Gables, FL | Nick | 1st |

^1: Age at the time of filming.

^2: The designer was not chosen by any of the mentors and eliminated simultaneously.

=== Models ===
- Meredith Hennesy
- Aryanne Padilha
- Ali Marie Stepka
- Janica de Guzman
- Bianca Palmerin
- Ana Kristina
- Ivana Korab
- Ashley Washington
- Aleksandra Rastovic
- Leslie Allen
- Tylynn Nguyen
- Elaine Fonseca
- Amanda Fields
- Milena Illina
- Taylor Reynolds
- Dani Vierra

== Designer Progress ==
| Designers | 1 | 2 | 3 | 4 | 5 | 6 | 7 | 8 | 9 | 10 | 11 | 12 | 13 | Eliminated |
|---|---|---|---|---|---|---|---|---|---|---|---|---|---|---|
| Oscar | IN | | IN | HIGH | LOW | WIN | HIGH | HIGH | WIN | WIN | HIGH | ADV | WINNER | 13 - Finale |
| Sam | | IN | WIN | IN | IN | IN | IN | WIN | IN | HIGH | LOW | ADV | RUNNER-UP | 13 - Finale |
| Asha | | IN | IN | HIGH | WIN | IN | IN | HIGH | LOW | LOW | HIGH | ADV | 3RD PLACE | 13 - Finale |
| Shan | IN | | HIGH | IN | HIGH | LOW | WIN | IN | HIGH | WIN | WIN | ADV | 4TH PLACE | 13 - Finale |
| Blake | IN | | HIGH | IN | LOW | LOW | LOW | IN | LOW | HIGH | OUT | | | 11 - The Benefit of Fashion |
| Natalia | LOW | | IN | IN | LOW | HIGH | HIGH | LOW | HIGH | OUT | | | | 10 - Crossing Teams |
| Michelle | IN | | LOW | WIN | IN | IN | IN | LOW | OUT | | | | | 9 - Trouble in the Lounge |
| Stephanie | | LOW | LOW | IN | LOW | HIGH | LOW | OUT | | | | | | 8 - It's an Unconventional Beach Party |
| Nicholas | | IN | IN | LOW | IN | LOW | OUT | | | | | | | 7 - Steampunk Chic |
| Isabelle | | IN | IN | LOW | OUT | | | | | | | | | 5 - Hit the Stage |
| Brady | IN | | IN | OUT | | | | | | | | | | 4 - Unconventional Vampire |
| Camila | IN | | OUT | | | | | | | | | | | 3 - Red Carpet Showdown |
| Amy | | OUT | | | | | | | | | | | | 2 - The Mentor Face Off |
| Rey | | OUT | | | | | | | | | | | | 2 - The Mentor Face Off |
| Melissa | OUT | | | | | | | | | | | | | 1 - Who Is Under the Gunn? |

The designer won Under the Gunn.
The designer won the challenge.
The designer came in second but did not win the challenge.
The designer had one of the highest scores for the challenge but did not win.
The designer had one of the lowest scores for the challenge but was not eliminated.
The designer was in the bottom two but was not eliminated.
The designer lost the challenge and was eliminated from the competition.
The designer advanced to the season finale.

Team Nick
Team Anya
Team Mondo

== Episodes ==
| No. | Title | Guest judge(s) | Winner | Eliminated | Original release date | U.S. viewers (millions) |
|---|---|---|---|---|---|---|
| 1 | "Who Is Under the Gunn?" | TBA | TBA | Melissa | January 16, 2014 | N/A |
In the premiere of the show, Tim Gunn introduces the three mentors to a group of 15 designers. He separates the designers into 2 groups- group one with 8 and the group two with 7. He announces that 3 designers will be eliminates, and that the second group will not be participating in the first challenge. The first group is led into the workroom and given a bag of 6 3-yard pieces of fabric that they have 6 hours to make an outfit that shows their design aesthetics. After the runway, the mentors take turns to pick out their team. Designers who are chosen by more than one mentor are given the opportunity to choose their mentor. Nick becomes disheartened when it appears that he is unpopular with the designers. First selection: Michelle Selecting Mentors: Mondo, Anya, Nick Selected Mentor: Mondo Second Selection: Shan Selecting Mentors: Anya, Nick Selected Mentor: Anya Third selection: Blake Selecting Mentors: Nick, Anya, Mondo Selected Mentor: Anya Fourth selection: Camila Selecting Mentors: Mondo, Nick Selected Mentor: Mondo Fifth Selection: Brady Selecting Mentors: Anya, Nick Selected Mentor: Anya Sixth Selection: Oscar Selection Mentor: Nick Selected Mentor: Nick (uncontested) This leaves Melissa and Natalia in the bottom two; the mentors bemoan the simplicity of Melissa's look, and raise doubts about Natalia's taste and time management. However, after a tearful appeal to the judges, both Nick and Mondo invite Natalia to be on their teams. Citing construction concerns, she ultimately chooses Nick, to his delight.
| 2 | "The Mentor Face Off" | TBA | TBA | Amy & Rey | January 23, 2014 | N/A |
The second group is given 30 seconds to pick out as much fabric as they want from drums scattered around the FIDM courtyard and given 6 hours to create a look that represents their aesthetic. Cognizant of the fact that there are fewer open positions for their group, several of the designers "up their game," creating a more competitive playing field for the mentors. First selection: Sam Selecting Mentors: Mondo, Anya, Nick Selected Mentor: Mondo Second Selection: Nicholas Selecting Mentors: Anya, Mondo, Nick Selected Mentor: Anya Third selection: Isabelle Selecting Mentors: Nick Selected Mentor: Nick (uncontested) Fourth selection: Asha Selecting Mentors: Mondo Selected Mentor: Mondo (uncontested) This leaves one spot on Nick's team open. Stephanie, Amy, and Rey plead their cases to Nick, but ultimately Nick states that his mind was already made up, and chooses Stephanie for his final mentee, leaving a disappointed Amy and a somewhat aggravated Rey to be eliminated.
| 3 | "Red Carpet Showdown" | TBA | Sam | Camila | January 30, 2014 | 1.54 |
Tim takes the designers and mentors for a bus tour around hollywood to inspire the designers to come up with a red carpet look, with Zanna Roberts Rassi citing that the winning look would be worn by a celebrity in a future publication of Marie Claire. As Tim analyzes the mentors, he finds himself stepping in to stop Nick from getting too hands-on with his designers. During the runway critique, Sam's outfit stands out for approaching red carpet clothing from a different direction and he is awarded the win; conversely, Camila is sent home for keeping her look too plain.
| 4 | "Unconventional Vampire" | Zoey Deutch & Trina Turk | Michelle | Brady | February 6, 2014 | 1.33 |
Sarah Hyland appears to promote the upcoming movie, Vampire Academy. She sets the designers with the task of making an outfit using vampire-related materials, which the designers have to run and collect from a in a graveyard-setting in the FIDM courtyard. Despite landing in the bottom two the previous week, Michelle is awarded the win over Asha for this challenge, while Anya is given the task of choosing between Brady and Nicholas as the losing designer. Ultimately, she decides that Nicholas has more potential, and sends Brady home.
| 5 | "Hit the Stage" | Zendaya | Asha | Isabelle | February 13, 2014 | 1.36 |
The designers must create a performance look for Zendaya to wear onstage while on tour. The designers seem to struggle with this challenge, and during the runway critique, seven designs are critiqued, with only Shan and Asha landing on top, while Nick's entire group (Stephanie, Oscar, Natalia, and Isabelle) and Blake end up on the bottom. Despite an overwhelming consensus from the judges that seems to point to Isabelle's elimination, Nick figuratively throws her under the bus after being unable to successfully help her manage her time, which causes concern amongst his remaining designers. Zendaya--tasked with choosing the winning designer--clearly heavily favors Asha's design, and awards her the win.
| 6 | "Pompeii Team Challenge" | Wendy Partridge | Oscar | None | February 20, 2014 | 1.34 |
The first team challenge requires the designers to create mini collections of 3 cohesive pieces, inspired by the Getty Villa and the movie, Pompeii. Nick's team has a shaky start, and seems unable to reach common ground. Oscar takes over the group in order to turn things around, and Nick's group ultimately ends up winning the challenge, with Oscar being cited as the clear winner in his group. Mondo's team is safe, while Anya's team is declared the losing team. Blake's outfit is praised by the judges, which leaves Shan and Nicholas up for elimination. Ultimately neither designer is eliminated due to their "potential."
| 7 | "Steampunk Chic" | Georgina Chapman | Shan | Nicholas | February 27, 2014 | 1.29 |
The designers are challenged to make avant-garde outfits inspired by steampunk, utilizing unconventional materials found at Travel Town Museum in Griffith Park, Los Angeles. Tensions run high between Anya and Nicholas because of his consecutive bad performances, whereas Shan has upped his game after his near elimination. Shan wins the challenge, and Anya is yet again given the task between sending Blake or Nicholas home. Apparently learning from her mistake the first time, she chooses Blake to stay.
| 8 | "It's an Unconventional Beach Party" | Georgina Chapman | Sam | Stephanie | March 6, 2014 | 1.38 |
The designers enjoy a beach party in the California sun and then are challenged to use the materials from the seaside bash to create their looks. Frustrated with being safe since his initial win, Sam seems to struggle with his look, whereas Oscar has difficulty settling on a design for the challenge. Tim criticizes him for relying too much on the mentor critique to drive his design choices. After the runway, Mondo is given the responsibility of awarding the win to either Sam or Asha, ultimately choosing Sam for overcoming his frustrations with the challenge, and sticking to his design aesthetic. Sam is also awarded a bonus prize for creating the look that best matched the mood of the California beach party challenge. Even though Michelle is harshly criticized for making a cocktail waitress outfit and not utilizing enough unconventional materials, it's Stephanie who is sent home for yet again failing to deliver a compelling runway look.
| 9 | "Trouble in the Lounge" | Macklemore | Oscar | Michelle | March 13, 2014 | 1.50 |
The designers are required to create day-to-night transition outfits for the runway, inspired by Glade 2-in-1s. Oscar wins the challenge, and Michelle is sent home. Mondo and Anya have problems with Natalia, and confront the judges about their decisions.
| 10 | "Crossing Teams" | Sei Jin Alt | Oscar and Shan | Natalia | March 20, 2014 | 1.47 |
The designers are placed in pairs across mentor groups to create a 3 look mini collection to be manufactured and sold at Francesca's. Shan and Oscar, Blake and Sam, and Natalia and Asha are paired up for this challenge. Asha is noticeably unhappy about the proposition of working with the unpredictable Natalia, and the two butt heads when Natalia seems to be wasting time. The mentors collaborate on their critiques, with Nick and Mondo seemingly disagreeing over the direction of the Asha/Natalia pairing. Several of the designers provide interviews saying that Natalia is faking her incessant emotional outbursts. Oscar, Shan, Sam, and Blake are in contention for the win, with both Shan and Oscar being chosen as the winner. Asha and Natalia both give tearful speeches after being asked which of them should be sent home, and though neither of them actually give a clear answer, Natalia insinuates that she wouldn't want Asha to feel as though she was being sent home for something Natalia did. Ultimately, Natalia is eliminated for her poor construction.
| 11 | "The Benefit of Fashion" | Annie Ford Danielson | Shan | Blake | March 27, 2014 | 1.47 |
The designers are paired with clients who have specific fashion needs, and are tasked with giving them makeovers. Oscar: Dani has to shop in the children's sections of stores due to her petite stature, and is in need of a more age appropriate wardrobe. Shan: Brittany is a single mom looking for exciting date look to break up the monotony of her day wear. Blake: Ruzena is looking to have her tomboyish image more feminized. Sam: Norah is looking for something that she can wear from the office to the bar. Asha: Erin is looking for a birthday outfit that celebrate her recent 50lb weight loss. All of the designers seemingly struggle in this challenge--Asha frets that the judges will send her home for the most minor issue after the previous week, while Sam is criticized for his poor fabric choices. Shan's client has an allergic reaction to sequins, and he has to make a dress for her in the two hours before the runway show. On the runway, Oscar is criticized for making Dani look old, whereas Sam and Blake both struggle to give their clients interesting designs. Asha is praised for making Erin glow with happiness, while Shan is credited with his think quick design, and is awarded the win and a bonus prize for his resourcefulness.
| 12 | "Superhero Fashion" | Jamie Alexander | TBA | TBA | April 3, 2014 | 1.44 |
The designers are tasked with creating looks inspired by the attributes of Marvel Superheroes. Sam becomes emotional after he connects Hawkeye's story to his struggles as a young gay teen, and shares that his mother accidentally prevented him from committing suicide, which he had never told her. Despite this emotional breakthrough, he and Asha are put up for elimination, both of whom seem sad to be losing their best friend right before the finale. However, in a twist, both designers from Mondo's team are put through to the finale, to the distaste of the other designers and mentors.
| 13 | "Finale" | Heidi Klum & Neil Patrick Harris | Oscar | Sam, Asha & Shan | April 10, 2014 | 1.46 |
The designers must create their collections in three days. The winning designer and mentor are chosen. Sam's Collection: Inspired by the armor people build up to protect themselves, and how his armor crumbled during the competition. Asha's Collection: Inspired by "Coming to America" and the idea of Queen Nefertiti in Harlem. Oscar's Collection: Inspiration unclear; seems to be inspired by Cuba and women giving life. Recycles past designs. Shan's Collection: Inspired by the dichotomy of hard and soft, using leather and lace. In the workroom, Nick is surprised at how directional Sam's collection is turning out, while Sam declares Asha his biggest competition. During critique, Mondo challenges both Asha and Sam to make their designs less costumey. Shan struggles to come up with a cohesive statement, and Oscar is reprimanded for repeating past looks. On the runway, Sam is lauded for his ability to create a cohesive, salable collection out of highly disparate fabric choices but criticized for not creating more of a show. Asha is told her collection is "next level" by the sitting judges, who appreciate her growth in the competition; however Neil and Heidi find it to be too costumey. Oscar is praised by the guest judges for a gorgeously made collection, but the main judges are disappointed at how many of his looks are disappointing remakes. The judges' disappointment in Shan's collection is palpable, with Jen Rade looking nearly in tears. The judges debate the criteria of who should win the challenge, and Tim has to reiterate the nature of the challenge itself. Shan is left out of the conversation while Asha, Oscar, and Sam are thrown around as potential winners. Ultimately, the decision comes down to Oscar and Sam, and the former is declared the winner of Under the Gunn.
