= Diana Eng =

American fashion designer

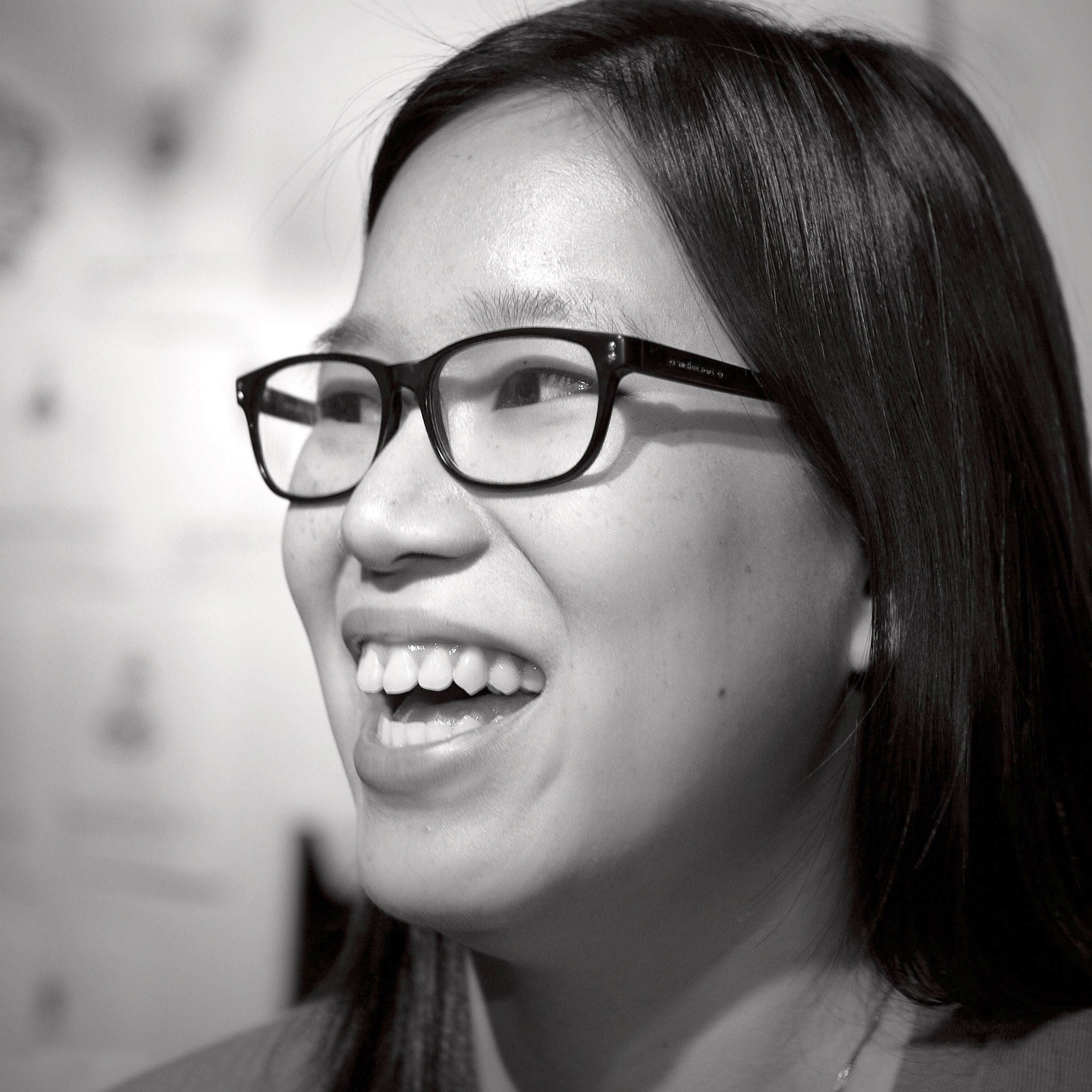
- Eng in 2009
- Born: Jacksonville, Florida
- Education: Rhode Island School of Design
- Occupation: fashion designer
- Television: Project Runway Season 2 (9th)

Diana Eng (born in Jacksonville, Florida) is a Chinese-American fashion designer, author and fashion technologist based in New York. She is best known as a contestant on the second season of the reality television program Project Runway. Eng is a co-founder of an art/electronic group called NYC Resistor, and authored a book called Fashion Geek.

== Early life ==
She attended Stanton College Preparatory School and later the Rhode Island School of Design (RISD). She graduated with a BFA from RISD in Apparel Design in 2005. In 2005, prior to graduation she participated in Seamless: Computational Couture, a fashion show hosted by Massachusetts Institute of Technology (MIT) with fellow RISD grad Emily Albinski, together they designed a dress that with the push of a button would inflate into a ball gown shape. Shortly after the Seamless: Computational Couture show, she appeared on Project Runway.

== Project Runway ==
During the second season of the reality television program Project Runway, in the fifth episode, in which designers had to create a party dress for Nicky Hilton, contestant Daniel Vosovic referred to her as "Dirty Diana" because of the way she danced at the party.

Eng was eliminated in the sixth episode, during the Banana Republic challenge, along with fellow contestant Marla Duran.

In the finale, Chloe Dao picked Diana to help with the final challenge of designing an additional garment. Chloe was selected as the winner of Project Runway Season 2.

Eng's work has been featured on the cover of i-D magazine and in The Boston Globe. Eng held a major fashion show after the success of Project Runway and had model Diana Georgie as the opening catwalker.

== Work ==
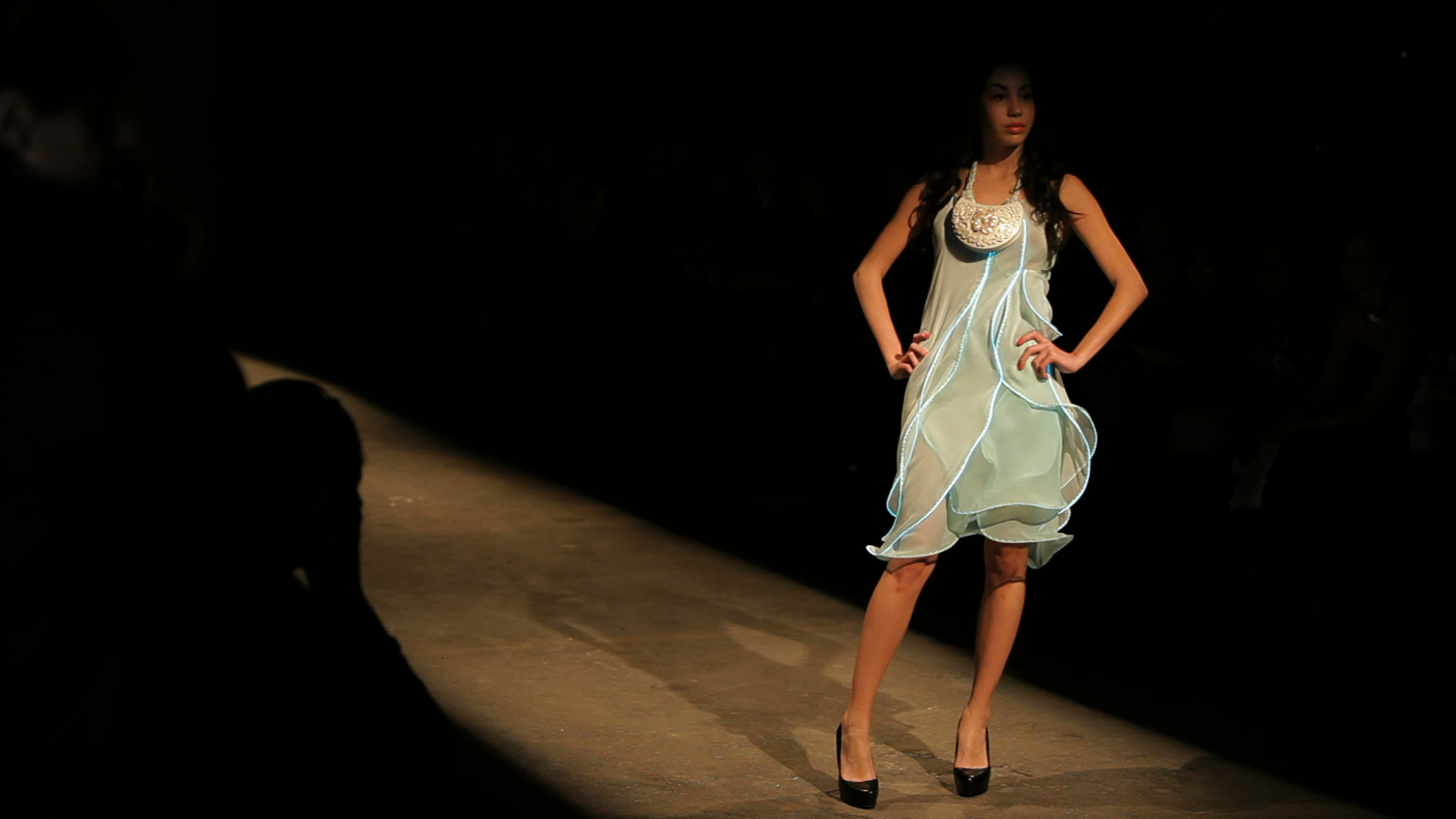
One of Diana Eng's Fairytale Fashion Collection designs

Diana, who helped popularize the term "Fashion Nerd," earned top honors at Yahoo!'s 2006 "Hack Day".

The winning project, called Blogging In Motion, combined a camera, a handbag, a pedometer and the Flickr API to create a device that takes a picture after every few steps and then automatically blogs those pictures. The device was created by Diana Eng, Emily Albinski and Audrey Roy, pictured to the right along with the device.

— Michael Arrington

Eng authored a book in 2009, Fashion Geek: Clothes Accessories Tech is a DIY book that teaches how to make electronic fashions published by North Light Books.

Diana Eng holds an Amateur Radio license with the call-sign KC2UHB and has made instructional ham-radio videos. In March 2010, she joined the ARRL Public Relations committee.

In February 2010, she held a one-woman fashion show at Eyebeam entitled "The Fairytale Fashion Collection" featuring garments with EL wire, LEDs and various sensors.

In 2013, she was featured in CNN's The Next List where she demonstrated her use of integrated conductive thread that enables a dress to light up without any traditional wiring. In this episode, Diana Eng was filmed shopping for inspiration at CJS Sales in the garment Center of NYC

Eng is a contributor to the magazines Make and Craft.

== See also ==
- Chinese Americans in New York City
