= Rita Verreos =

Venezuelan TV personality, actress, and model

- Born: July 19, 1968 (age 58); Caracas, Venezuela
- Occupation: Television host
- Television: Survivor: Fiji; HSN; FOX; Telemundo; Jewelry Television
- Children: Two

Rita Rosina Verreos (born July 19, 1968) is a Venezuelan actress, model, television host and beauty pageant titleholder. She is most well-known for her participation in Miss Venezuela 1988 and for her appearance on the reality television show Survivor: Fiji.

== Personal life ==
A native of Venezuela, Verreos moved to San Francisco with her family when she was eight years old. Her father is of Greek descent, while her mother is of Panamanian descent. She attended UC Berkeley before graduating cum laude from the University of California, Los Angeles with a bachelor's degree in Italian and French Literature. She is a member of the Golden Key National Honor Society. After graduating from UCLA, she got married and moved to Mexico City to live with her husband and children for eleven years before moving to San Antonio in 2003. She and her husband divorced in 2004.

She currently lives in Miami, Florida. She married actor and producer Carl Mergenthaler on June 8, 2014. Her brother is Project Runway designer Nick Verreos.

== Pageants ==
Verreos was a contestant in the Miss Venezuela 1988 pageant while representing Municipio Vargas, and competed in the 1988 "Reinado Mundial de Banano" pageant in Machala, Ecuador, placing 1st Runner Up to Ximena Correa of Ecuador. Verreos has also judged many pageants, including Miss Oklahoma USA, Miss Kansas USA, Miss Hawaiian Tropic San Antonio, Miss, Teen & Mrs. International. She has also coached many pageants including Miss Texas, Miss CaliforniaTamiko Nash and actress Meagan Tandy and Miss USA Winner & actress Crystle Stewart and Miss USA 1st Runner Up Nana Meriwether.

== Television appearances ==
Verreos competed in San Antonio magazine Conexión's 2005 "Hottest Latina" contest, placing as second runner-up, and in the CMT reality television program The Ultimate Coyote Ugly Search.

Rita was recruited by Survivor casting director Lynne Spillman at a beauty pageant, and became a contestant on Survivor: Fiji, the 14th season of the series. Her strategy was to draw on her sex appeal to win the show's million dollar prize. She lost 15 pounds during filming, and suffered broken cartilage in her nose. Verreos was the sixth castaway to leave the island.

Verreos was a contestant on the May 29, 2009, episode of The Price is Right. Verreos' television debut was in 2003 as a TV spokesperson for H-E-B, a Texas-based supermarket chain which aired weekly on the Kens 5 CBS morning talk show, "Great Day SA."

Verreos has also hosted En Nuestro Hogar on Telemundo and Azteca America in San Antonio (June 2007), was the Fill-In Morning News Traffic Anchor for the Kens 5 CBS (2008), served as a guest host on HSN (2009–2010) and as a "beauty tips expert" on Fox Utilisima's' Hola Martin (2011), and acted as a fill-in anchor for KVDA Telemundo. She appeared as the TV spokesperson in the World Car TV commercials (Univision, Telemundo, 2008–2014) and infomercials on WOAI (San Antonio). She has appeared in national television commercials for Safelink cellular phones and Bedoyecta Vitamins. She created, produced and hosted the web show Latin Connection (2008–2014), and from 2017 to 2018, she appeared in roles in the Telemundo series Sangre de mi tierra (2017), Al otro lado del muro (2018), and Mi familia perfecta (2018). In 2019, she became one of the few News Anchors presenting and producing newscasts for both Spanish language (Telemundo KXTQ and KASA) and English language (FOX34) networks. Currently, she is the first and only TV Show Host on Jewelry Television presenting shows in English and Spanish.

== Other ==
Verreos is a former professional ballerina, and has modeled in Venezuela, Mexico, and Los Angeles, for designers such as Oscar de la Renta and Victor Alfaro. She also appeared in the 1990 film Marked for Death. Rita was the "In Arena" Host at the AT & T Center for the Spurs Organization female basketball team the Silver Stars during the 2010 season. In 2008, she was awarded the "Outstanding Achievement in Entertainment" Award by La Prensa Newspaper. In 2010, Rita won the "Dancing with the Lonestars" Ballroom dancing competition to raise funds for a local charity in San Antonio, TX. In 2011, Rita received the President's Call to Service Award for Lifetime Achievement in Volunteerism for her decade of philanthropic work.
