= Kara Janx =

South African fashion designer (born 1975)

- Born: Kara Jankelowitz; 17 September 1975 (age 50); Johannesburg, South Africa
- Education: degree in architecture
- Occupation: Fashion designer
- Television: Project Runway Season 2 (4th)

Kara Janx (born 17 September 1975) is a South African fashion designer best known for her participation as a contestant on the second season of Bravo's Project Runway, which aired from December 2005 to March 2006.

== Early life ==
Born Kara Jankelowitz, in Johannesburg to an Ashkenazi Jewish family.

== Career ==
Janx moved to New York City after obtaining a degree in architecture. She then became a fashion designer and launched her first collection in 2002. In 2009 Janx won the title of International Sportswear Designer of the Year, and then in 2011 she launched a successful bridal-wear line. On 14 January 2007, Janx married Sharone Sohayegh (sometimes referred to as Red) in South Africa. Sharone is involved in real estate. Kara gave birth to her first child, a 6 lb. 14 oz daughter named Dylan on 12 November 2007. She gave birth to her second child, a boy named Calum, in 2009.

== Project Runway ==
On Project Runway, Janx lasted eleven episodes before being eliminated. She was, however, in the bottom two in the eighth episode, the Inspiration challenge, and in the bottom three during the seventh episode, the On Thin Ice challenge. She was one of the last four contestants remaining and just missed a spot in the final three at New York City's Olympus Fashion Week. Janx did get to show her collection at Fashion Week as a decoy so that viewers would not know who was actually in the final three until her last episode aired later that week.

Janx appeared on the first season of Project Runway All-Stars. She was eliminated in the seventh episode.

== After Project Runway ==
Since Project Runway, Janx has designed for her own eponymous label. She worked as design director at Elie Tahari, and in 2015 debuted a new line, Tenby.

As a designer, Janx is especially well known for her kimono wrap dresses, one of which she wore on her original season of Project Runway.
