= Nylo Hotels =

American hotel chain

NYLO Hotels
- Company type: Private
- Industry: Hospitality industry
- Founded: 2004
- Headquarters: United States
- Number of locations: Five
- Key people: Michael Mueller: co-founder, president, CEO; Stephane Dupoux: co-founder, creative direction
- Products: Boutique hotels
- Brands: NYLO; XP Collection by NYLO; SODA Bar; Terrace Bistro; LOFT Bar and Restaurant; LOCL Bar and Restaurant
- Website: www.hilton.com

NYLO Hotels LLC was an American boutique hotel chain. The company was founded in 2004 and was headquartered just outside Dallas in Carrollton, Texas. NYLO Hotels included five urban boutique hotel locations throughout the United States. Each hotel was unique in its design and featured food from local businesses, event venues, along with various room sizes that were fashioned to resemble New York loft style apartments.

== Company history ==
NYLO Hotels was founded in 2004 by a team of hotel executives led by Stephane Dupoux and Michael Mueller. Co-founder Michael Mueller served as CEO since 2011. Previously, Mueller was an executive with Starwood Capital Group and Starwood. Mueller oversaw the acquisition of Westin Hotels and Sheraton Hotels and Resorts and also helped engineer the W Hotels brand while he was with Starwood from 1994 until 2004 when he co-founded NYLO Hotels. Co-founder Stephane Dupoux, founder and CEO of Dupoux Design, led the creative team responsible for the identity, branding, architectural and interior design.

NYLO stood for New York lofts in which the company modeled its hotels after. When the company first began operating after its founding, it was headquartered in Atlanta, Georgia. At the end of 2007, NYLO opened its pioneering hotel in Plano, Texas, later followed by two more hotels in the Dallas/Ft. Worth area. NYLO also has hotels in Rhode Island and New York City. The company remained based out of Atlanta until 2011 when it relocated to the Dallas area.

== Features ==
The NYLO Hotel brand featured urban styled guestrooms which combined old buildings with modern design. The brand name, NYLO referred to the loft style apartments found throughout New York, but the company is focused on introducing designer hotels to secondary and tertiary markets. The company aimed its attention to providing designer style to mid-scale priced hotels that were business-travel-friendly.

NYLO Hotels was also focused on eco-friendly and energy-efficient operations. In 2012, the NYLO Dallas South Side location became one of 69 hotels in the United States to achieve LEED Gold certification. Other NYLO locations utilize eco-friendly initiatives such as wind power, recycled building materials, and energy-efficient light bulbs.

== Hotels ==
- NYLO Plano at Legacy, located in Plano, Texas, was the first NYLO Hotel location and the first loft lifestyle hotel to open in the United States. The hotel has 176 guest lofts with approximately half of the hotel's energy needs comes from wind power.
- NYLO Providence/Warwick, located just outside Providence, Rhode Island, was originally opened in 2008, but closed for over 12 months of renovations following the historic flood of 2010. The hotel reopened in 2011 and features 163 rooms and overlooks the Pawtuxet River.
- NYLO Las Colinas/Irving, located in Irving, Texas, was the third NYLO Hotel with 200 guest lofts. The hotel also features a 7,500 square-foot courtyard with two heated pools and is a 100 percent energy renewable certificate recipient.
- NYLO Dallas South Side located in Dallas, Texas, was the smallest location with 76 rooms. The five-story building included a rooftop bar and pool called SODA Bar which was an acronym for South Dallas.
- NYLO New York City opened in 2013 and was the largest NYLO Hotel with 291 rooms. The NYC location also featured a piano lounge, library, sidewalk cafe, and main bar.

== After NYLO ==
- The Dallas hotel became Canvas Hotel Dallas as of January 2019.
- The NYLO locations in Plano, Irving, and Providence-Warwick were renamed as part of Hilton's Tapestry Collection brand, by January 2019.
- The New York NYLO, by January 2019, has become Arthouse Hotel New York City.

The NYLO Hotels website redirects to the former Plano hotel's Tapestry Collection website, as of January 2019.
