= Nick Verreos =

American fashion designer

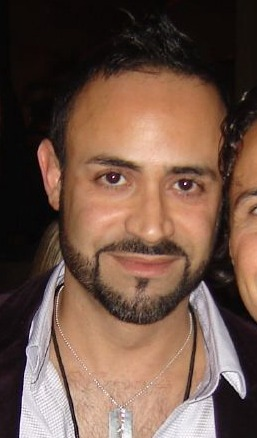
- Verreos in 2006
- Born: February 13, 1967 (age 59); St. Louis, Missouri
- Education: UCLA; Fashion Institute of Design & Merchandising
- Labels: NIKOLAKI, NV Nick Verreos
- Awards: Winner, Suisse du Jeune Talent Competition
- Website: Nick Verreos's Personal Blog

Nick Verreos (born February 13, 1967, in St. Louis, Missouri) is an American fashion designer, fashion commentator, former Project Runway contestant, educator and author.

== Early life and education ==
Verreos was born in Missouri on February 13, 1967, to a Greek-American father and a Panamanian mother. Though born in St. Louis, Missouri, he spent his early childhood in Caracas, Venezuela. Verreos and his family moved back to the United States when he was 10, and he finished elementary and high school in San Francisco, California. He began college at UCLA, studying Political Science and International Relations, but after graduation, turned his interest to fashion design and pursued additional work at the Fashion Institute of Design and Merchandising (FIDM) in Los Angeles. He completed the Advanced Fashion Design Program at FIDM in 1993.

== Fashion lines ==
After graduating from FIDM, Verreos worked for a variety of companies in Los Angeles before launching his own high-end label, NIKOLAKI, with partner David Paul in 2001.

NIKOLAKI dresses and red carpet gowns designed by Verreos and Paul have been worn by a number of notable celebrities, including actress/singers Beyoncé, Katy Perry, and Carrie Underwood, Project Runway host/supermodel Heidi Klum, Academy Award-winning actress Marlee Matlin (who wore a NIKOLAKI gown to the 80th Annual Academy Awards in 2008), Desperate Housewives cast members Eva Longoria and Brenda Strong, actress/comedian Kathy Griffin, Dancing with the Stars co-host Samantha Harris and judge Carrie Ann Inaba, and former Miss USA and TV Guide Network Fashion Wrap host Ali Landry.

In 2013, Verreos launched a second label, NV Nick Verreos. The collections in this line are created with the philosophy that every woman deserves a red carpet moment. While initially available exclusively through EVINE in the United States, NV Nick Verreos is now also available through QVC (UK), QVC (Italy) and The Shopping Channel in Canada.

== Fashion expert / educator ==
Verreos began teaching at FIDM in 2003 and has been associated with the school ever since. As of September 2016, he continues to serve as a FIDM instructor and spokesperson. Lauren Conrad was one of Verreos's students at FIDM, and he appeared briefly on her series The Hills.

After his Project Runway appearances (see below), Verreos began to appear on screen as a "red carpet" fashion commentator. In February 2008, he hosted three fashion segments on E! Countdown to the Academy Awards, and covered the red carpet arrivals on SOAPnet.com for the Daytime Emmy Awards in June 2008 and Primetime Emmy Awards in September 2008. Verreos was also one of the regular panel members on TV Guide Network's Fashion Wrap, which covered the Oscars, Grammys, Golden Globes, Emmy Awards and Screen Actors Guild Awards in 2012 and 2013.

In January 2008, Verreos appeared on an episode of the CW show Crowned: The Mother of All Pageants to help the mothers and daughters with their pageant gowns and choose which team had the best outfits.

In 2009 (four years after winning the My Scene Barbie Challenge on Project Runway), Verreos mentored a group of FIDM students as they, and he, at Mattel's request, created one-of-a-kind designs for the FIDM Barbie 50th Anniversary Collection.

In 2011, Verreos participated in a mock-reality TV-themed advertising campaign for Virgin Mobile, portraying a stylist to a fictional celebrity couple: SPARAH.

Verreos has also launched Fashion School with Nick Verreos on YouTube. The channel is an online Fashion 101, and features short lessons on subjects like Fabric 101, Sequins 101, Fundamentals of Fashion Forms, Straight Grain vs. Cross Grain, etc.

In August 2016, Verreos published a fashion text entitled A Passion for Fashion: Achieving Your Fashion Dreams One Thread at a Time. The book was written with partner David Paul, and Project Runway mentor and New York Times bestselling author Tim Gunn wrote the foreword. The Los Angeles book launch and signing were held on August 23, 2016, and covered by KTLA's Gayle Anderson. The New York book launch and signing were held on September 9, 2016, in the Barnes & Noble at FIT. As the title suggests, the text is meant for anyone, young or old, who is interested in pursuing a career in the fashion industry.

In August 2018, Verreos and partner David Paul were named Co-Chairs of the FIDM Fashion Design Program.

== Project Runway franchise ==
In June 2005, Verreos participated in the second season of Project Runway, a reality television program in which fashion designers compete against each other for a design mentorship with Banana Republic, seed money to start their own line, and other prizes. Verreos finished in fifth place in the competition. He won the "All Dolled Up" challenge in the third episode in which designers had to design a dress for the My Scene Barbie collection. The doll was later marketed in limited release to the public and quickly sold out in stores. He was judged one of the top three designers during the "Social Scene" challenge in the fifth episode. However, he ranked among the bottom two or three in three additional challenges: "Window Shopping" (episode six), "Flower Power" (episode nine), and "Makeover" (episode ten). He was eliminated after the Makeover Challenge in which he was charged with designing a fashion makeover for fellow contestant Daniel Vosovic when he failed to add pockets to the pants, a move the judges thought made his fellow contestant appear too feminine. Season 2 of Project Runway aired on Bravo from December 2005 through March 2006.

In the Winter of 2007, Verreos was a guest mentor on Project Runway Canada where the designers had to create two resort wear outfits.

He appeared in an April 2008 episode of the Karma Air show Fashion 411 with Barbra Horowitz to share some of the behind the scenes experiences on Project Runway, as well as the events and projects with which he was then involved.

After being a contestant in Season 2, Verreos appeared as an audition judge, guest judge and guest commentator on various seasons of Project Runway and its various spin-offs.

In 2013, Verreos and fellow Project Runway alums Mondo Guerra and Anya Ayoung-Chee were invited to serve as mentors for the pilot season of Project Runway: Under the Gunn. Hosted by Tim Gunn, Under the Gunn followed the mentors as they were handed the task of managing, coaching, and directing 15 competing designers. At the end of a very competitive season, judges Heidi Klum and Neil Patrick Harris declared designer Oscar Garcia-Lopez and Verreos, his mentor, to be the season winners.

After being a contestant in Season 2, Verreos appeared as an audition judge, guest judge and guest commentator on various seasons of Project Runway and its various spin-offs.

In September 2016, Verreos began his 13th season of blogging on Lifetime's official Project Runway website.

From 2019 to 2021, after Project Runway returned to Bravo, Verreos served as a consulting producer on the show.

== LGBTQ advocacy ==
Verreos has made a personal commitment to supporting LGBTQ civil rights, and supports non-profit organizations such as The Human Rights Campaign, The Trevor Project and GLAAD.

Verreos's public contributions to the LGBTQ cause include a number of personal appearances. He emceed a fundraising event for GenderPAC in 2008. In February 2009, he participated in The Trevor Project's Oscar Night celebration, which raised more than $11,000 for the organization. In Spring 2009, Verreos was invited to be photographed in one of the early photo shoots for Adam Bouska and Jeff Parshley's NOH8 Campaign, and can be seen in the "behind the scenes" video. In Fall 2009, he and swimwear from his Nikolaki collection made an appearance on the catwalk at the EQCA Equality Awards gala.

== Personal life and family ==
Verreos and partner David Paul live in the Los Angeles area with their dog Benny.

Verreos's father was a U.S. State Department diplomat in Panama, and met Verreos's mother there. His mother's great uncle, Arnulfo Arias, served as the president of Panama on three occasions (1940–41, 1949–51, and ten days in October 1968).

Verreos's sister Rita Verreos appeared in Survivor: Fiji, which aired in Spring 2007.

For the 2008 holiday season, Verreos, along with LL Cool J, Vanessa Hudgens and Ty Pennington (among others), participated in the Sears "Grant A Wish" campaign. Each celebrity was asked to share a personal "American Wishtory" about a gift that helped them become who they are today. Verreos described how his mother's gift of a sewing machine inspired him to think beyond fashion illustration, and to think about what it would be like to design and create fashion.

== Publications ==
- Verreos, Nick; Paul, David; Gunn, Tim (2016), A Passion for Fashion: Achieving Your Fashion Dreams One Thread at a Time, Simon & Schuster: A Post Hill Press Book, ISBN 978-1-68261-010-7
