= Delaware County Daily Times =

American newspaper, founded 1876

- Type: Daily newspaper
- Format: Tabloid
- Owner: Digital First Media
- Publisher: Ed Condra
- Editor: Joe Hart
- Founded: 1876
- Headquarters: 639 South Chester Road, Swarthmore, Pennsylvania, United States
- Circulation: 40,291 daily 35,653 Sunday (as of 2009)
- Website: delcotimes.com

The Delaware County Daily Times is a daily newspaper founded 1876. It is the only major newspaper in Pennsylvania to be branded with a county name rather than a city.

The newspaper began as the Chester Daily Times in 1876. Its current name was adopted in 1959 and its offices left the economically declining City of Chester, Pennsylvania for Primos, an unincorporated postal designation in Upper Darby Township. According to the Journal Register Company, it has the largest circulation of any suburban paper in the Philadelphia area. The Sunday edition is known as the Delaware County Sunday Times.

The Delaware County Sunday Times is currently owned by Digital First Media, a subsidiary of Alden Global Capital.

== History ==
The first edition of the paper, then known as the Chester Times, was a four-page broadsheet printed on September 7, 1876, selling for one cent. Pictures began to appear in the paper by 1915. In November 1959, the Chester Times changed its name to the Delaware County Daily Times.

On June 15, 1981, the paper transformed from a broadsheet to a tabloid and made the switch from an afternoon paper to a morning edition. Previously a six-day paper, the Delaware County Daily Times began to print Saturday editions on October 25, 1997.

== Notable former reporters ==
- Orrin C. Evans, pioneering African-American journalist
- F. Gilman Spencer Sr., 1974 Pulitzer Prize winner in editorial writing.
- William Cameron Sproul, former Pennsylvania governor and 1920 Republican presidential candidate.
- Joby Warrick, 1996 Pulitzer Prize winner for public service in journalism.

== Selected editors ==
- Phil Heron (to 2020)
- Joseph Hart (2020–2022)
