= Jewels! The Glitter of the Russian Court =

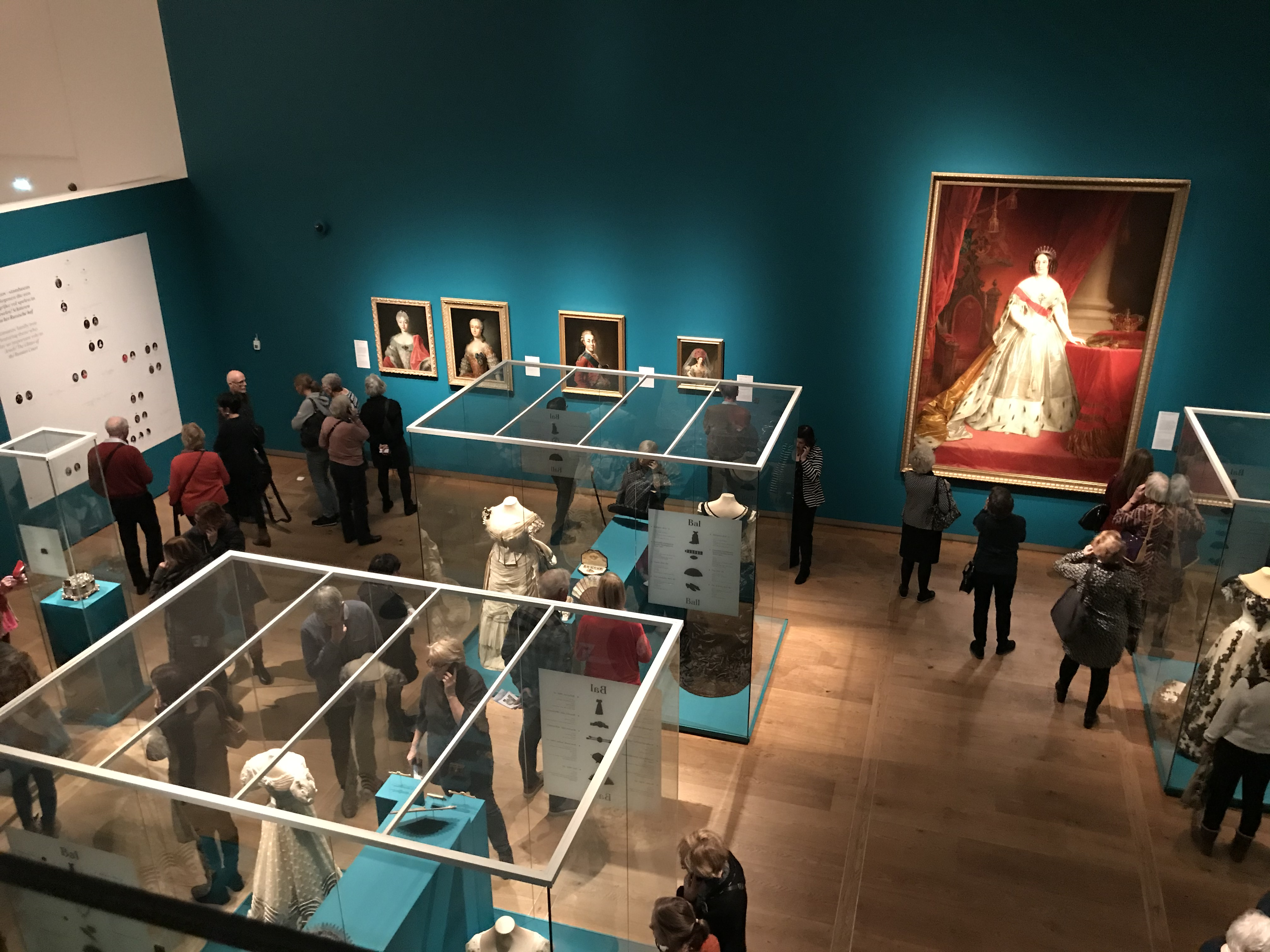
Overview of the "Ballroom" display with the Romanov family tree as a mural on the left tracing the relationship to the Dutch Queen Anna Paulowna, whose large portrait as Russian Grand Princess in 1849 can be seen on the right. Three of her personal bracelets were on loan to the exhibition from the Dutch Royal collection.

Jewels! The Glitter of the Russian Court (Dutch: Juwelen! Schitteren aan het Russische Hof) was the second jubileum exhibition in Amsterdam by the Amsterdam Hermitage (since 2022 called the H'ART Museum), focussed on the personal taste for luxury by Russian nobility. The show, which was planned to run from 14 September 2019 to 15 March 2020, suffered from the pandemic and was extended twice, ending finally 16 October 2020.

The main theme of the exhibition, jewelry, was loosely grouped into categories: personal jewelry for balls, show jewelry for treasury displays of the nobility, jewelry for children, men, weddings, mourning dress and finally, the end of an era, or fin-de siècle. Each category was shown in context of other clothing, accessories and furniture through paintings. The time periods ranged roughly from 1700-1900. The entrance to the exhibition began with two formal jackets for court balls, one for a chamberlain, and one for a princess with a long train. Besides a few specifically named loan items, everything on show was from the Hermitage collections in St. Petersburg.

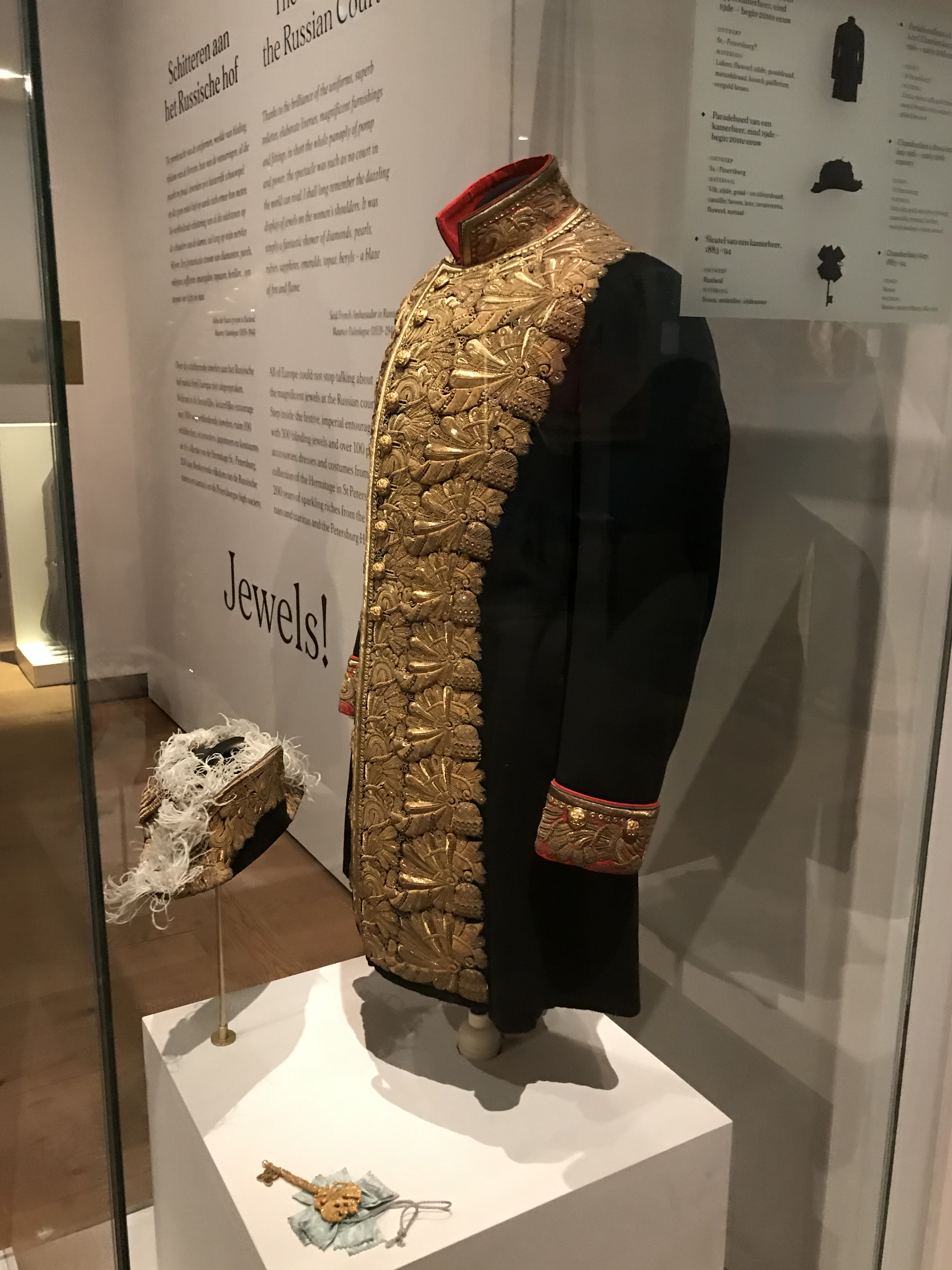
Chamberlain's jacket, hat, and key

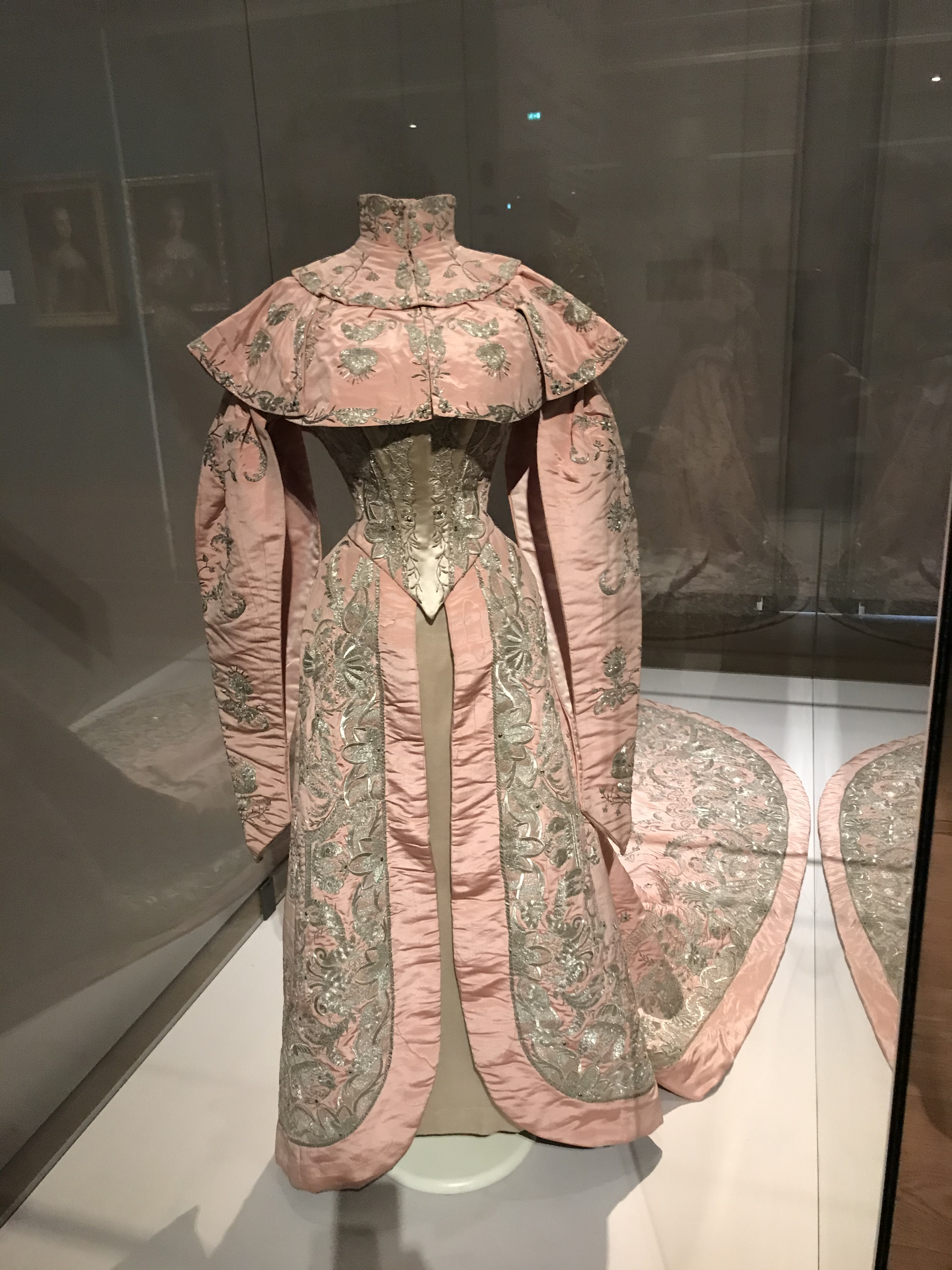
Ceremonial Court Dress worn by Princess Zinaida Yusupova

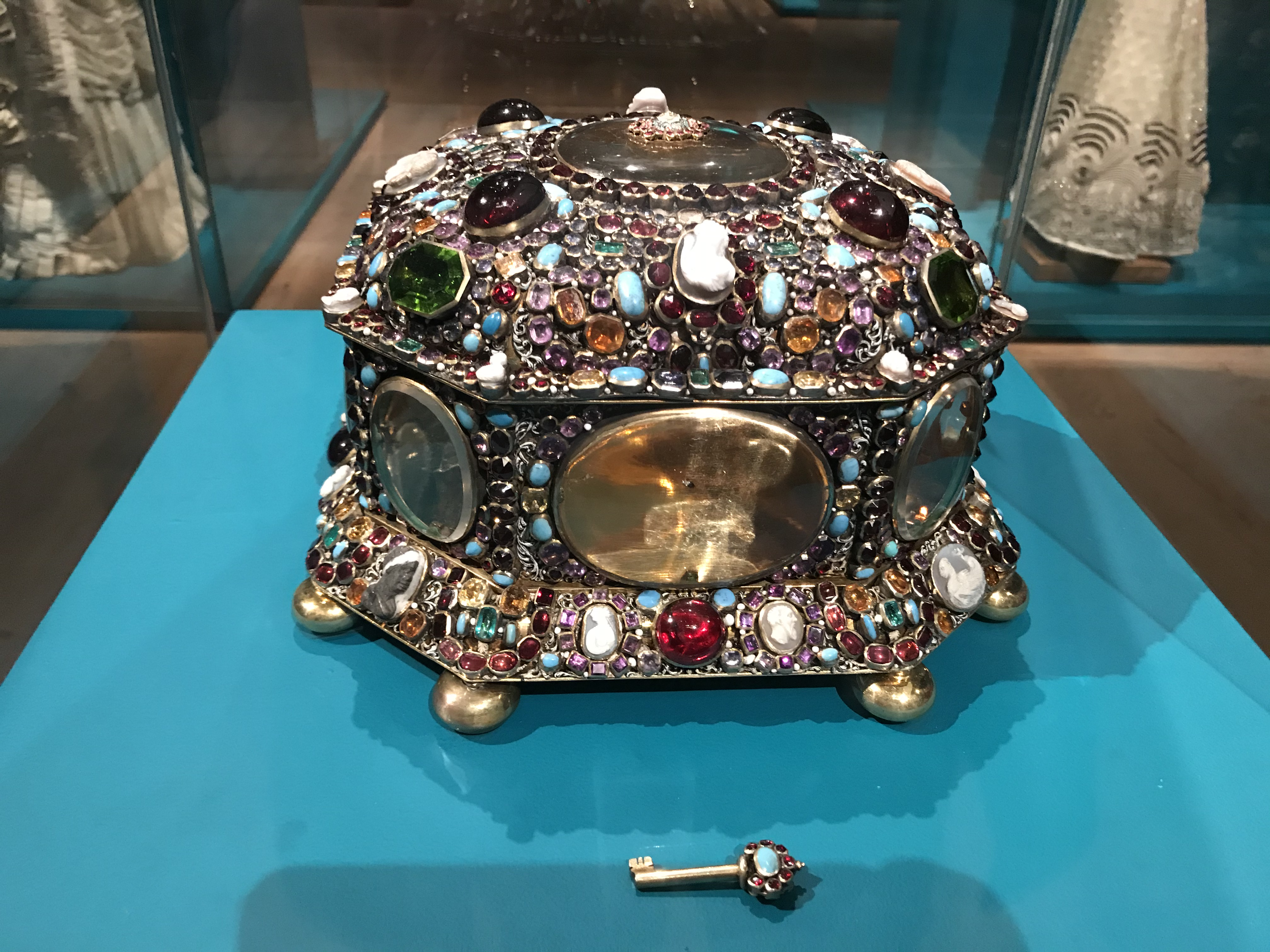
Behind the entrance was a recently restored jewelry box from circa 1690

== Ballroom ==
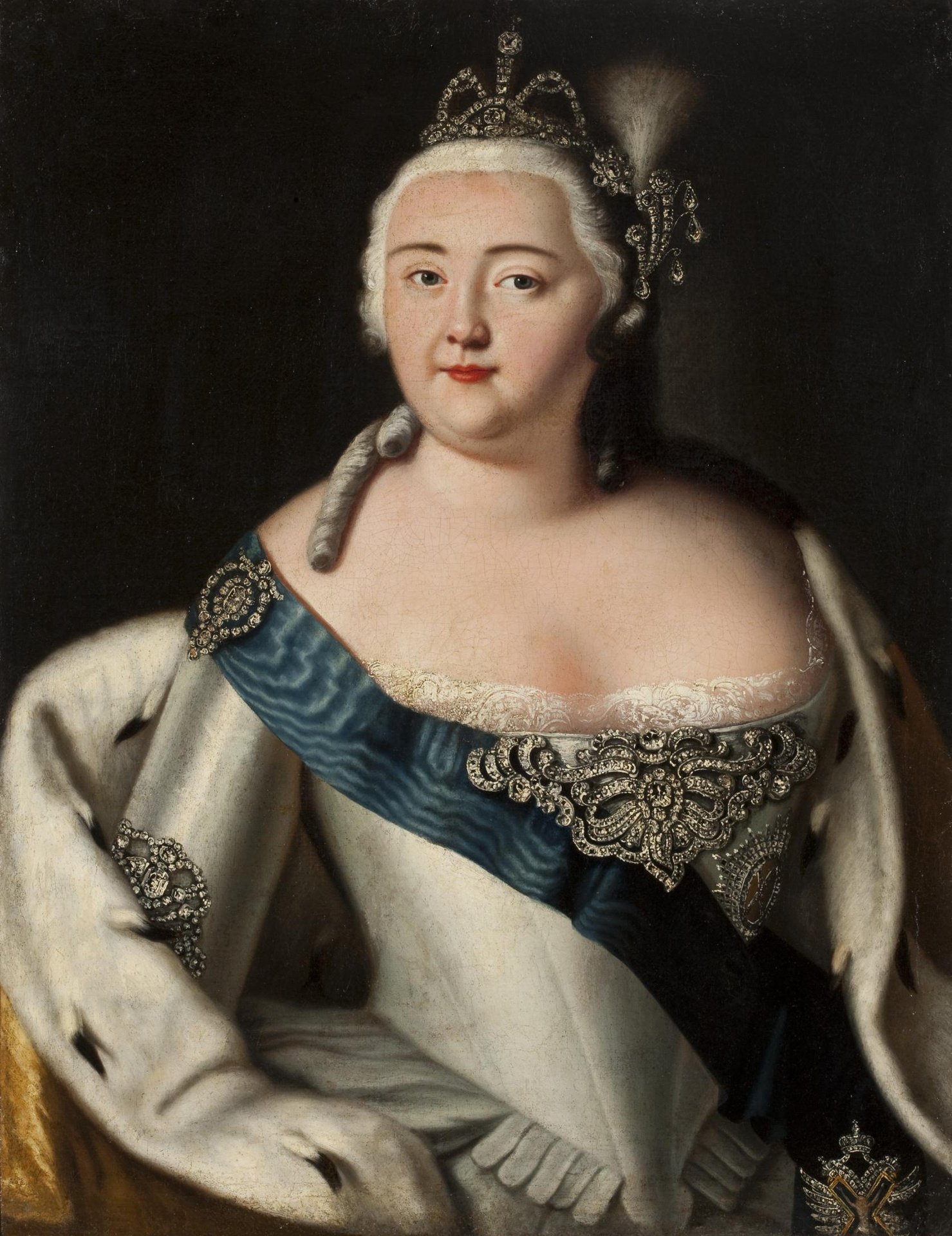
Portrait of Empress Elizabeth Petrovna (1709-1761)

In the central ballroom, a helpful Romanov family tree showed miniature versions of the portraits on display. Viewing the clothing of the rulers in their portraits helps to put their jewelry in context. They are portrayed wearing their ermine-lined mantles with lots of prominent jewelry, and some portraits show pieces which can be traced from one generation to the next. They are seen wearing a star or badge of the order of St Andrew.

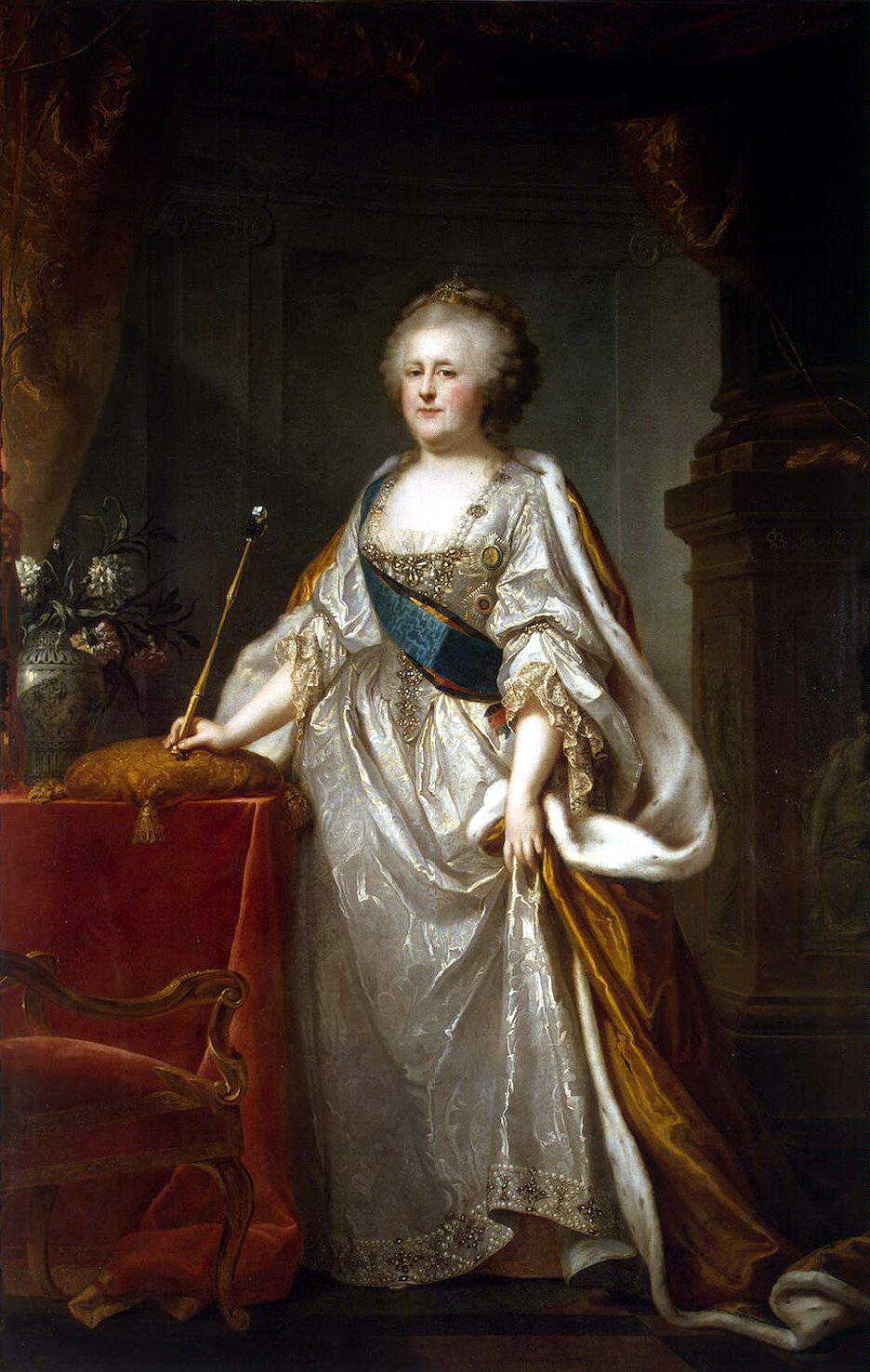
Catherine II lifts her hem to show it's lined with pearls

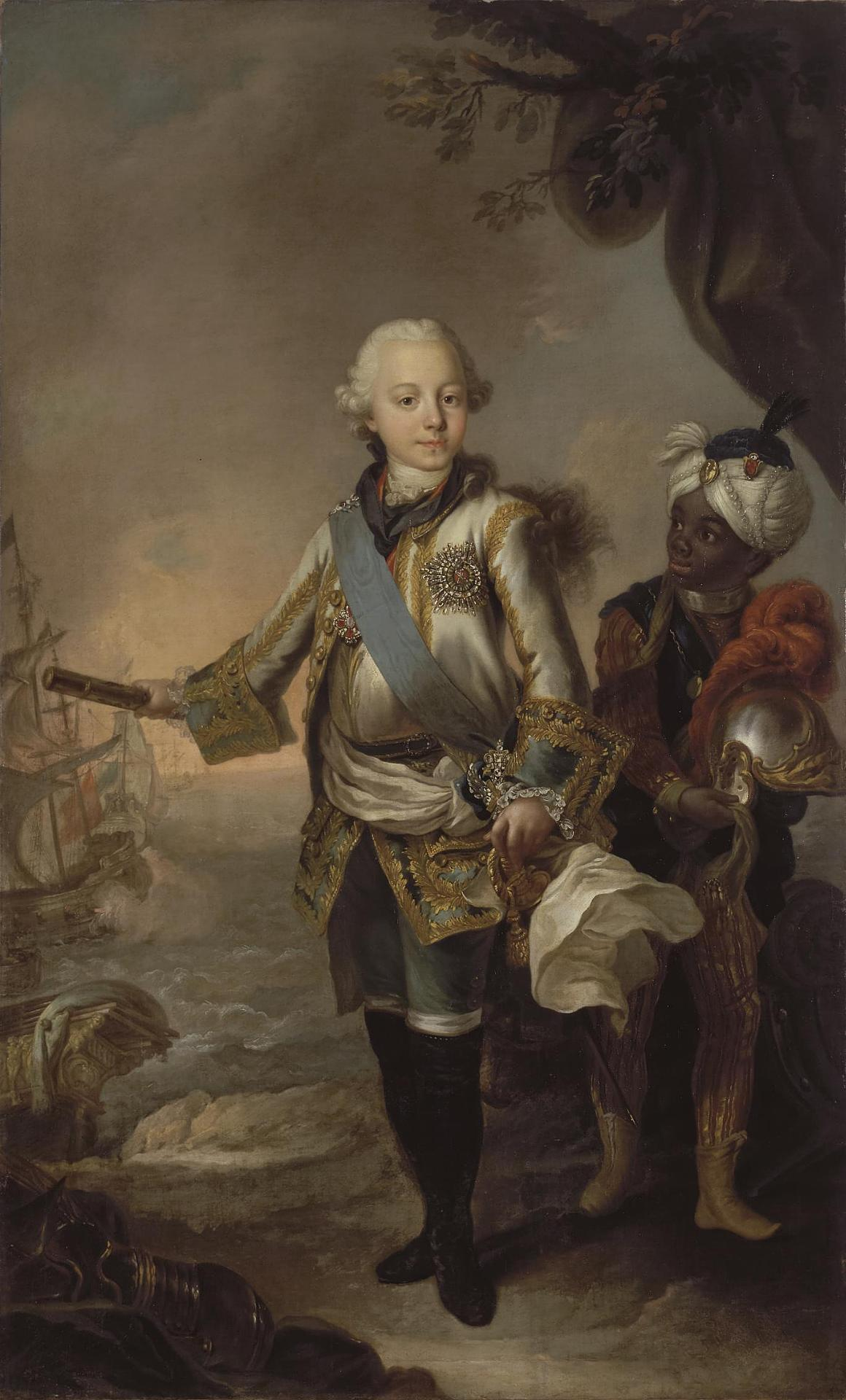
The later Paul I of Russia wearing a diamond-studded star of the order of St. Andrew, shown with an enslaved page and a ship

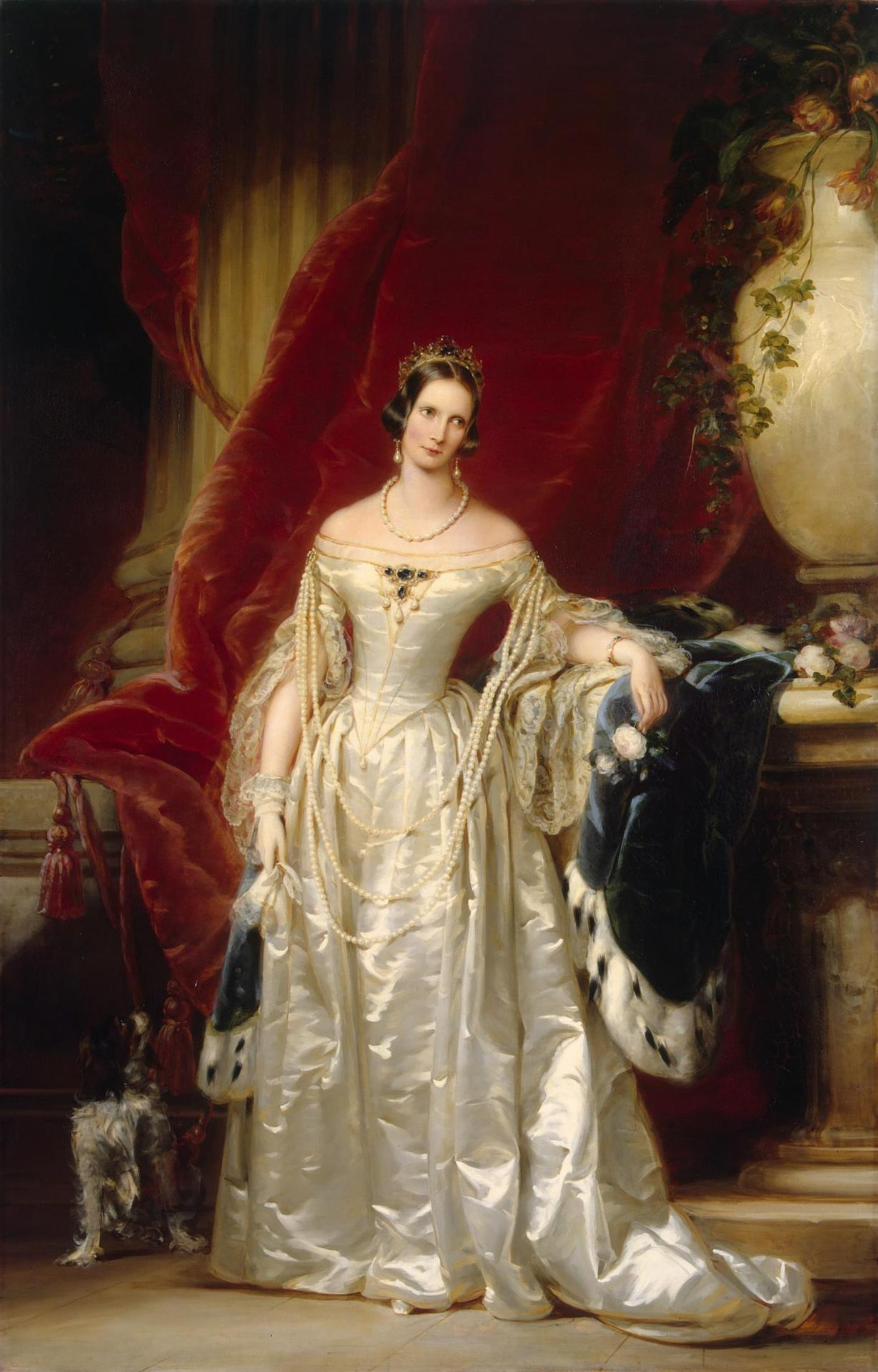
Empress Alexandra Fedorovna wearing long chains of pearls

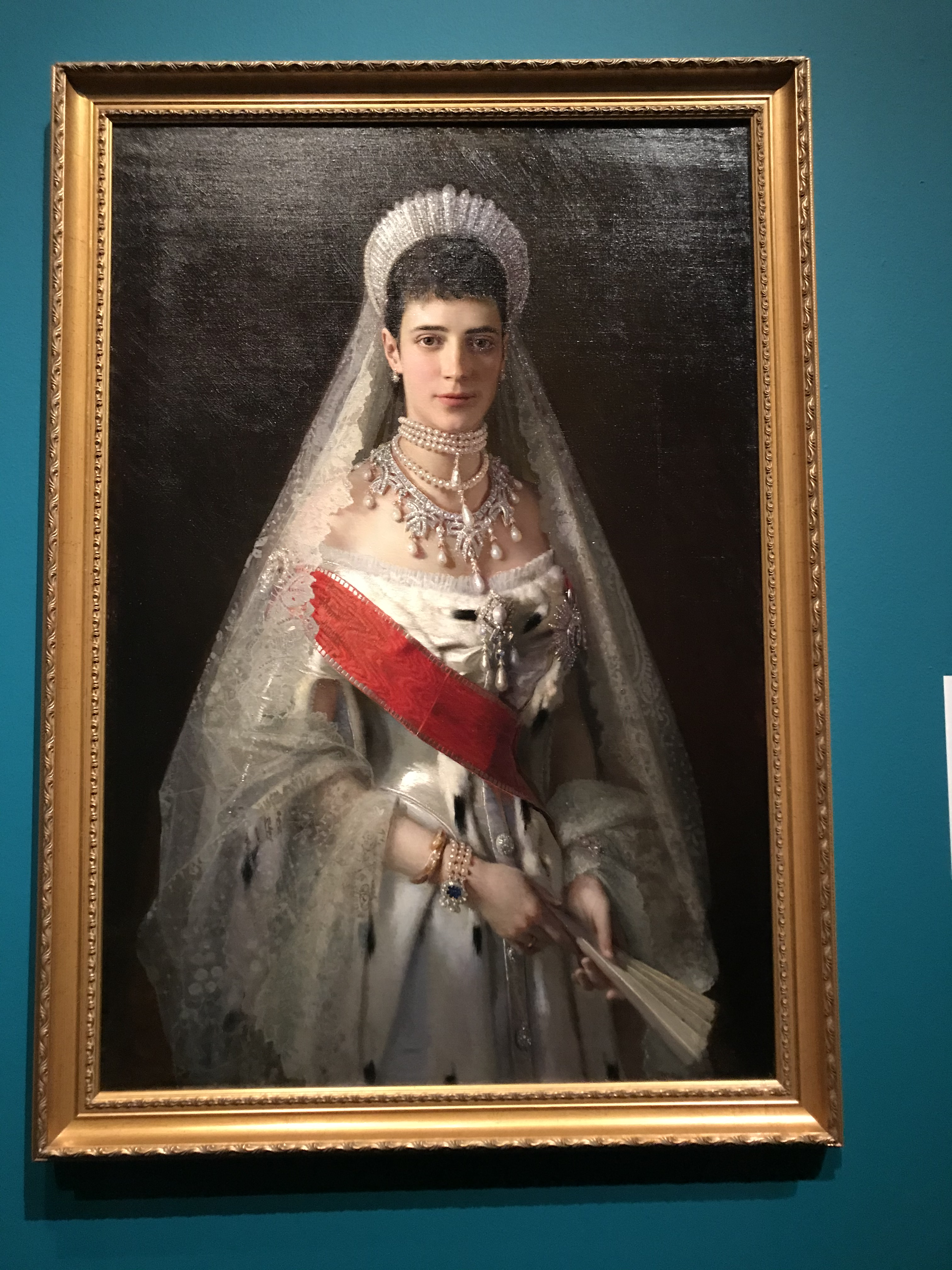
Portrait of Empress Maria Feodorovna, wearing a kokoshnik tiara of diamonds and large pearl necklaces

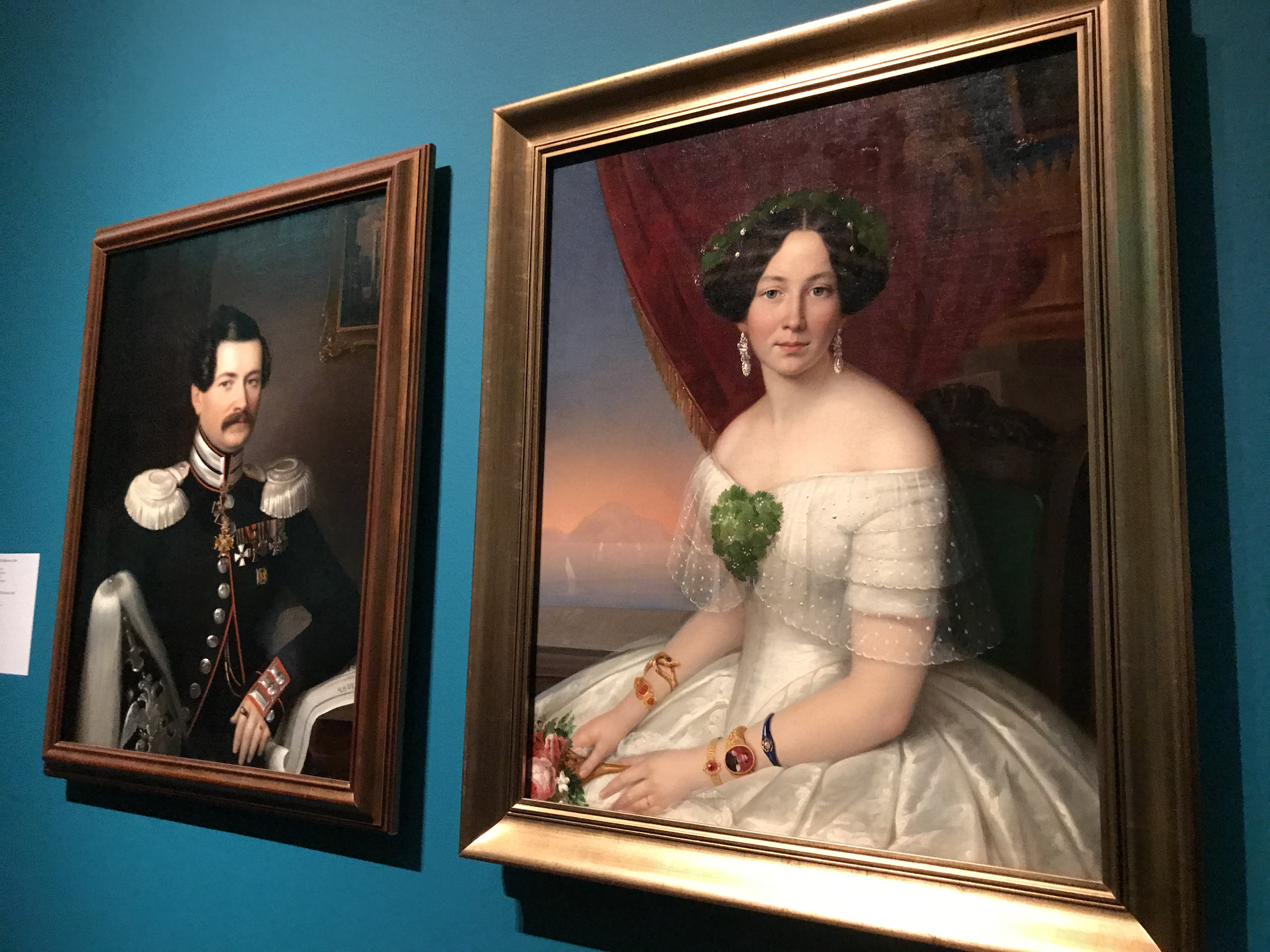
Pendant portraits, 1848

Non-royal portraits also lined the walls. These were court ball attendees wearing the style of nearby clothing and accessories on display. For example, the portraits of Arkady Telyakovsky and his wife Julia Kanshina show how the clothing and accessories were worn in the mid-19th century. Arkady is wearing a dress uniform with silver buttons and silver epaulets. On his chest can be seen several military honors. Julia carries a porte-bouquet and wears several bracelets at once, and one of them has a miniature portrait of her husband.

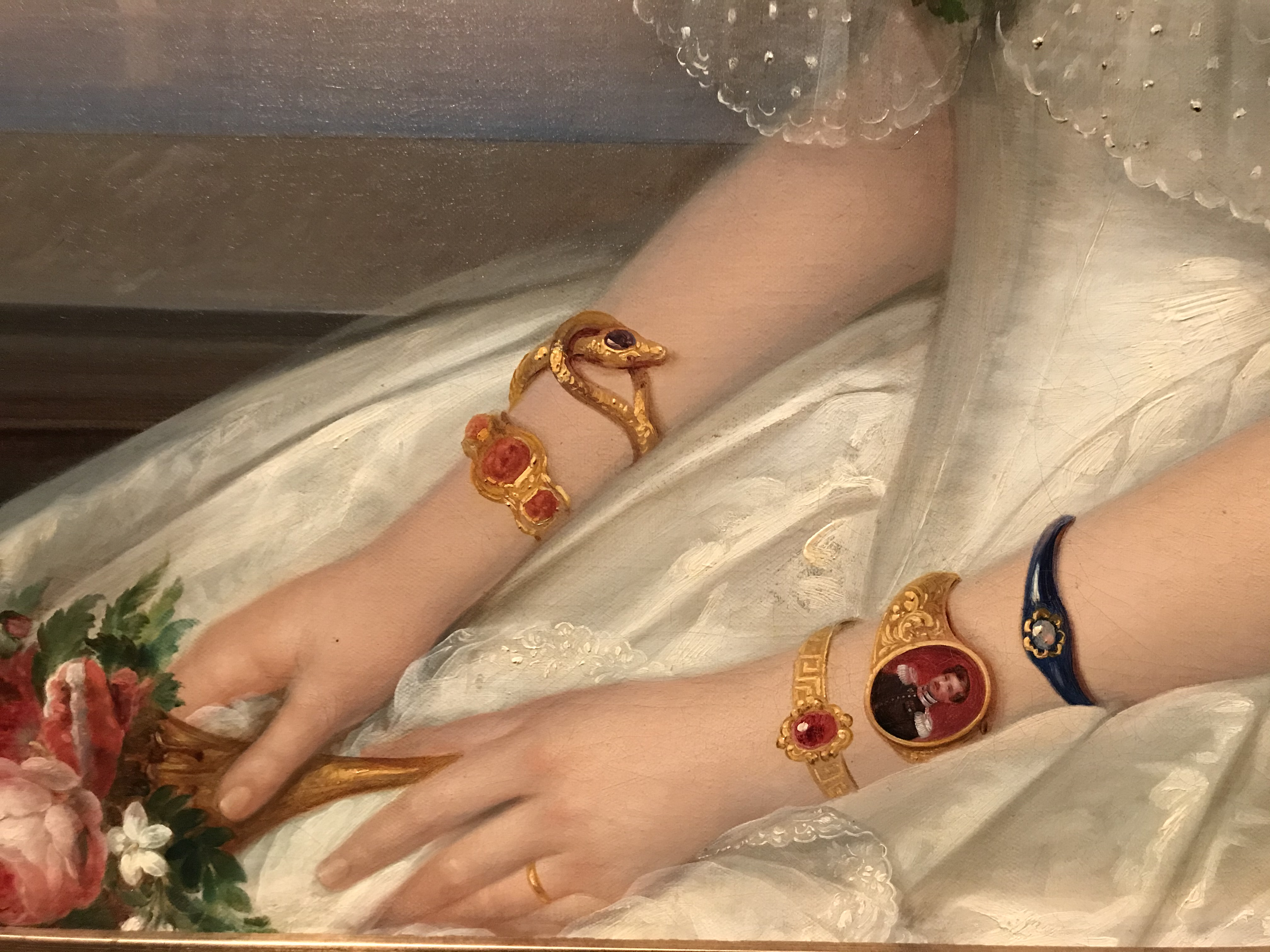
Julia Kanshina's hands with similar artefacts as those on show

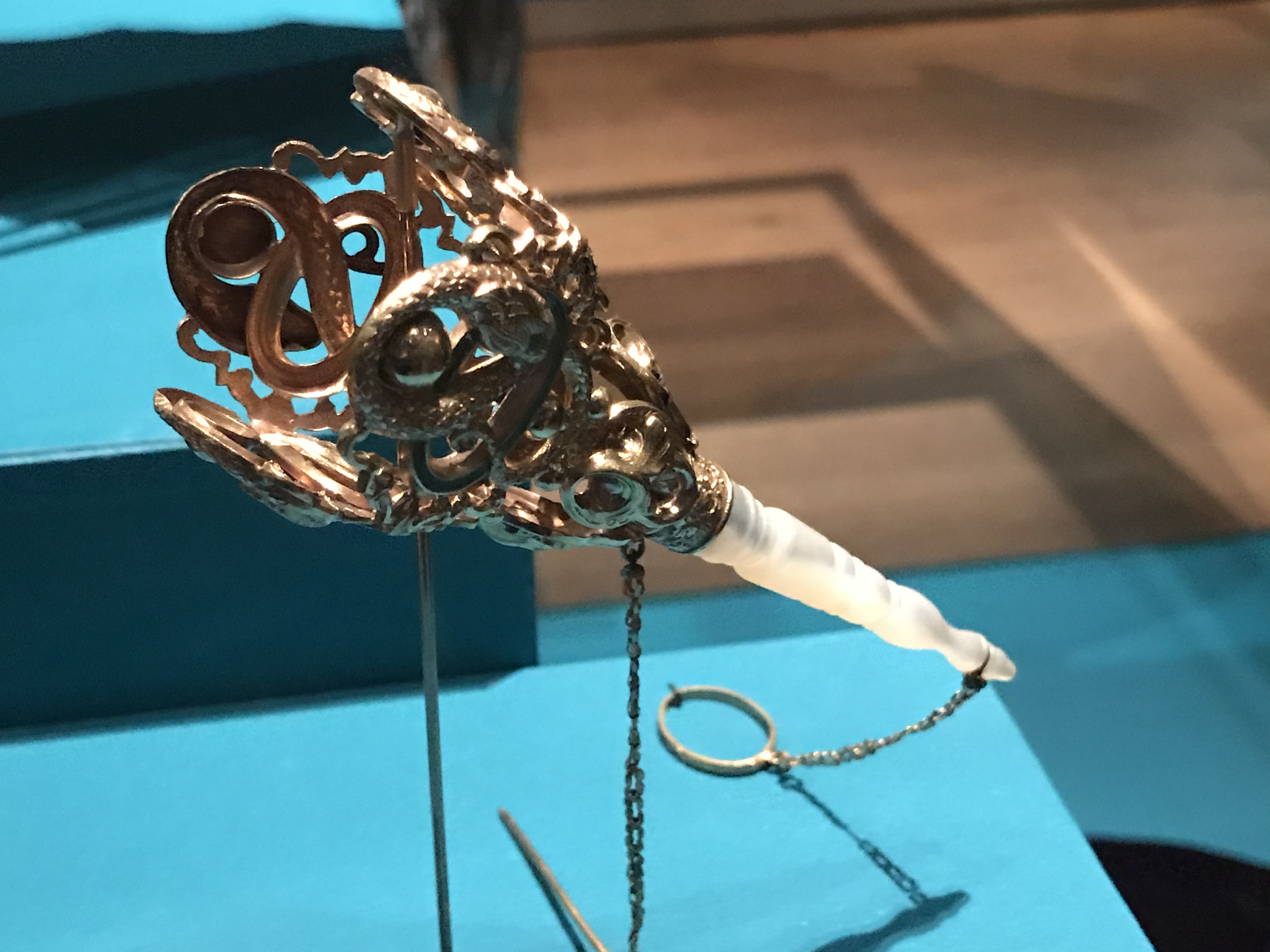
A porte-bouquet

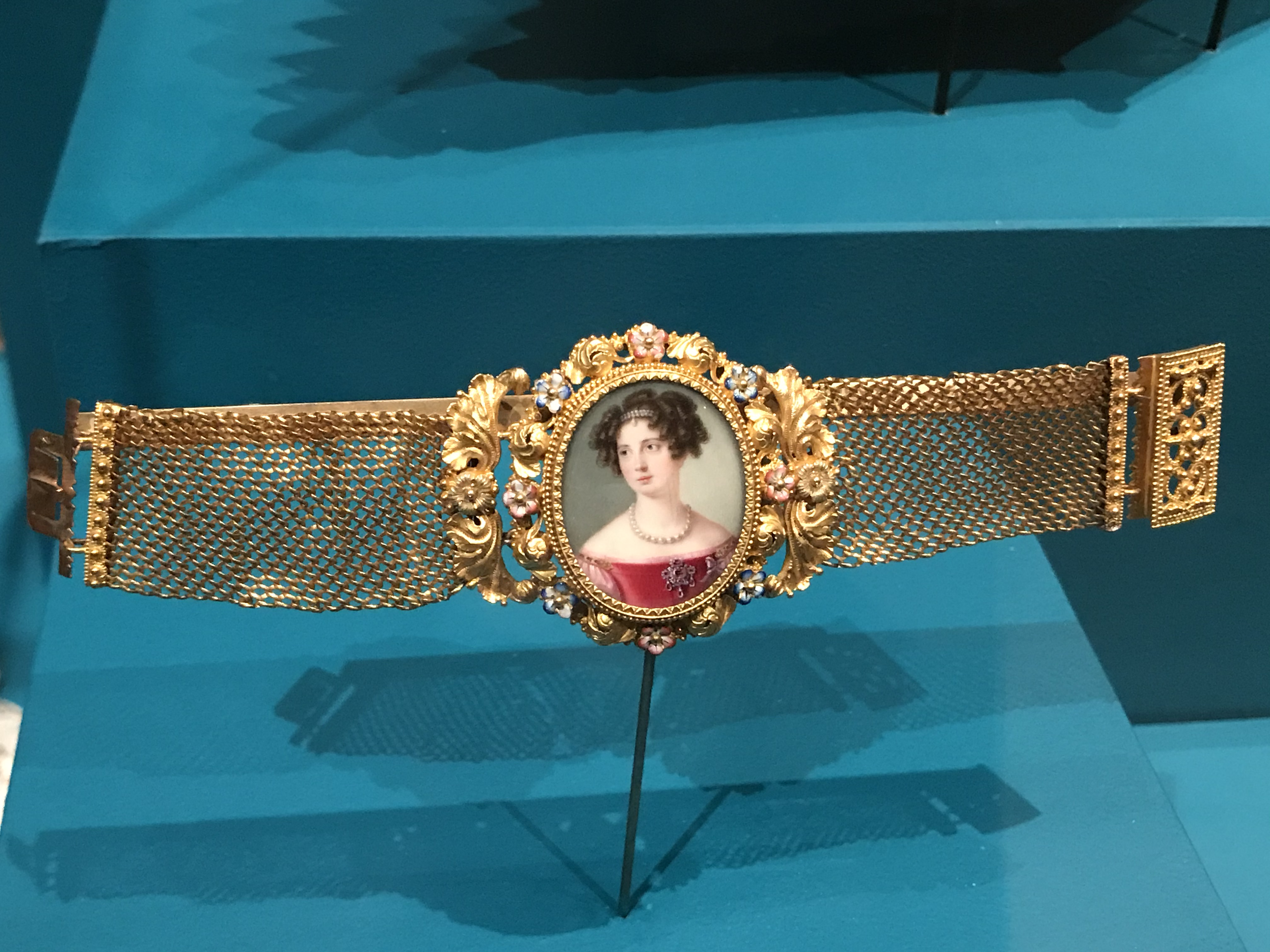
Bracelet with a portrait

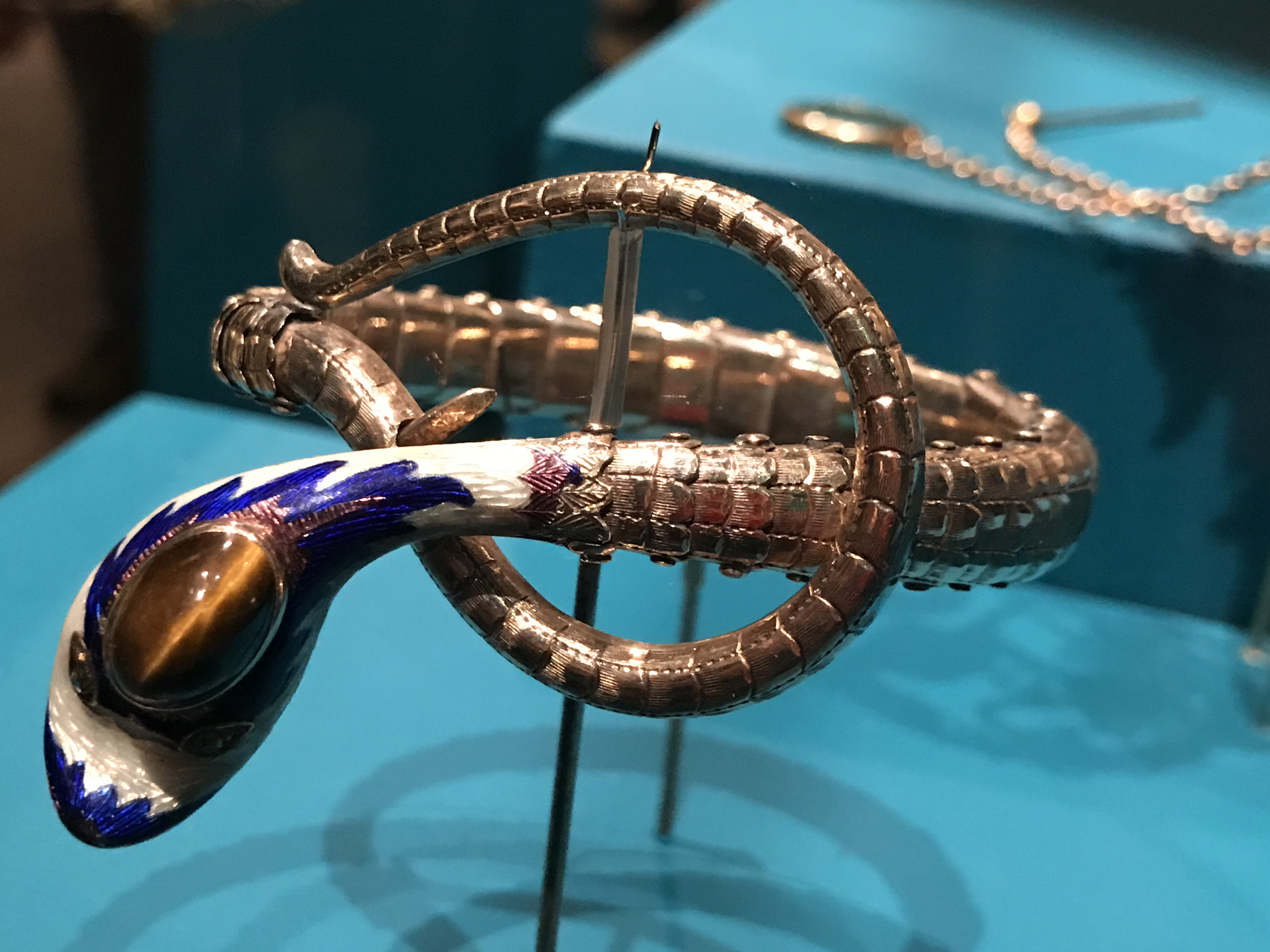
Bracelet with a serpentine form and tiger eye

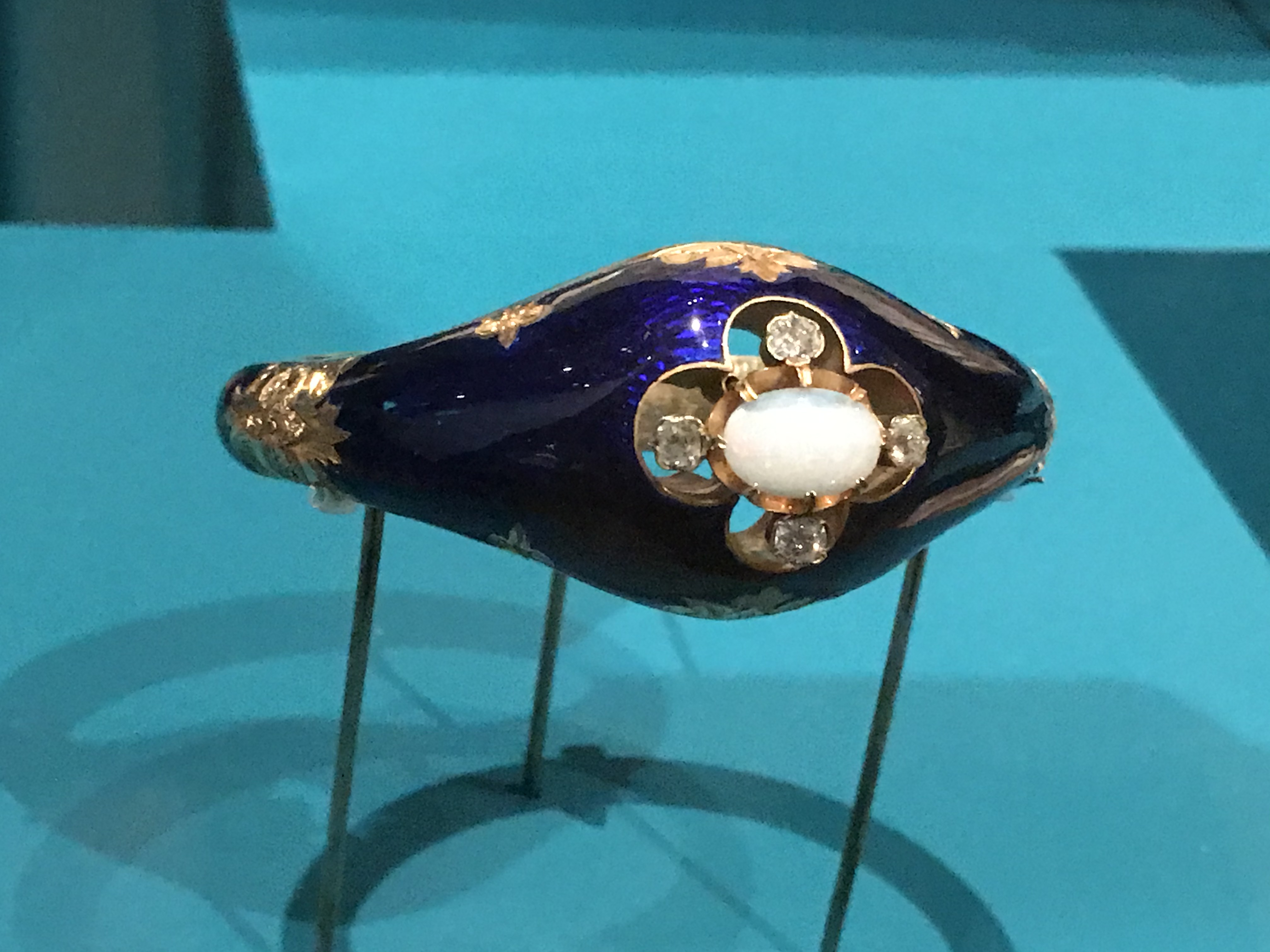
Bracelet with blue enamel and an opal

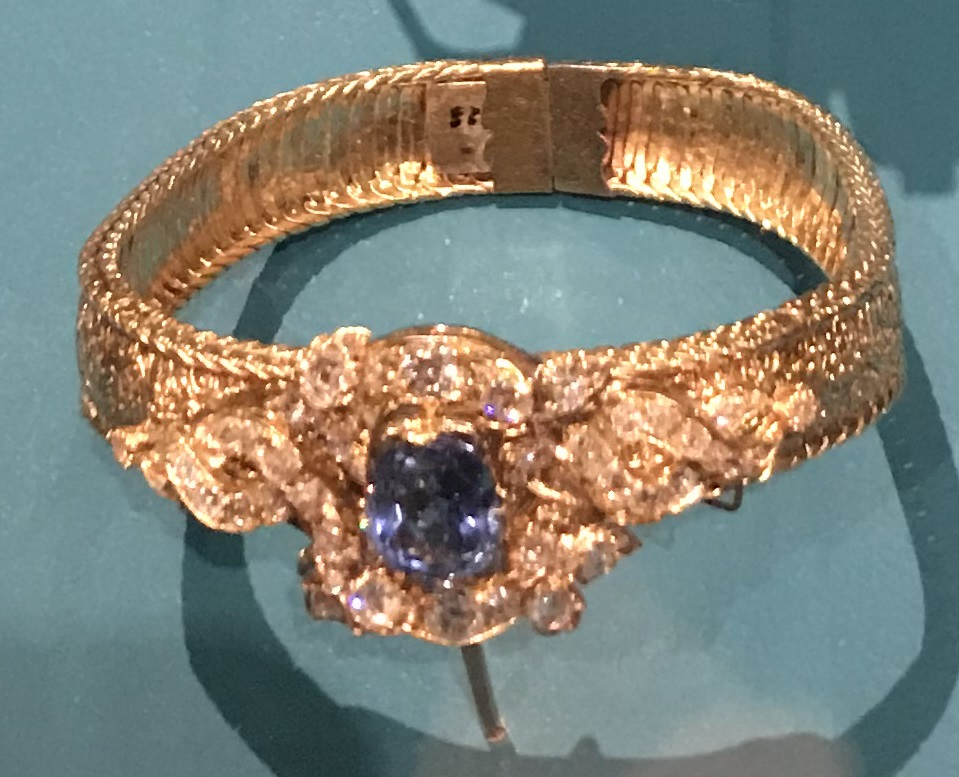
Bracelet with diamonds around a sapphire

The dresses were often designed with accessories in mind, and some examples of matching shoes were on display.

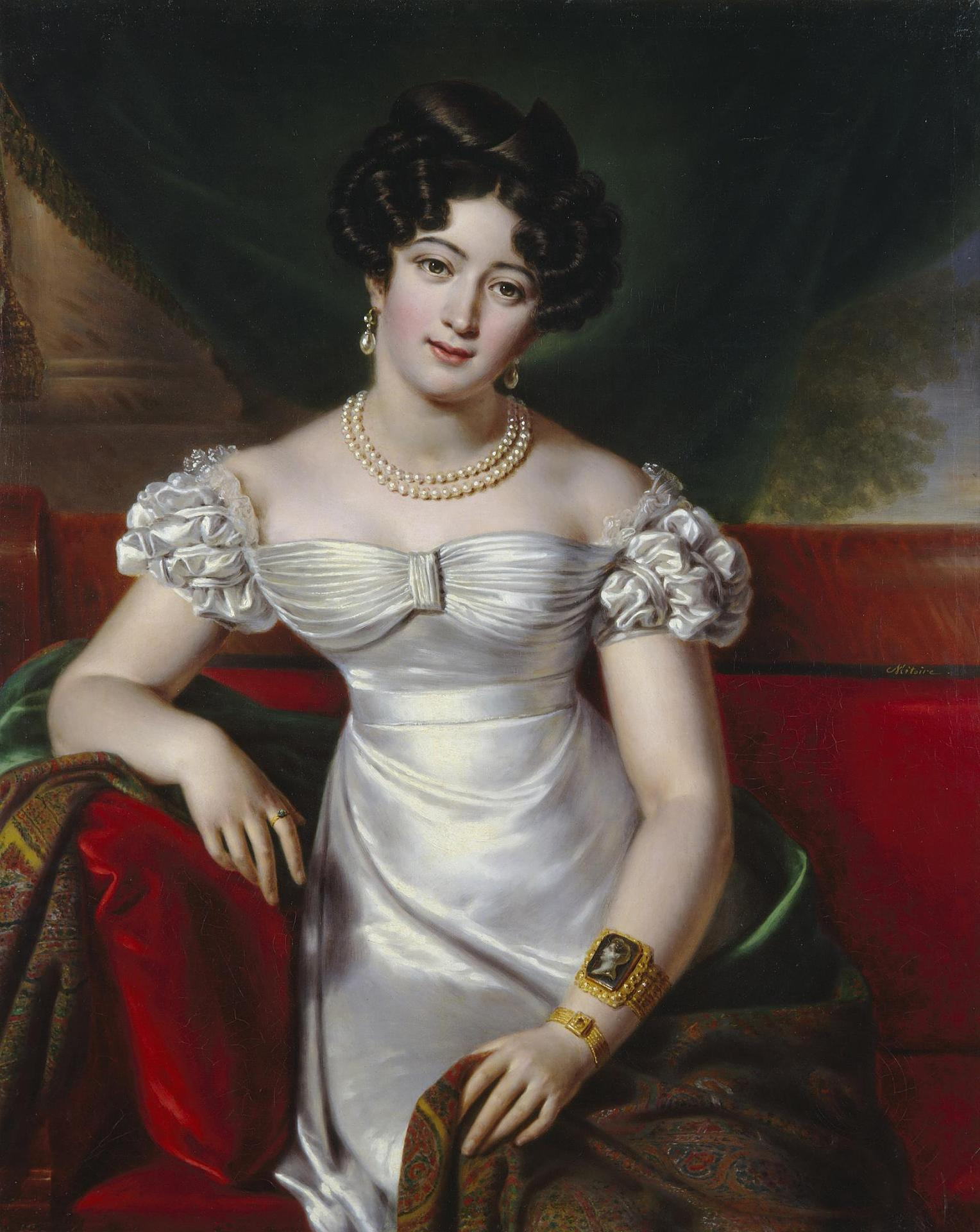
Yuliya Samoylova wearing pearls and a cameo portrait on a bracelet with an empire style gown with draped pleats

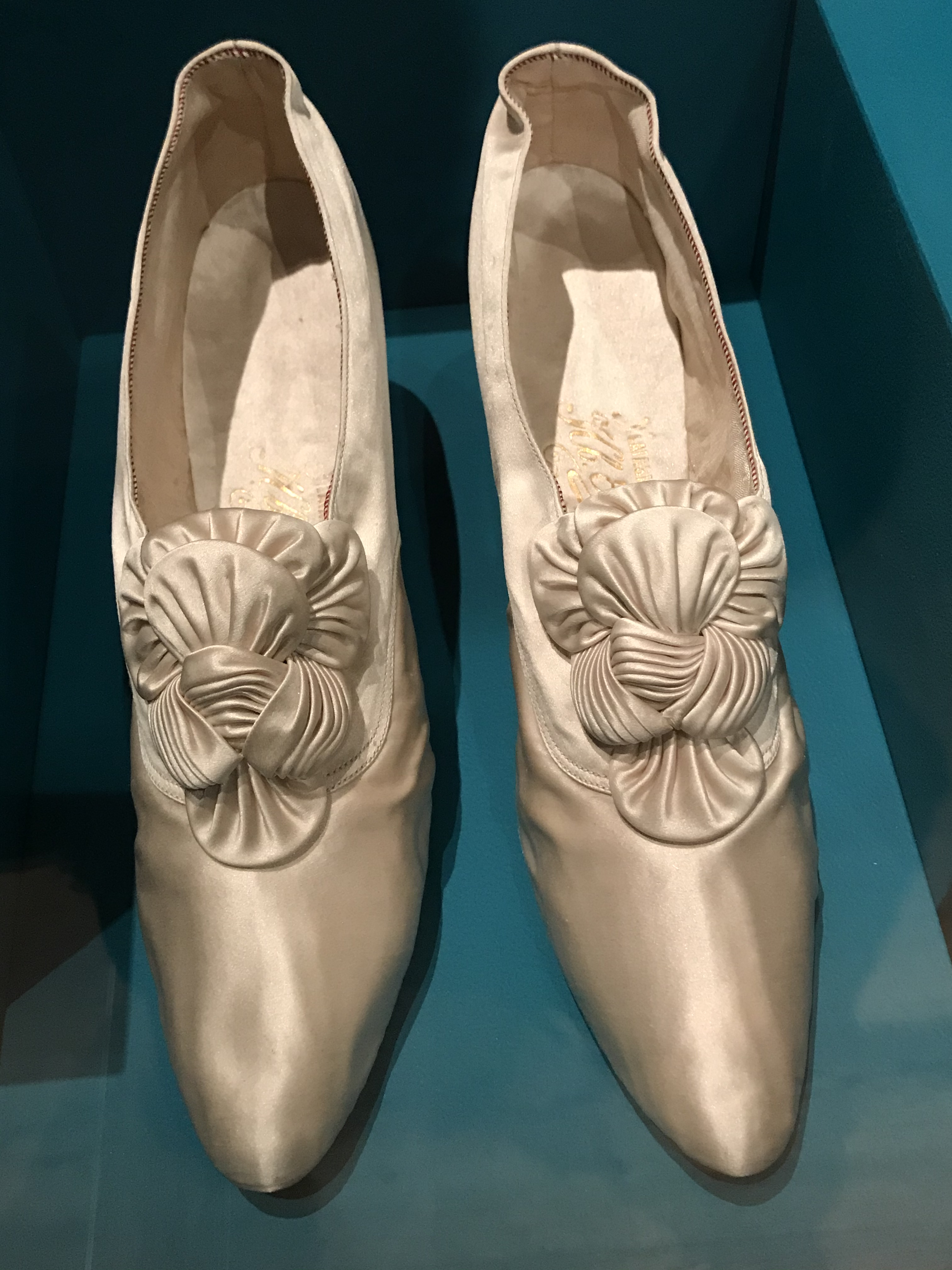
White shoes with similar pleats

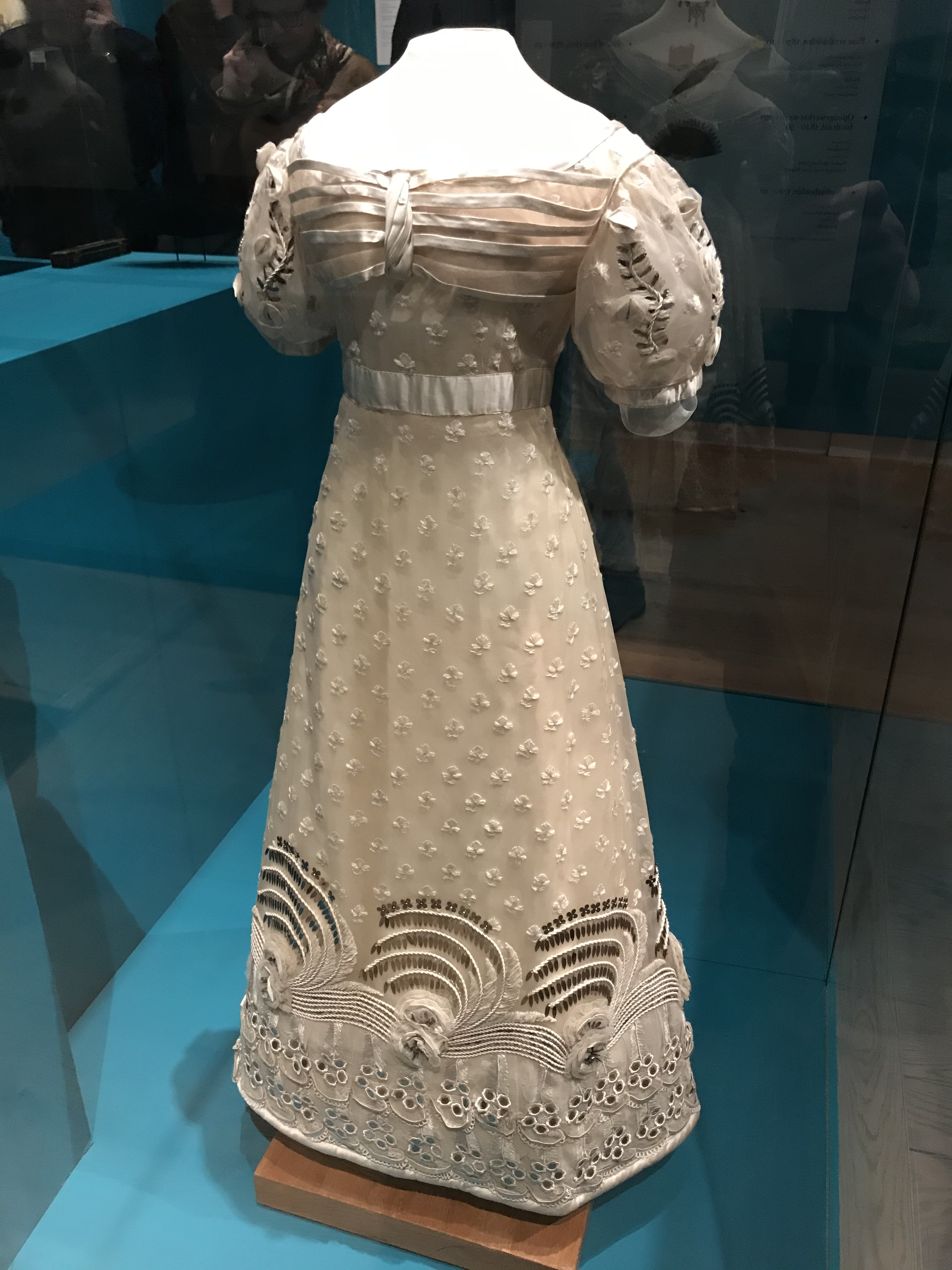
Princess Zinaida Ivanovna Yusupova's ball dress with similar bodice

== Treasury room ==
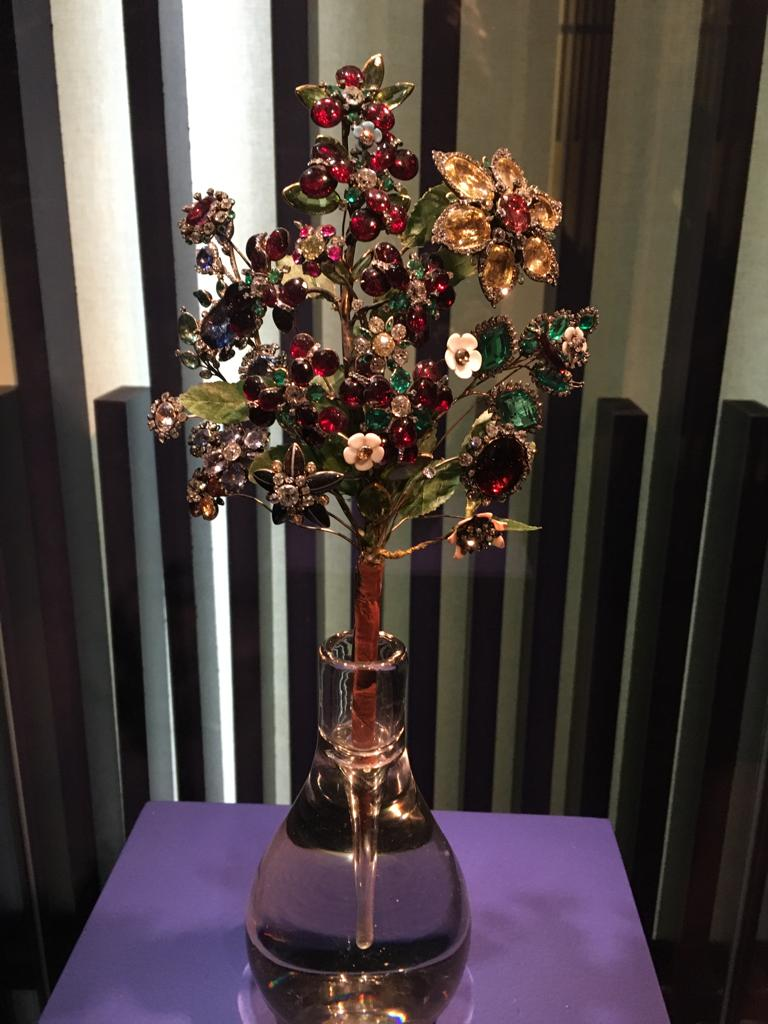
Bouquet of flowers by Jérémie Pauzié

The second major display room held objects created by jewelers which were treasured as sculptures. Many unusual snuffboxes were probably collected by Catherine II. The main attraction was a bouquet made of gems meant to be worn as a corsage, though the bodice of the dress to bear it would need to be very strong to carry it. Today it is displayed in a vase.

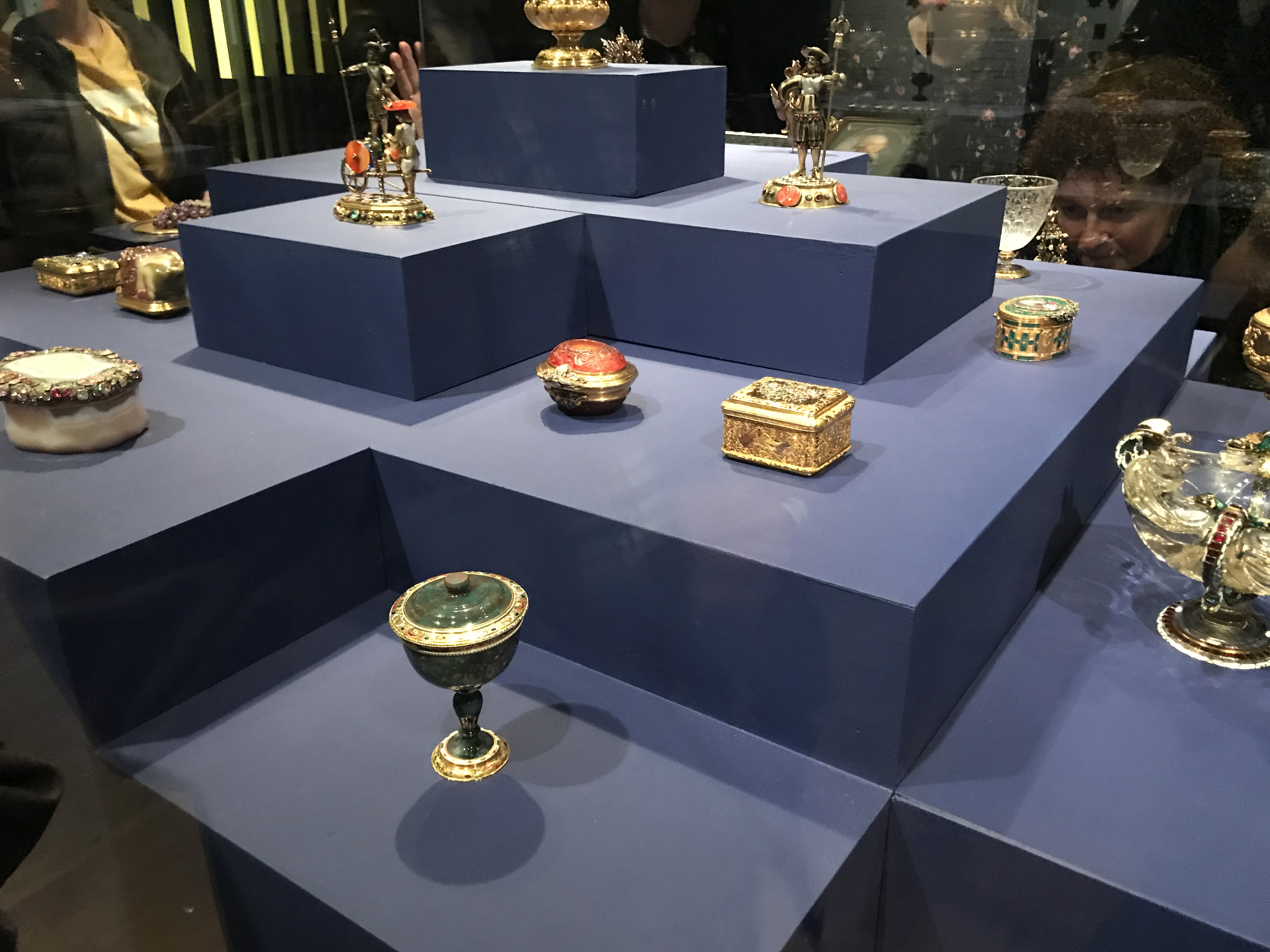
Overview of a display in the Treasury room

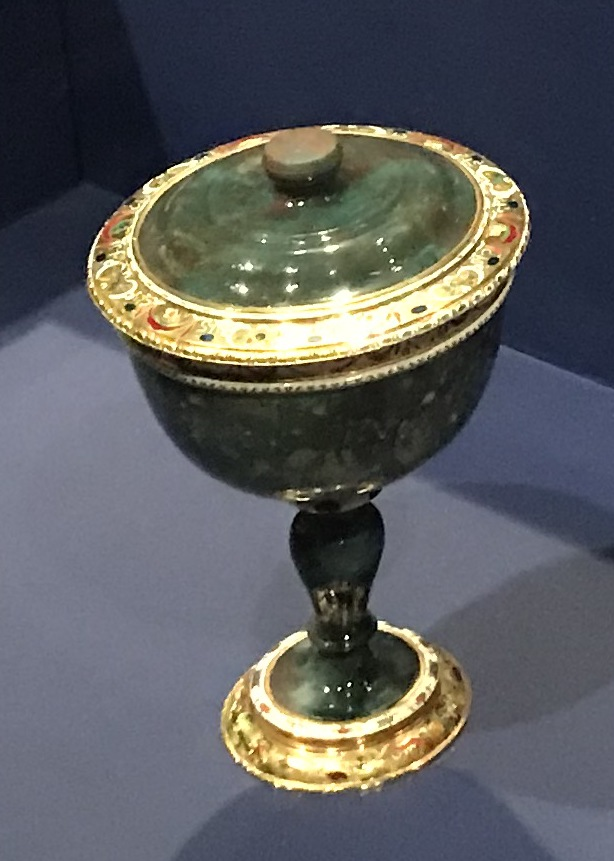
Goblet by Ottavio Miseroni

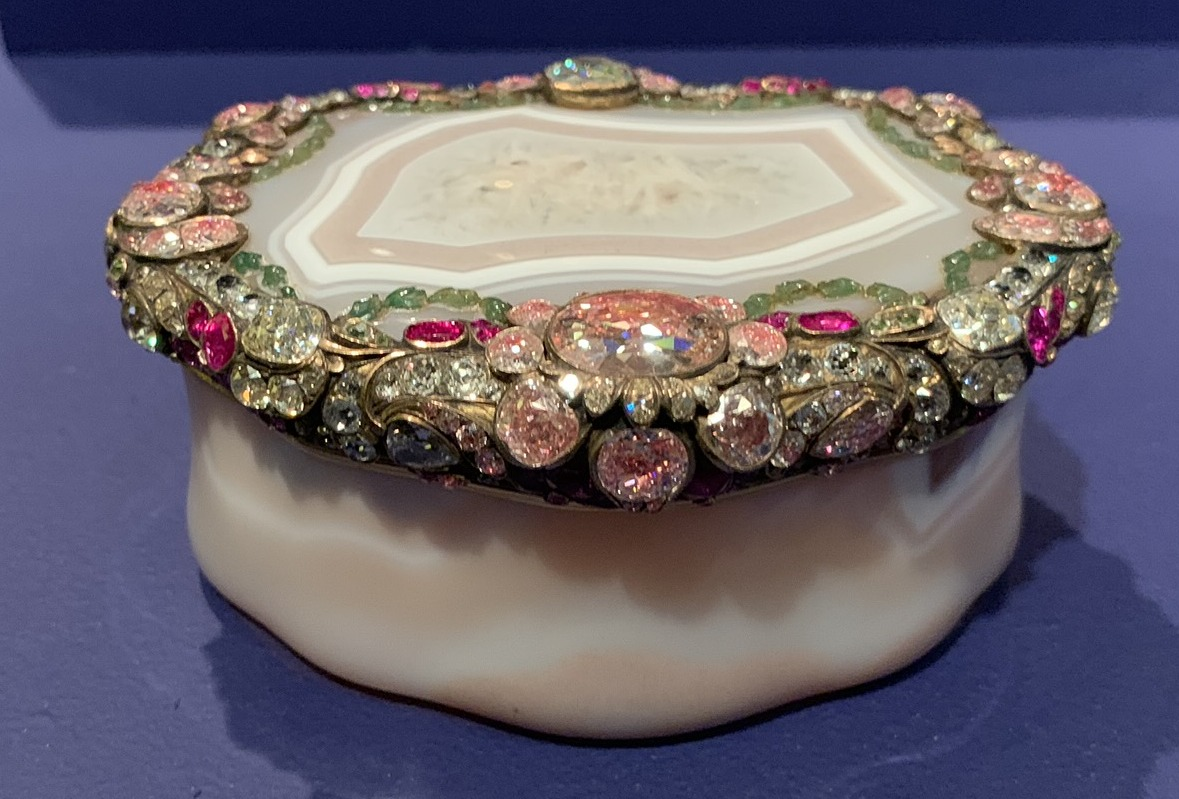
Snuffbox of Frederick the Great

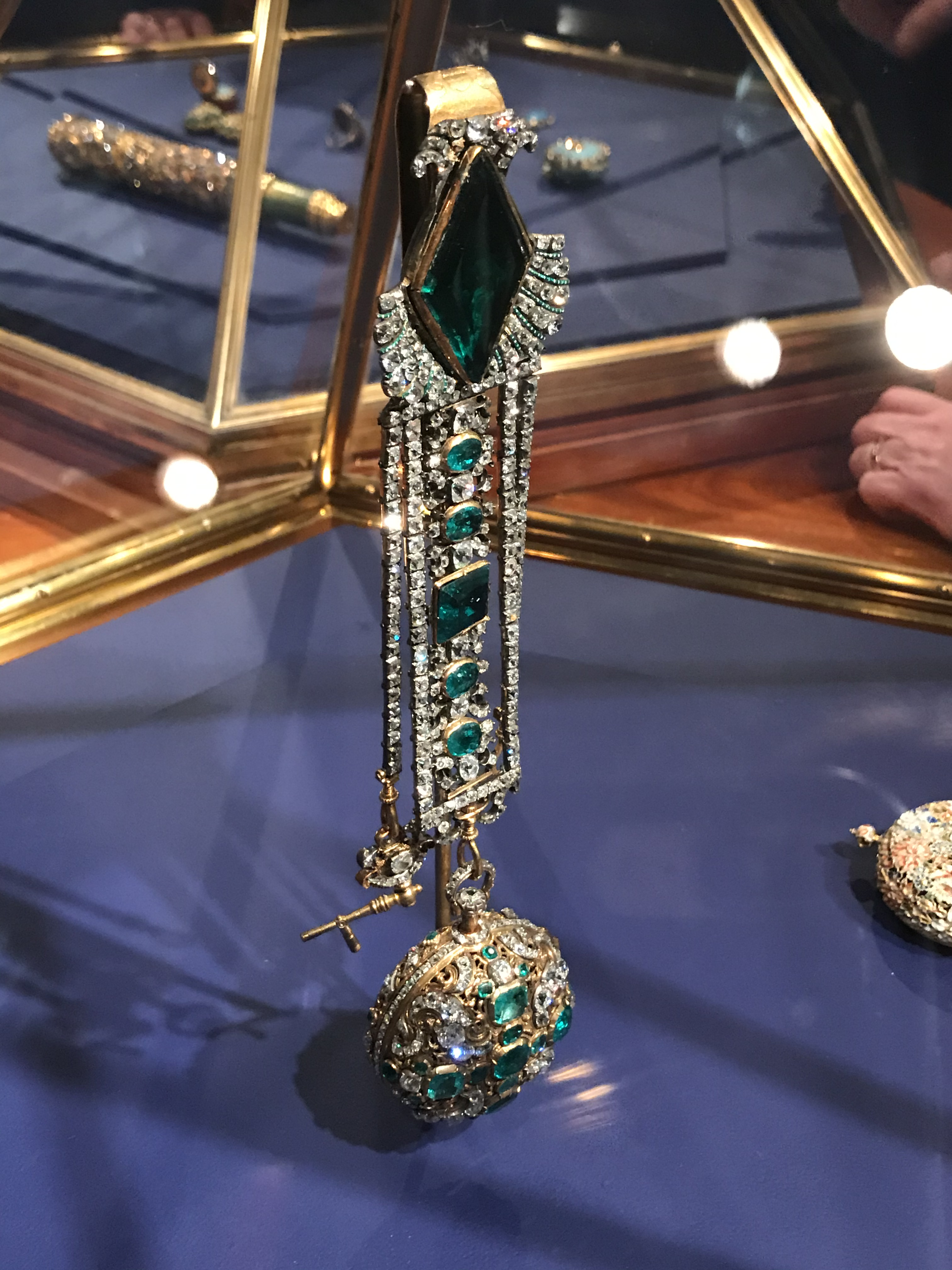
Emerald and diamond chatelaine with watch in antique Hermitage display case

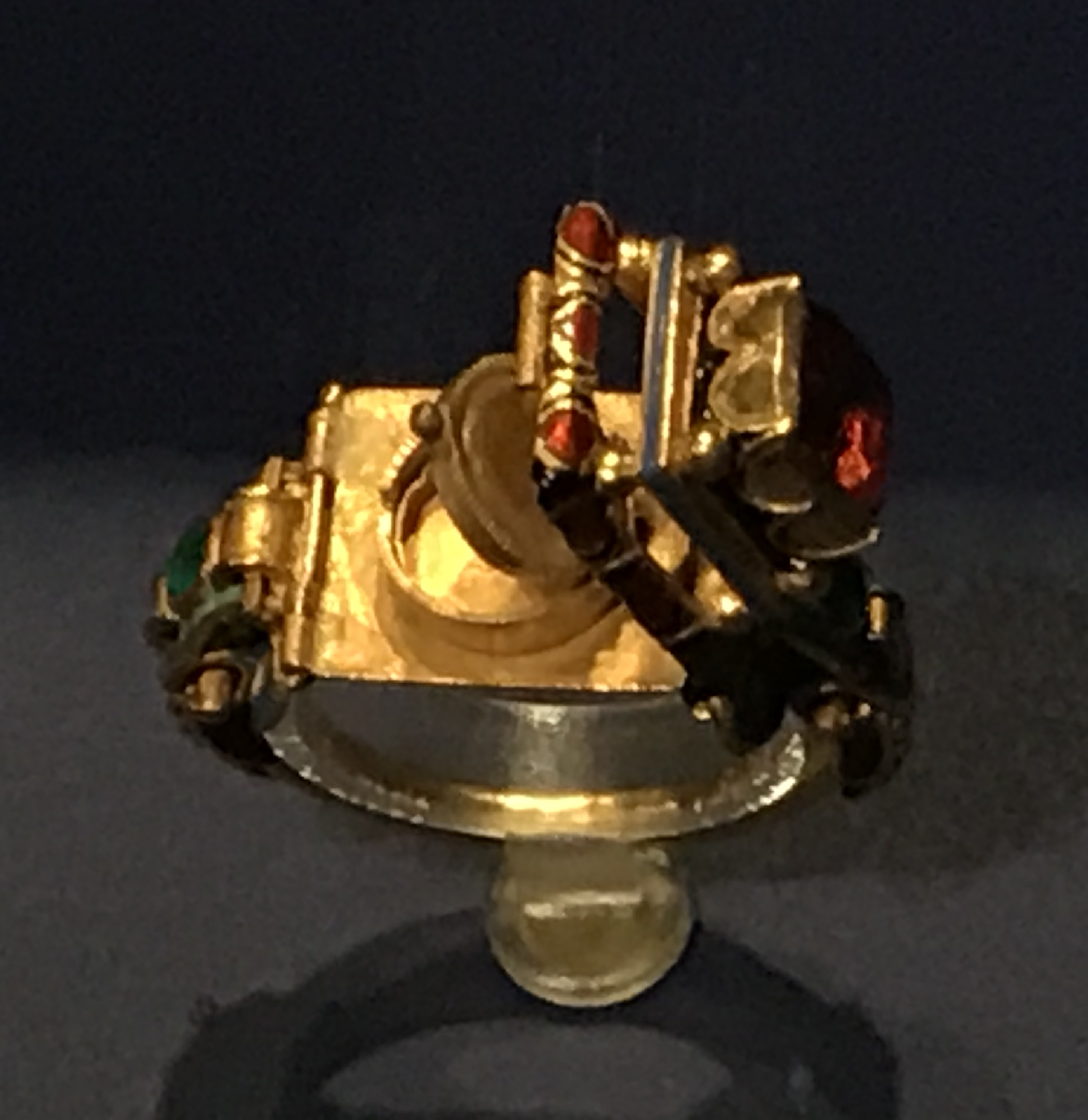
A poison ring

== Upstairs ==
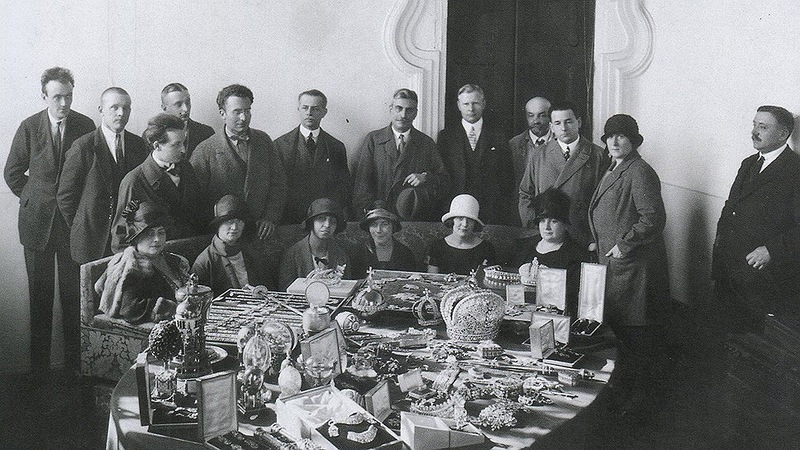
A photo taken circa 1918 and published in 1922, with the Romanov Imperial Russian crown jewels on display of which many were taken apart and sold. This photo was blown up and shown as a mural in an exhibition walkway.

Overshadowing the opulence is the awareness that it all ended abruptly, and a mural gave a short discussion of the losses due to the execution of the Romanov family during the 1917 revolution. In the same walkway, two court jewelers were on display, both of whom probably made works that were later sold off by the Bolsheviks.

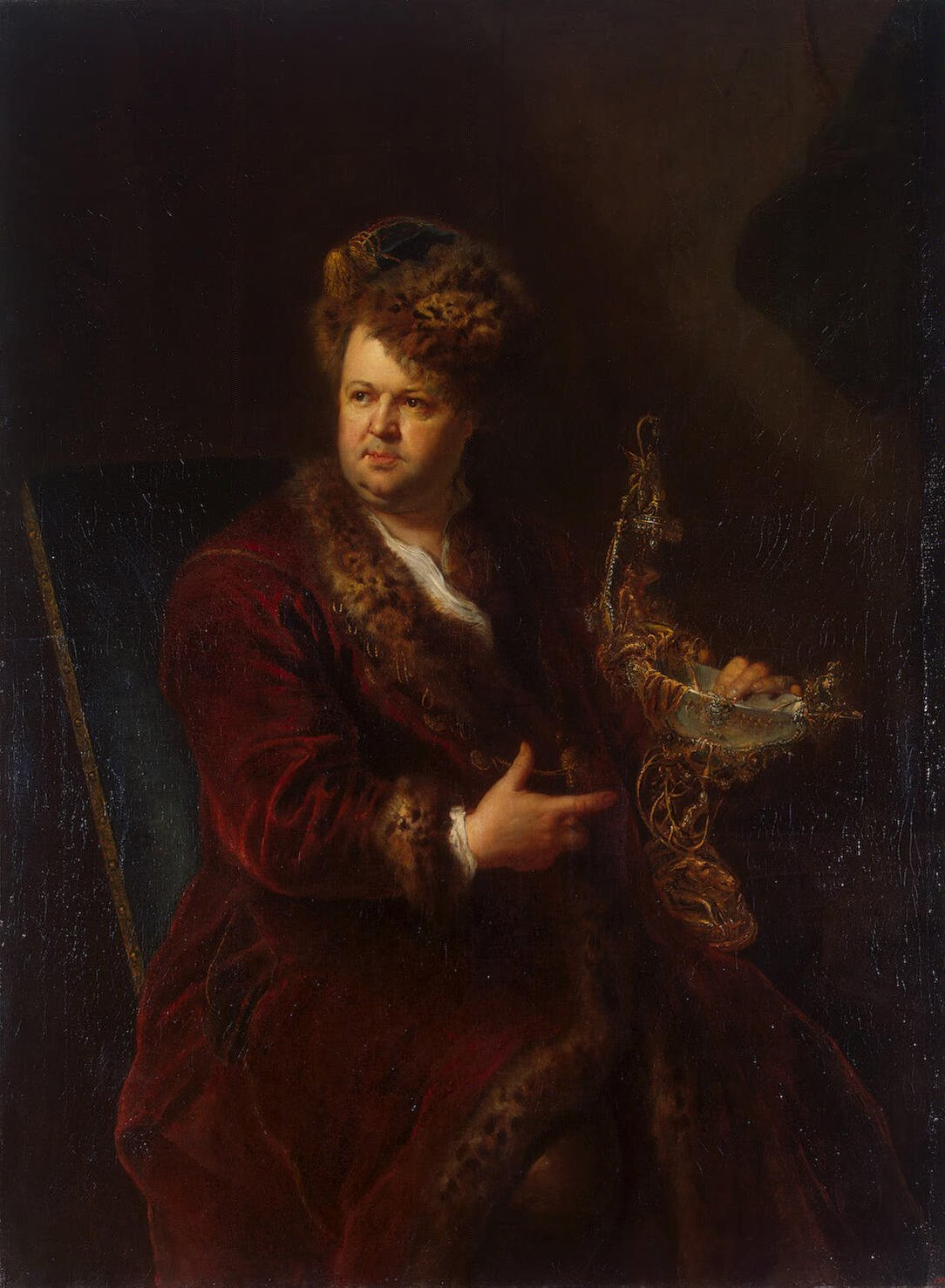
Portrait of Johann Melchior Dinglinger

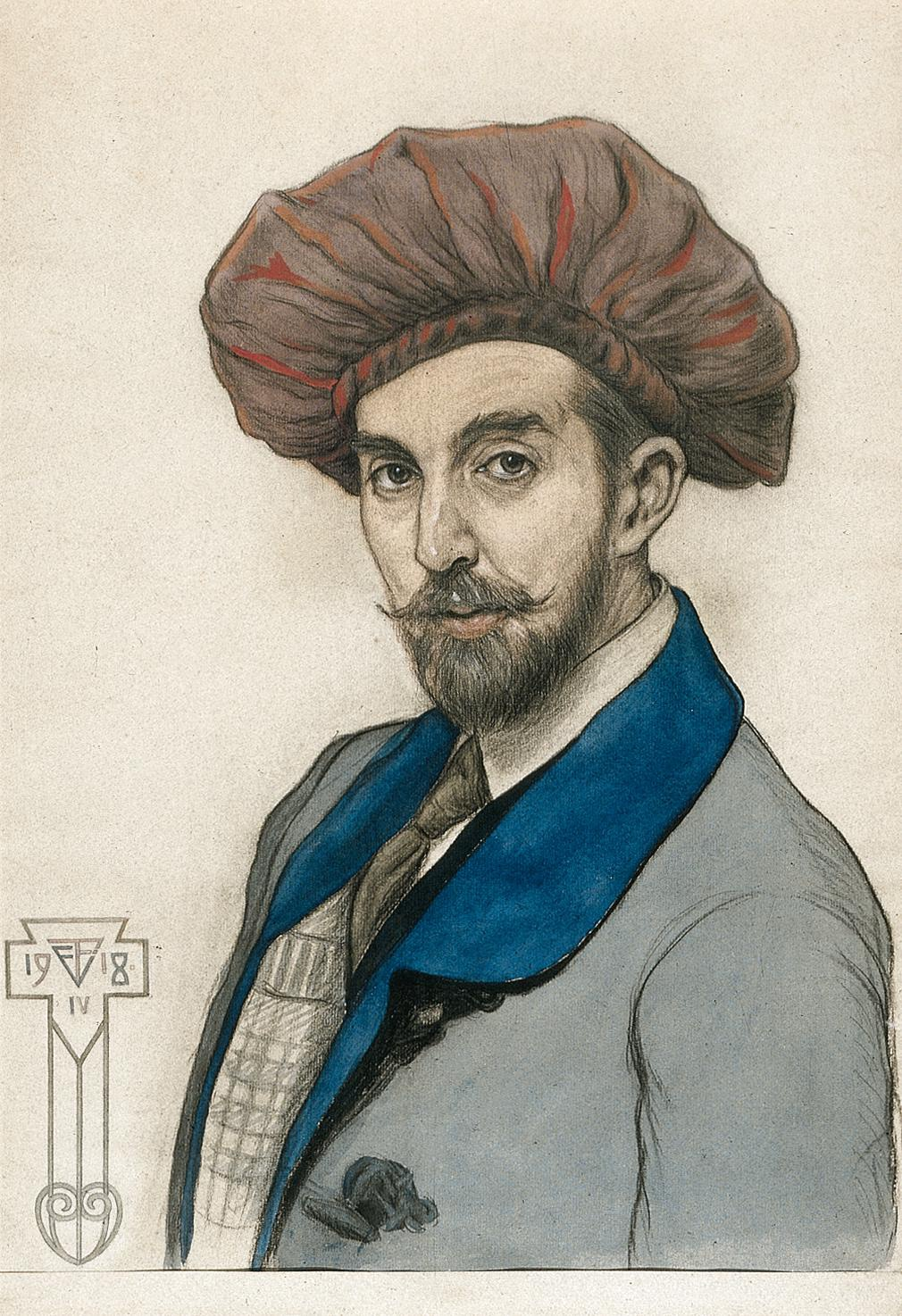
Agathon Fabergé (this self-portrait was blown up as a wall mural)

=== Catherine the Great ===
A display with items belonging to Catherine the Great showed some items from her gold toilet set which contains 46 pieces. The most remarkable personal item was a wig made of silver thread and a mid 1700s court dress.

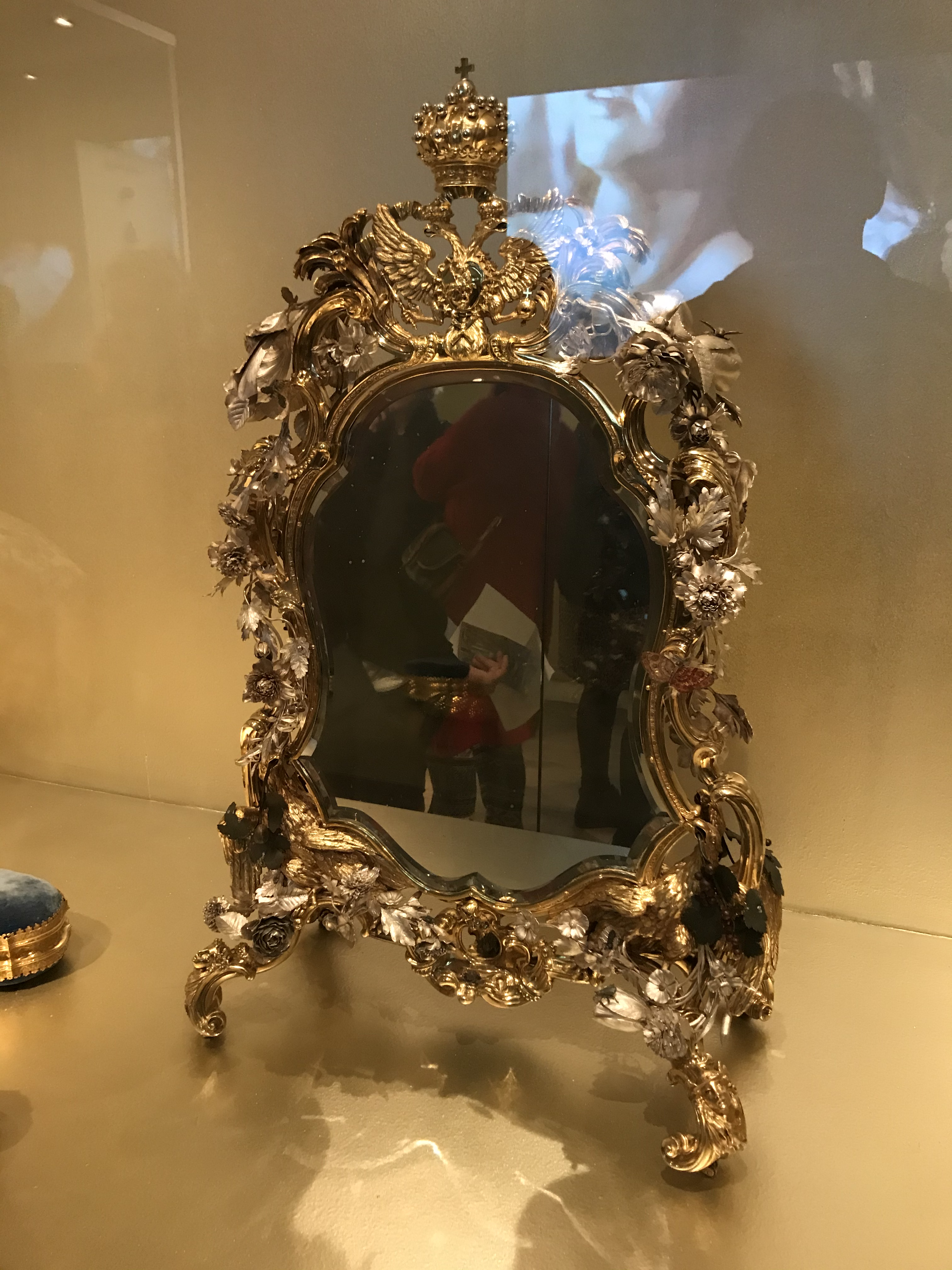
Mirror used by Catherine II

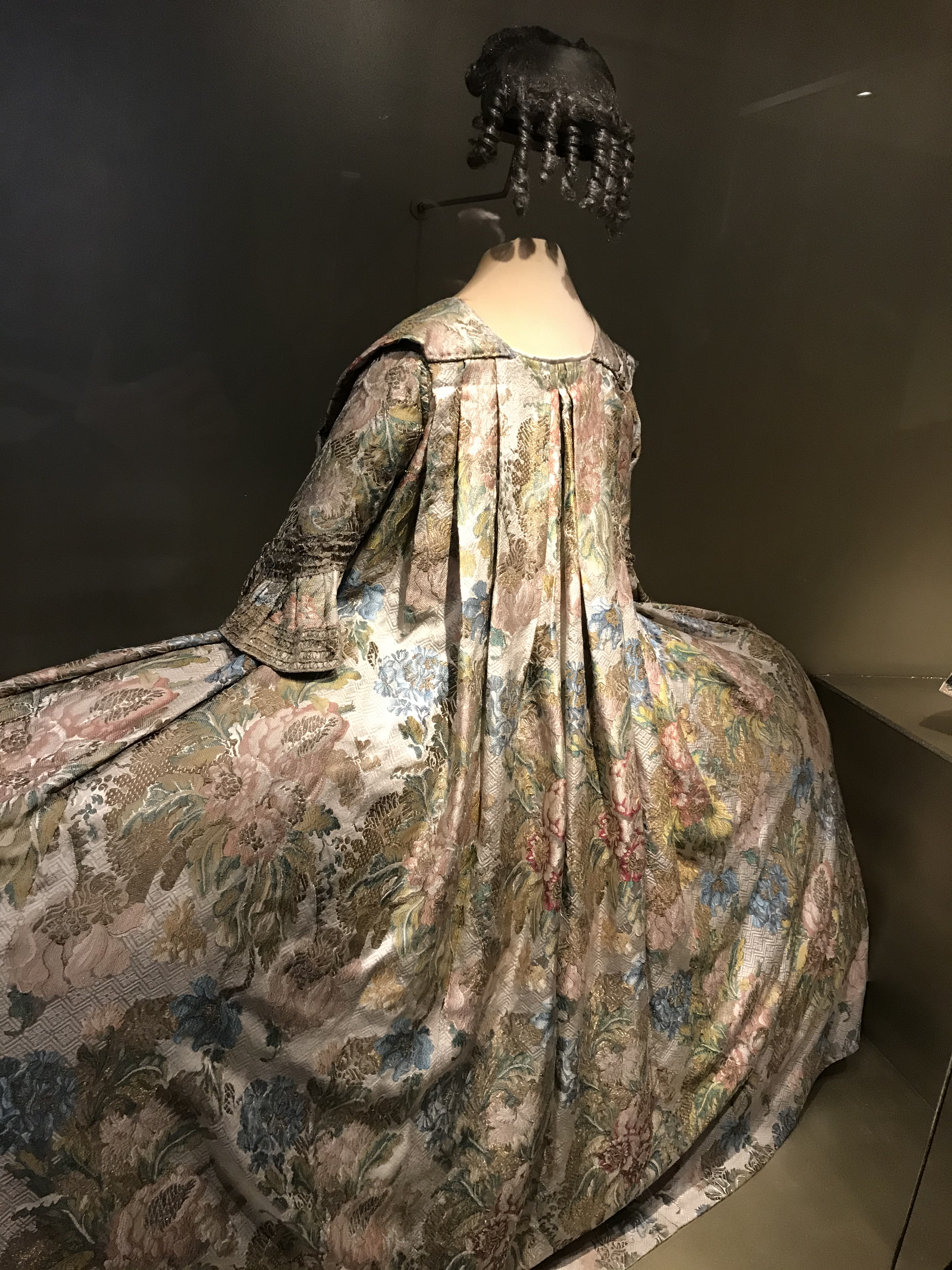
French dress with "Watteau pleat" and Catherine II's wig

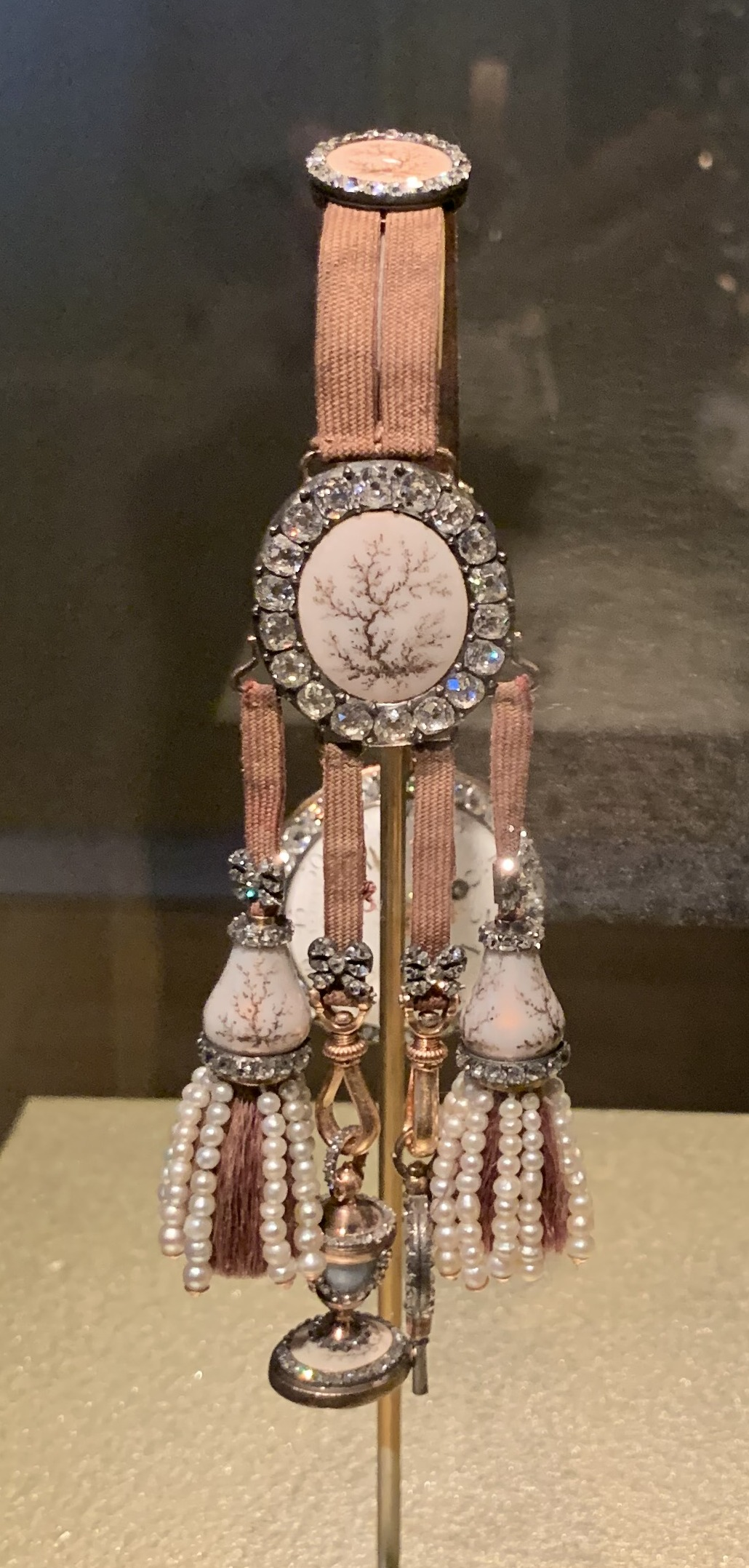
Watch and chatelaine worn by Catherine II

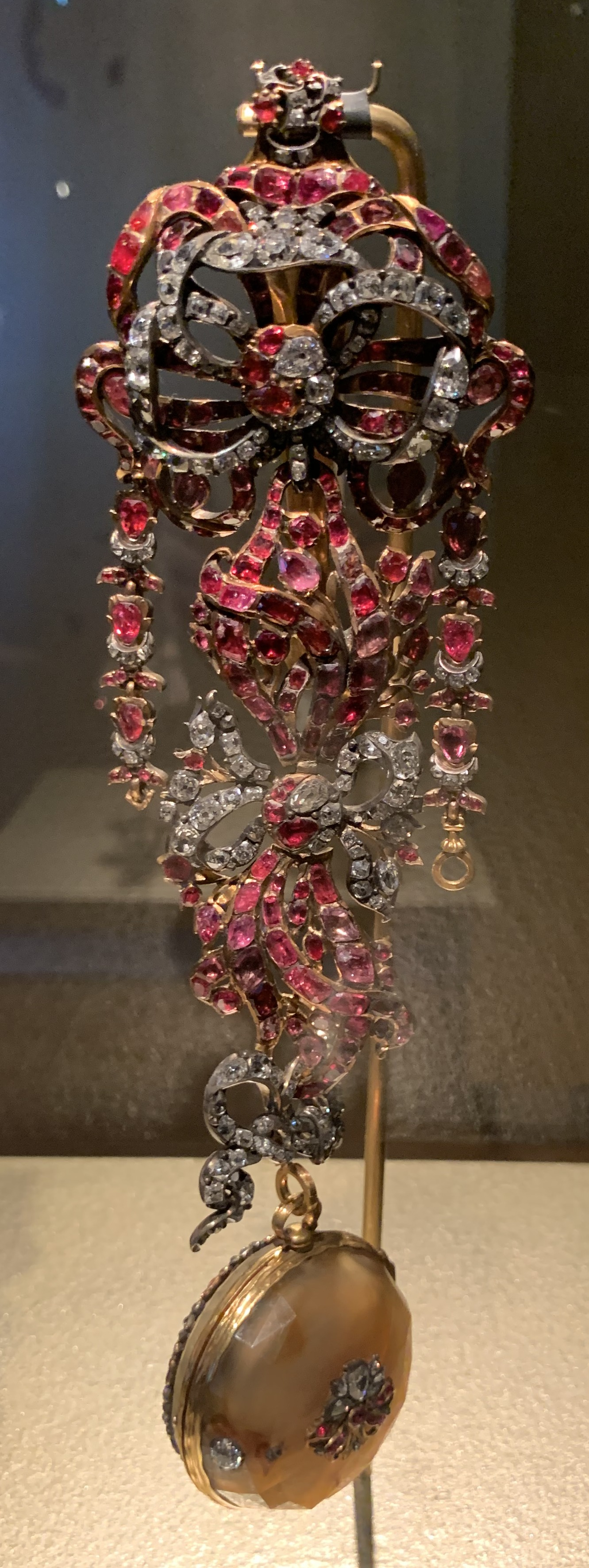
Watch and chatelaine worn by Catherine II

=== Children ===
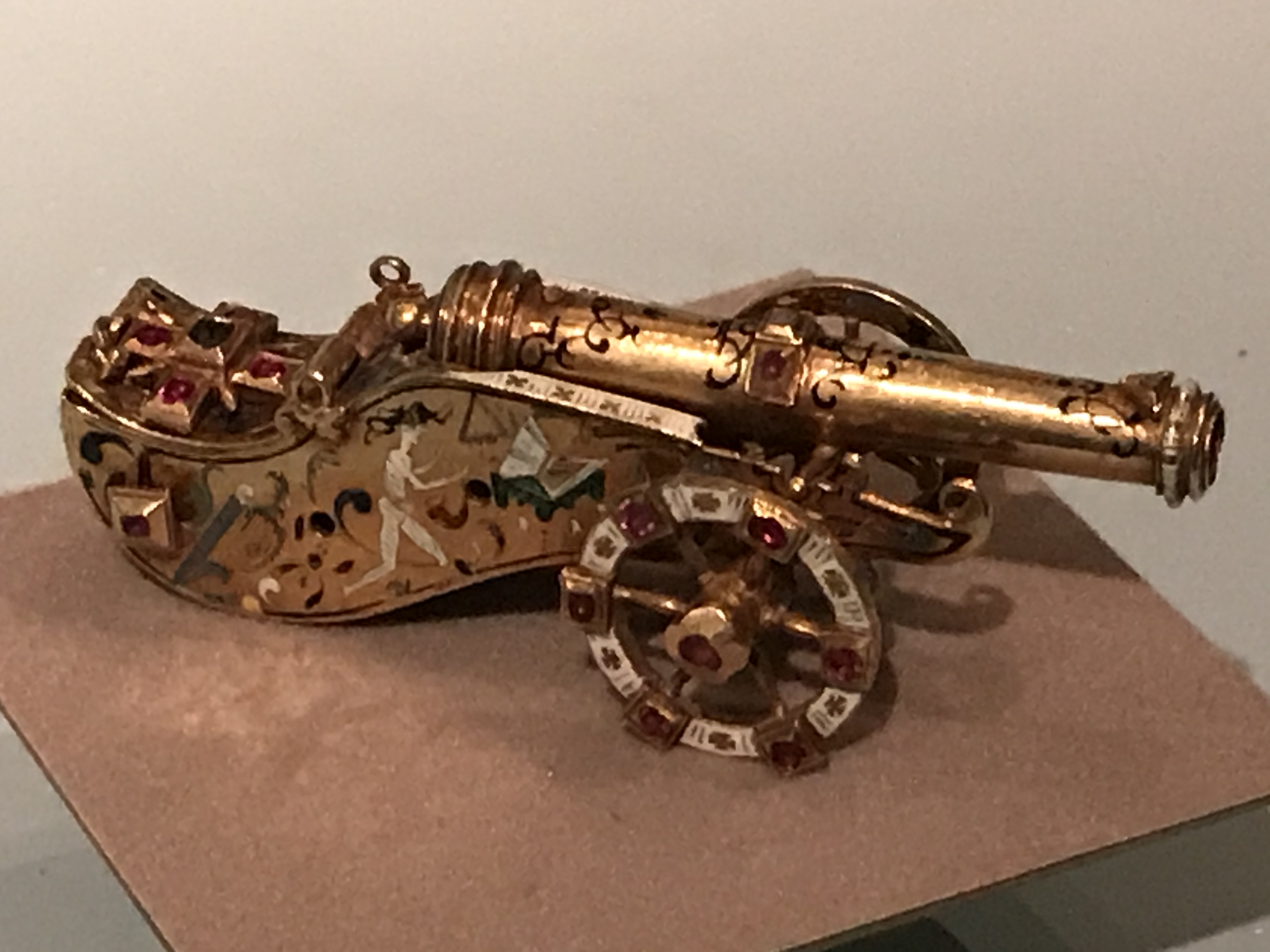
Elaborate gem-studded toy cannon

Court dress for children was just as extravagant as for adults. It is unknown whether they were allowed to play in such clothes however.

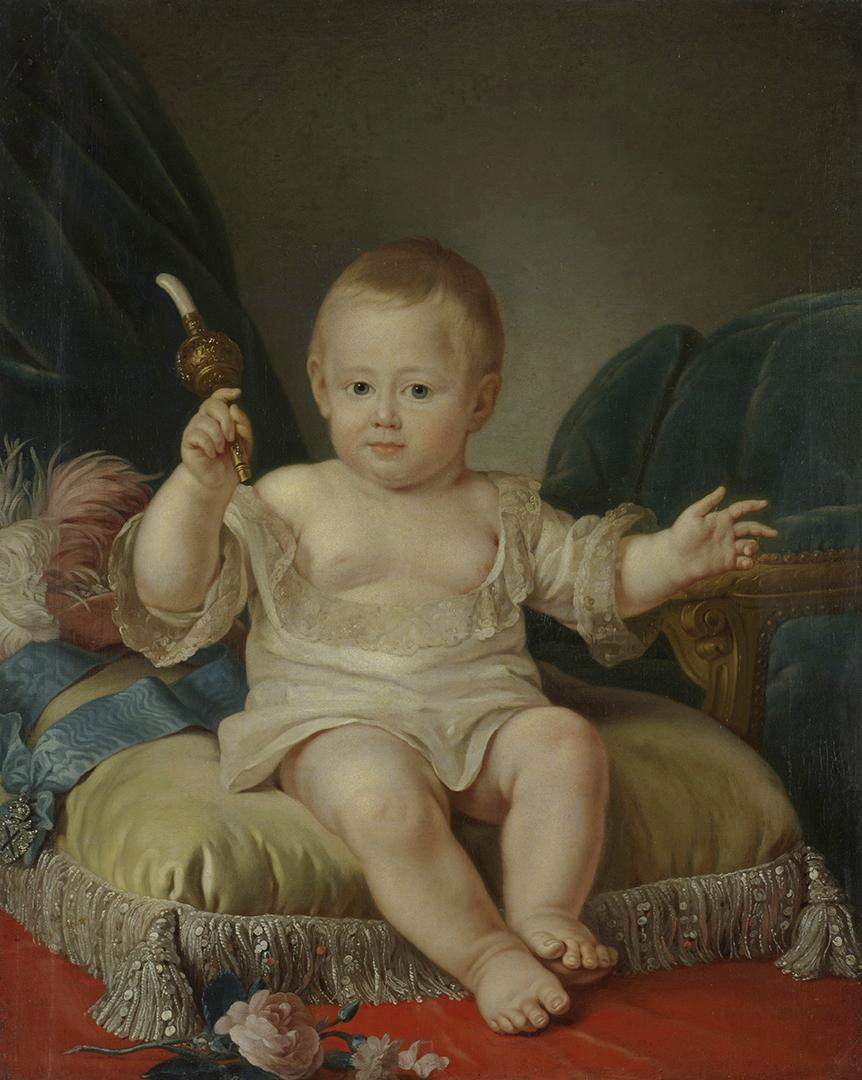
A gold rattle for Grand Duke Alexander Pavlovich

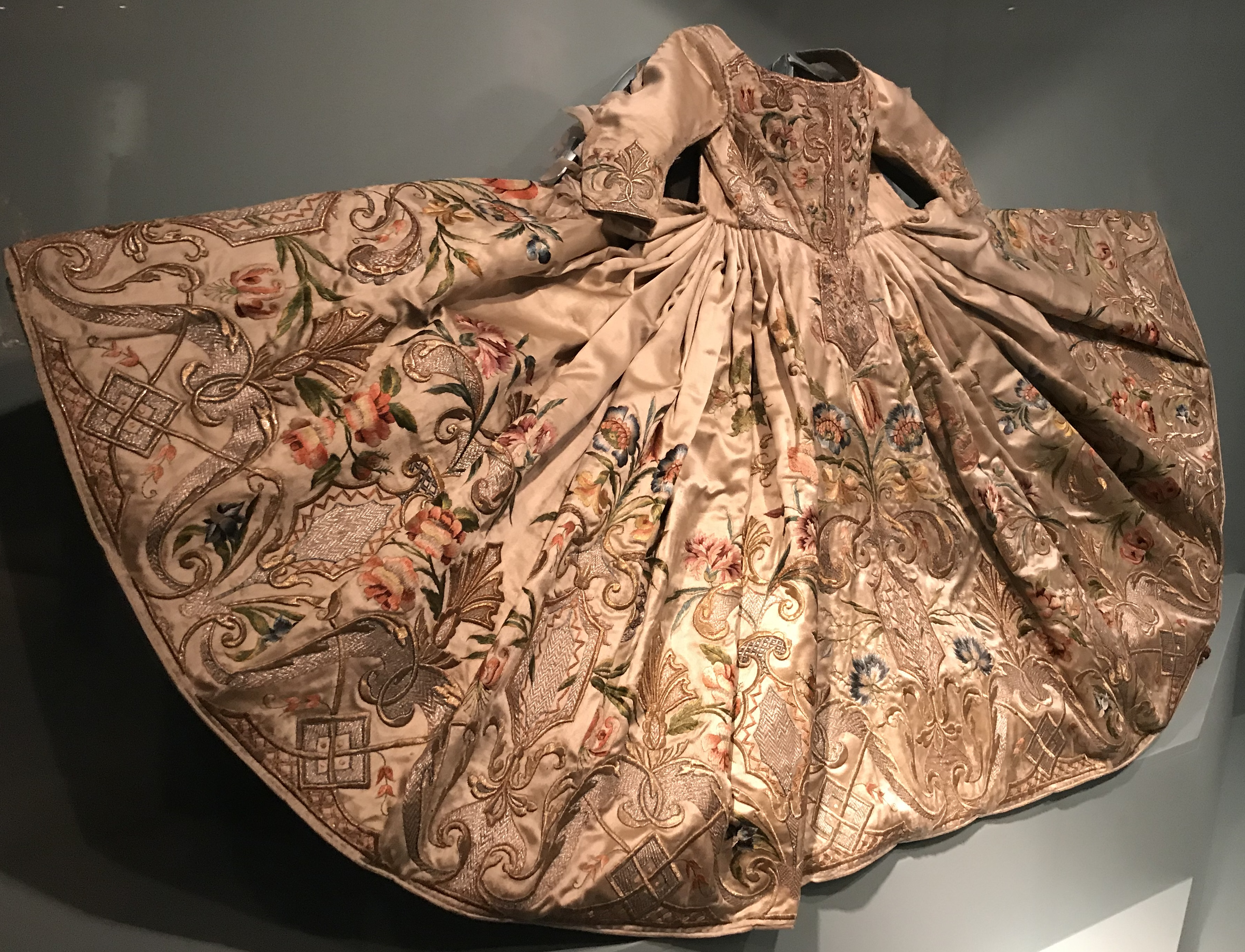
Child's embroidered dress

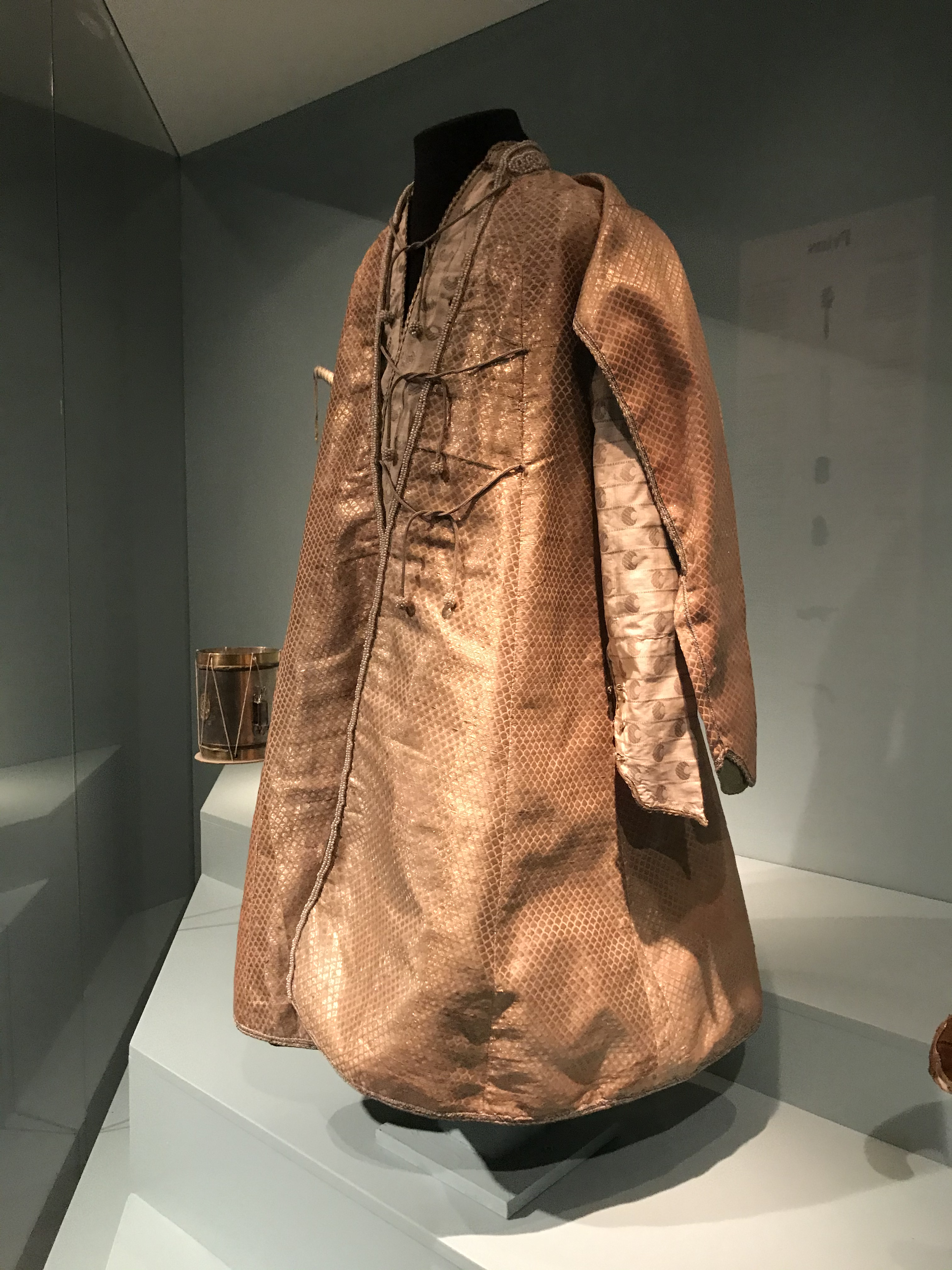
Child's kaftan edged with tiny pearls

=== Weddings ===
Various Russian wedding traditions were explained, most notably the usage of turquoise in jewellery. In the ballroom were two bracelets on loan from the Dutch Royal collection. These show Anna Pauwlowna's Russian heritage and have the bride and groom's braided hair behind their initials and their names in turquoise.

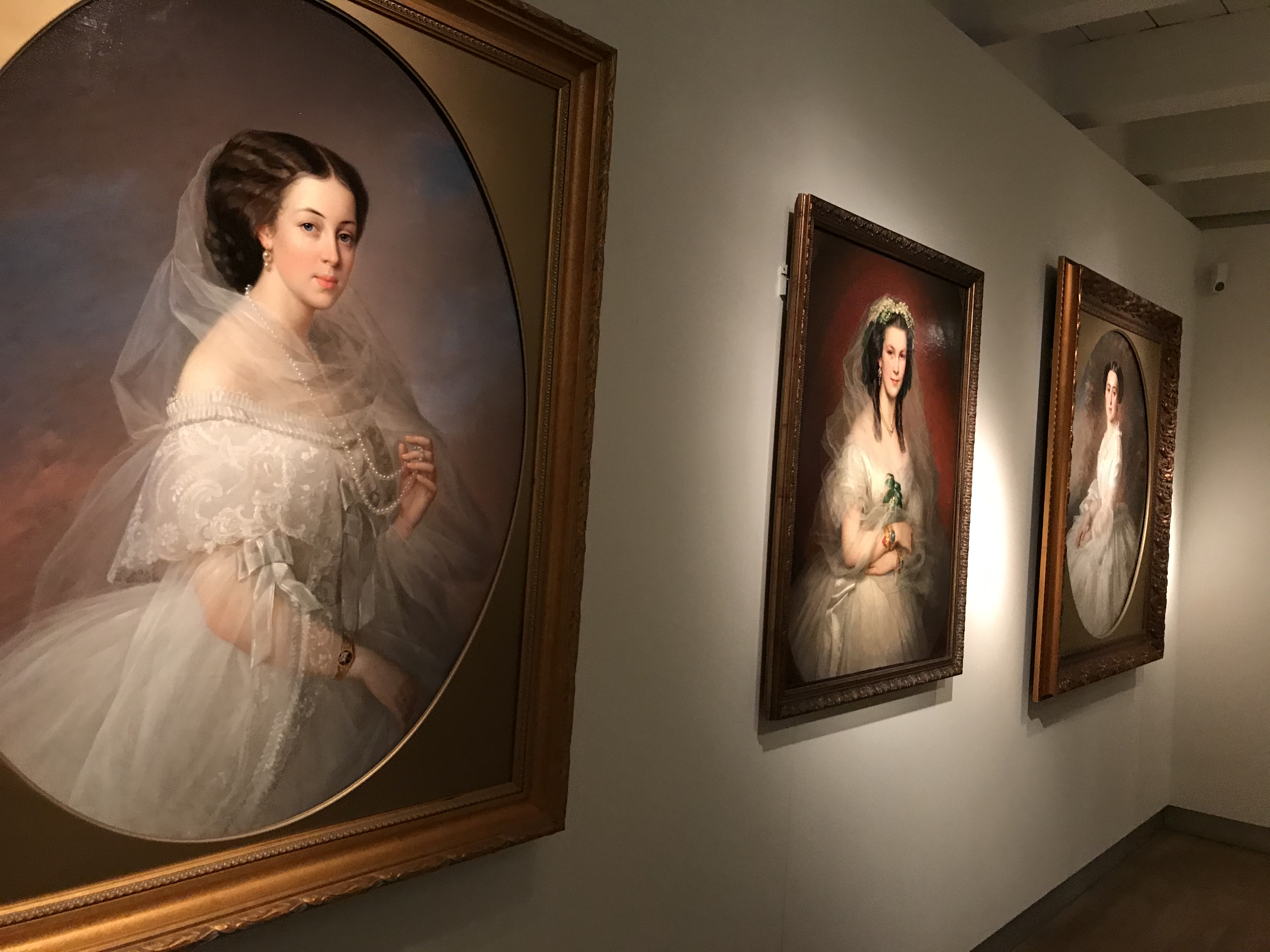
Three brides

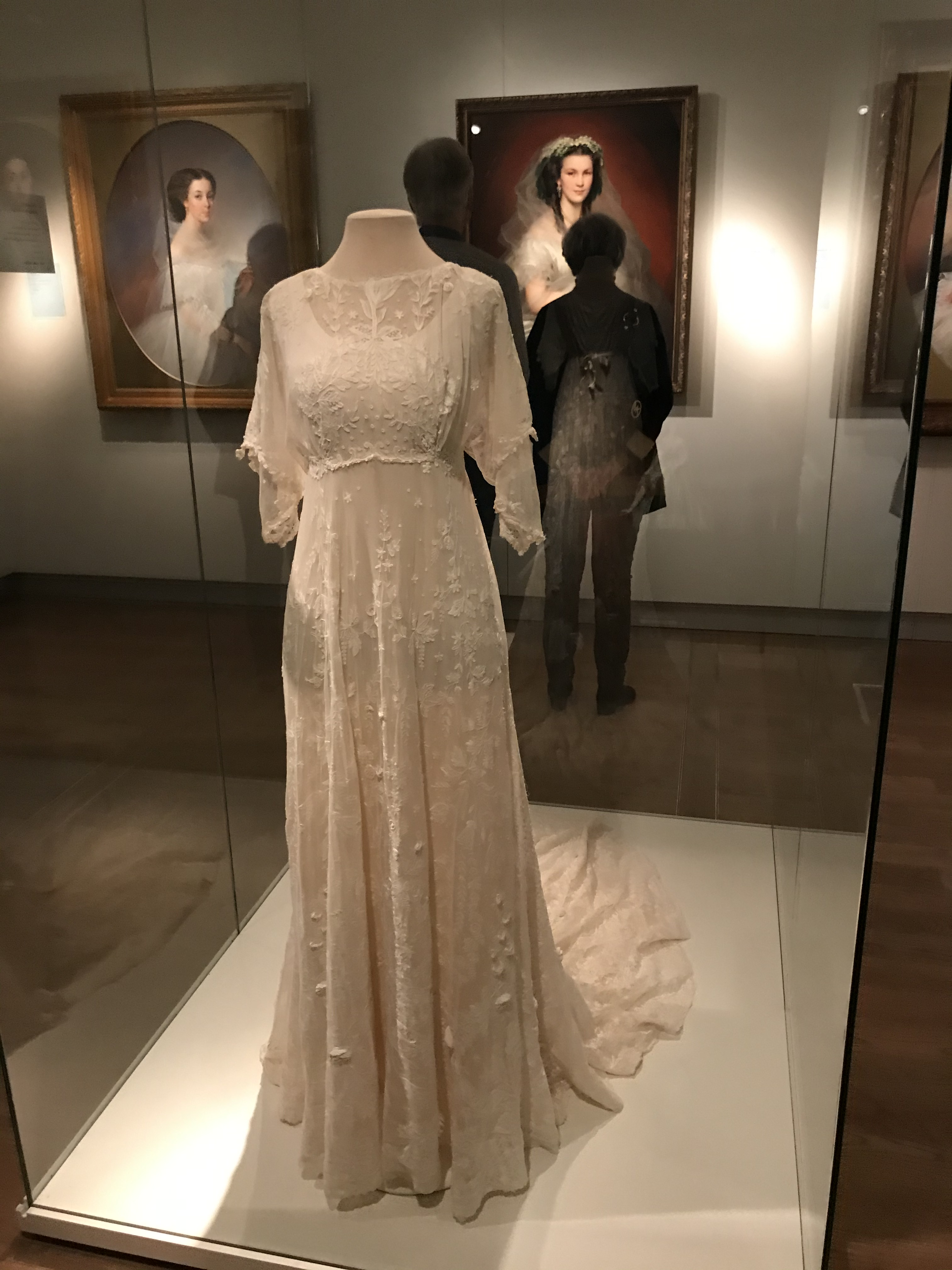
Lace wedding dress

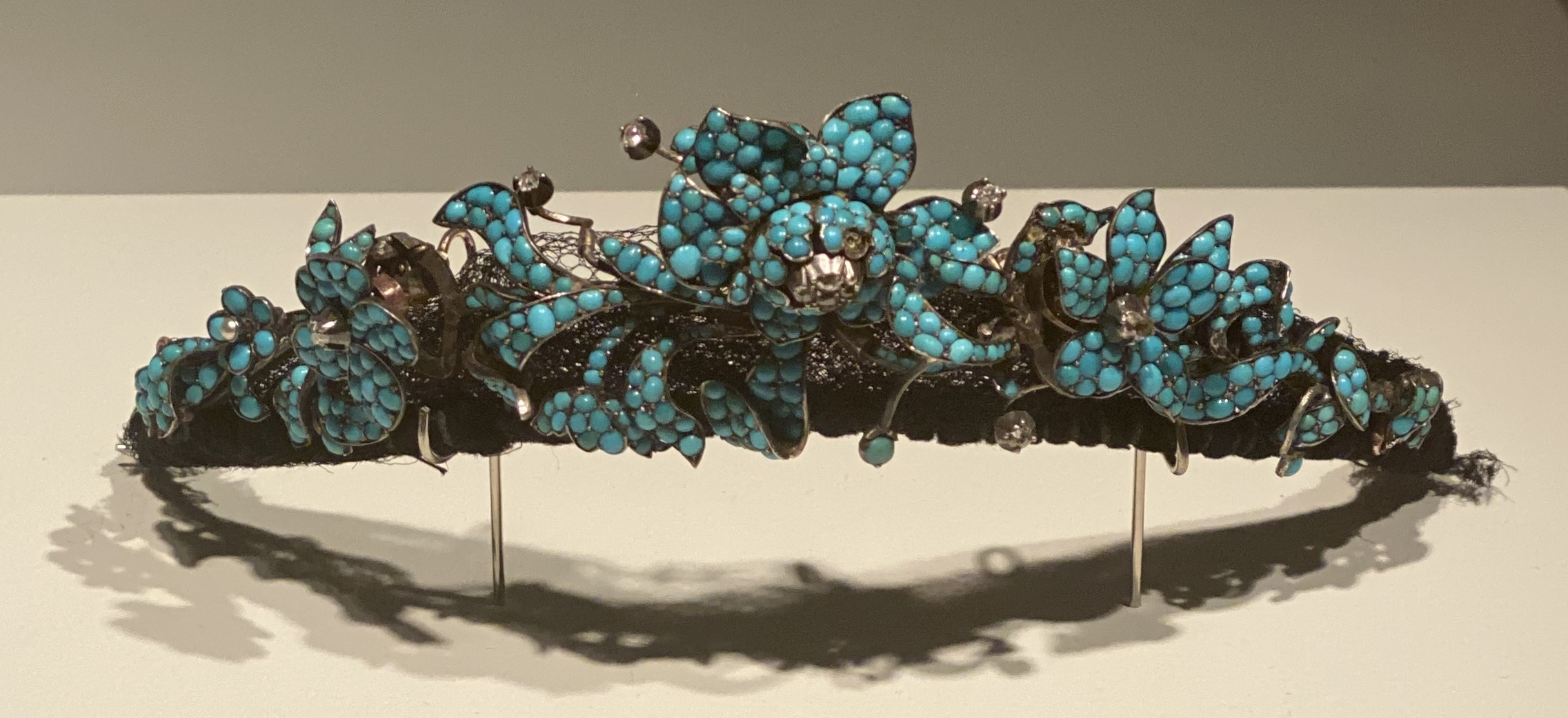
Turquoise tiara

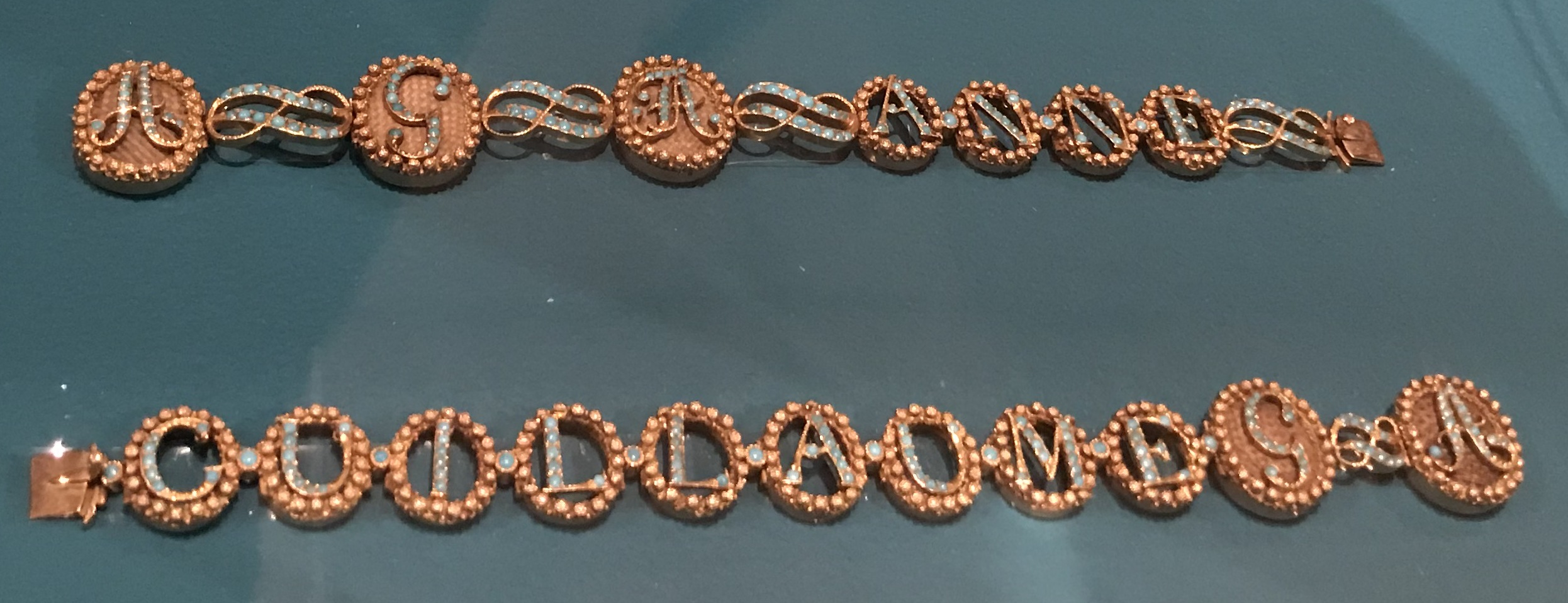
The pair of wedding bracelets for Guillaume and Anne

=== Gentlemen ===
Men's jewelry on show was either military awards, or functional objects such as watches and smoking paraphernalia.

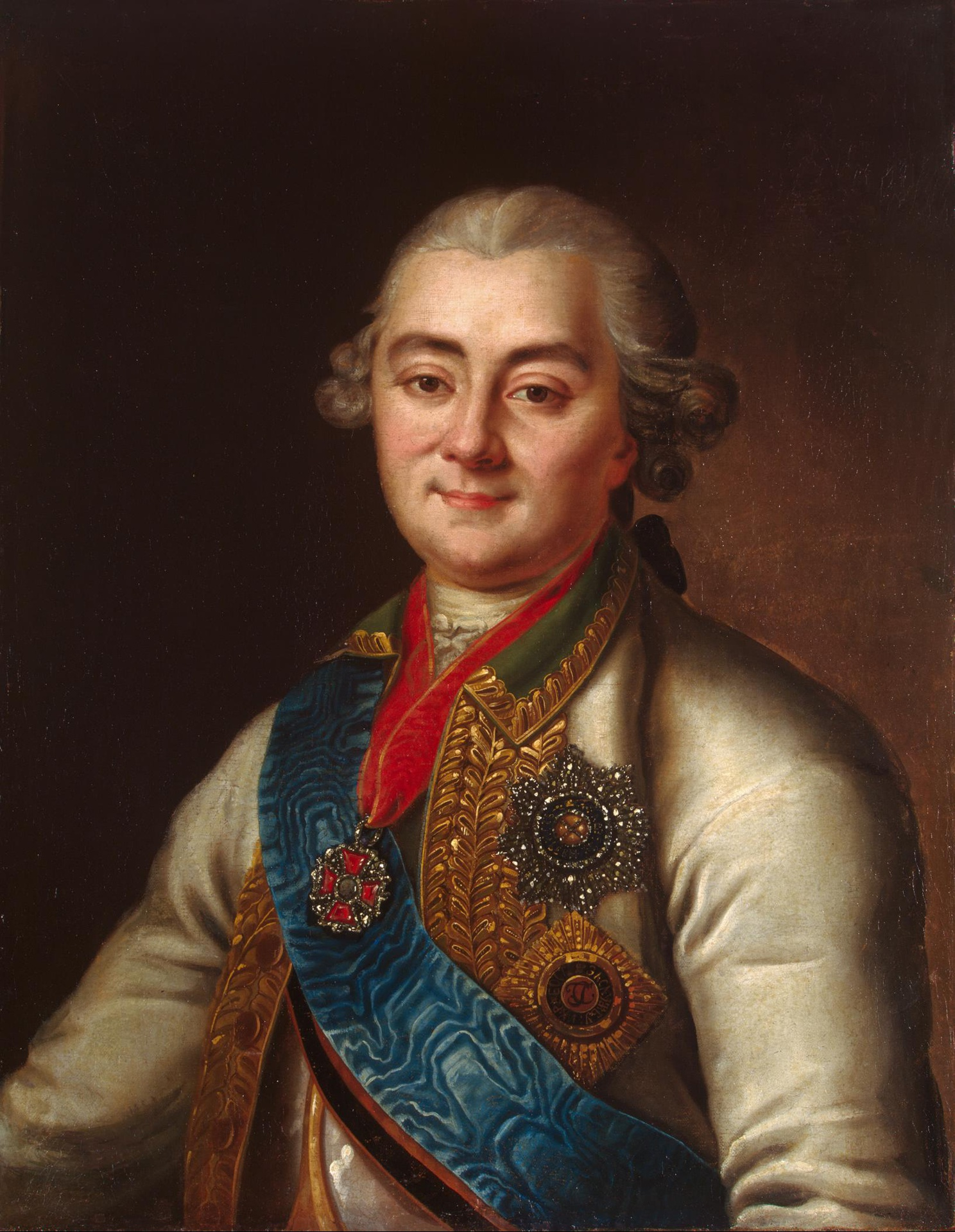
The military badge as jewelry

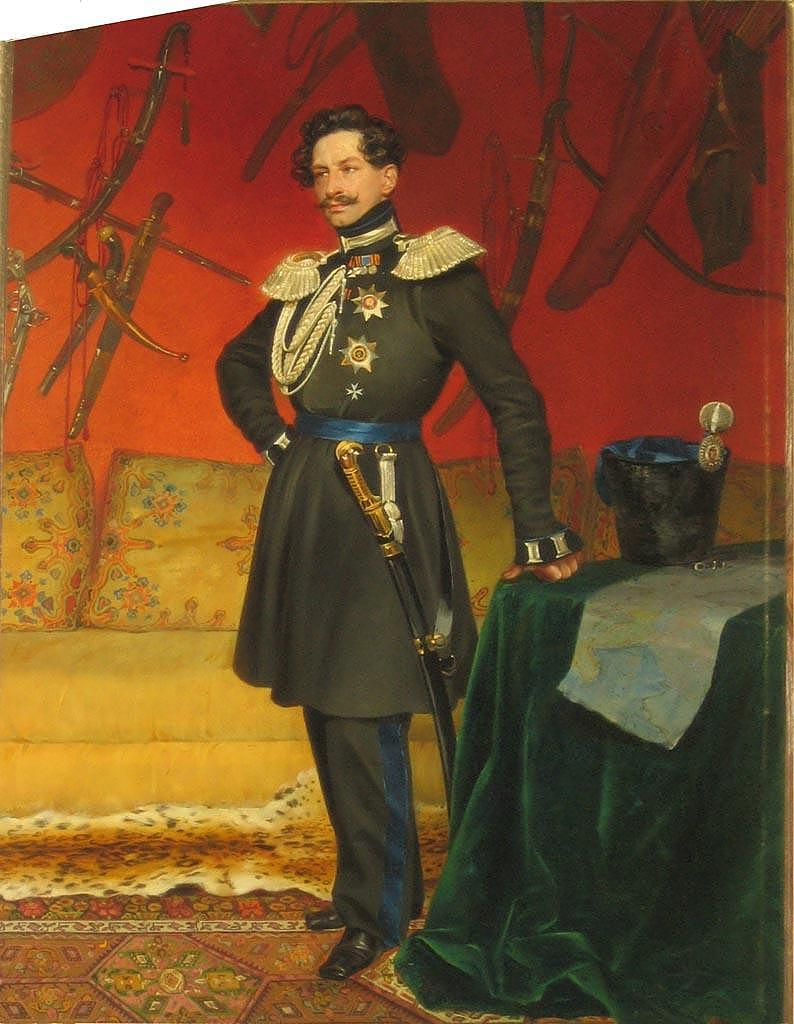
A general in dress uniform

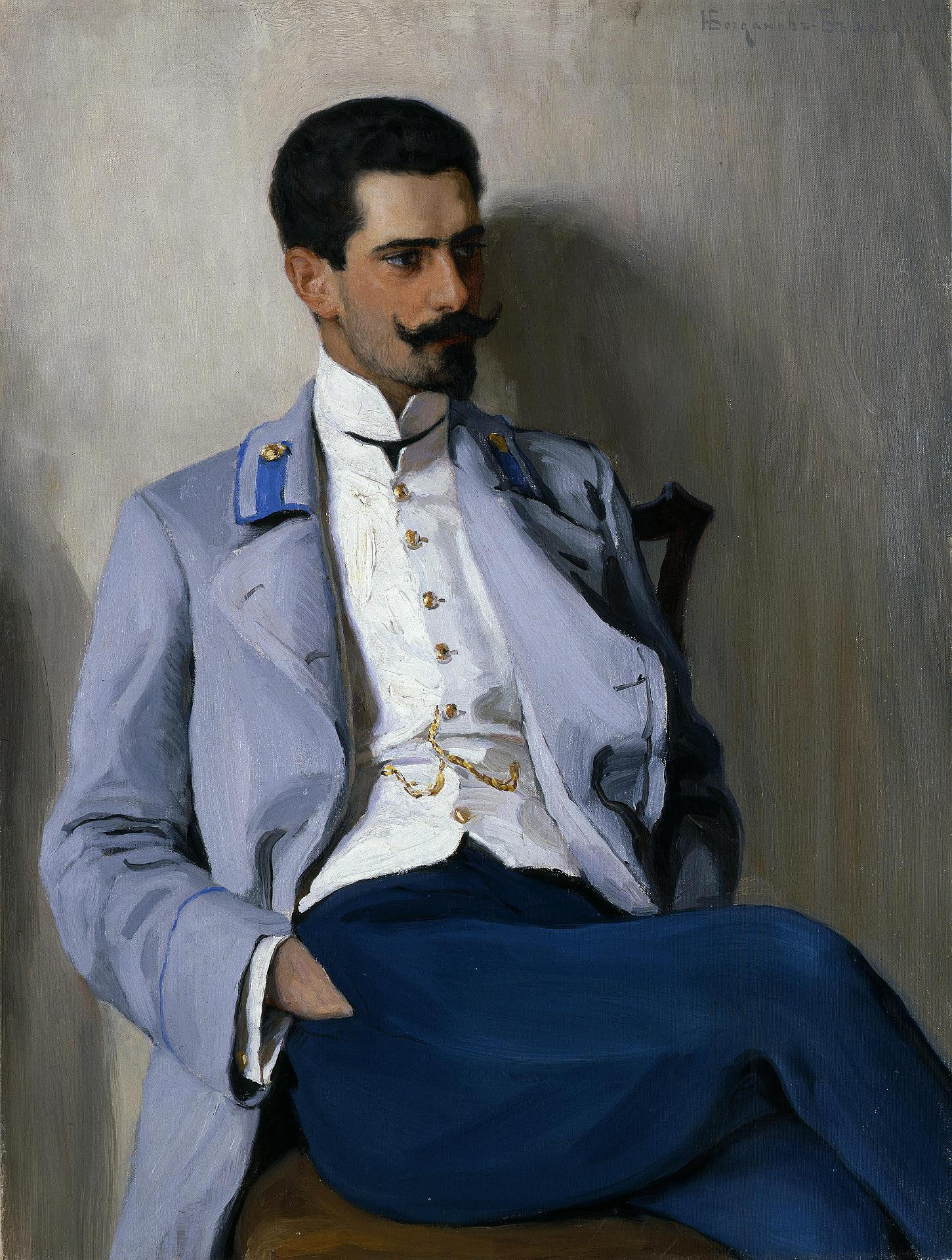
A dandy

=== Mourning ===
A remarkable tradition was wearing human hair of the deceased.

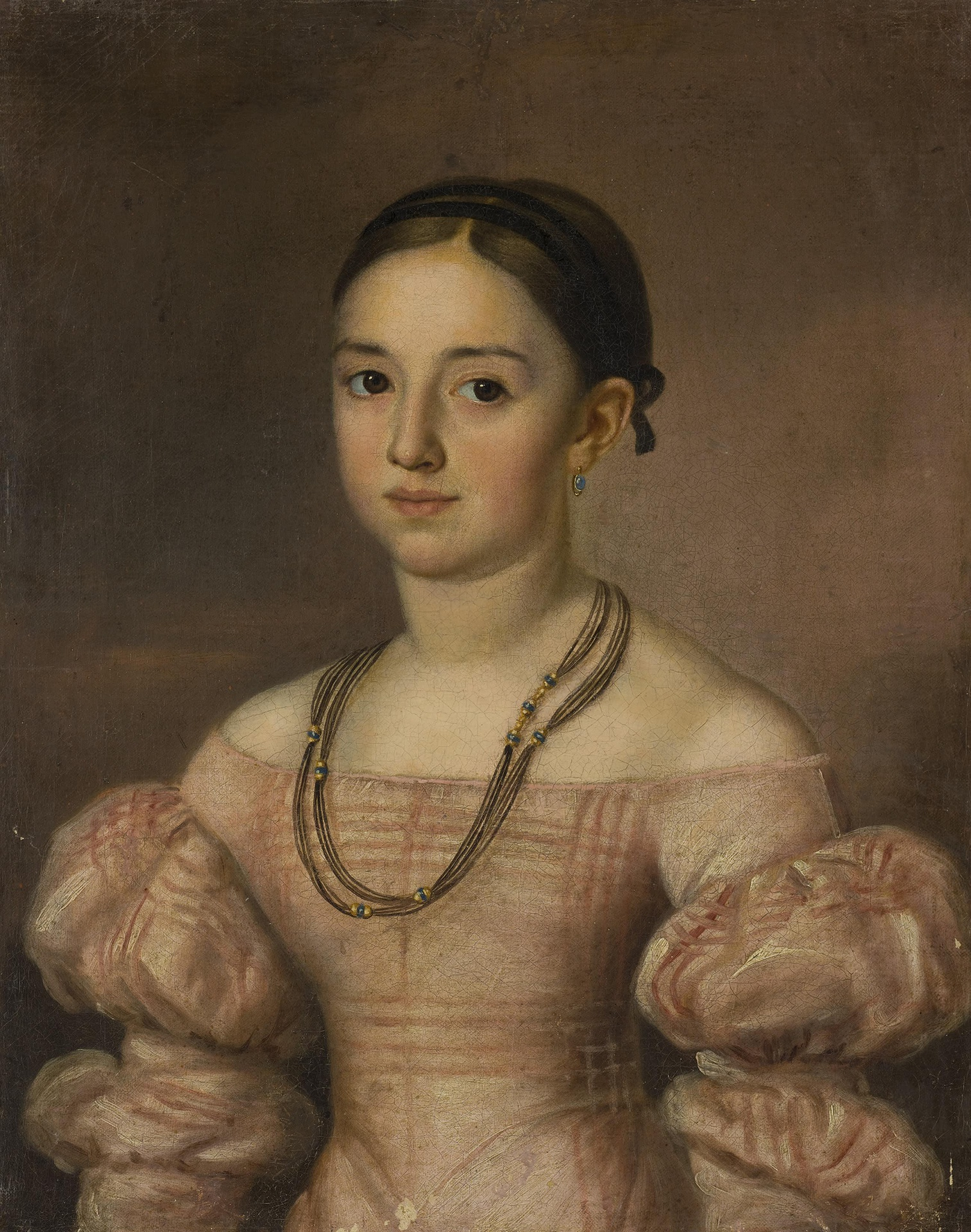
Portrait of a girl wearing a black headband and a necklace made of human hair.

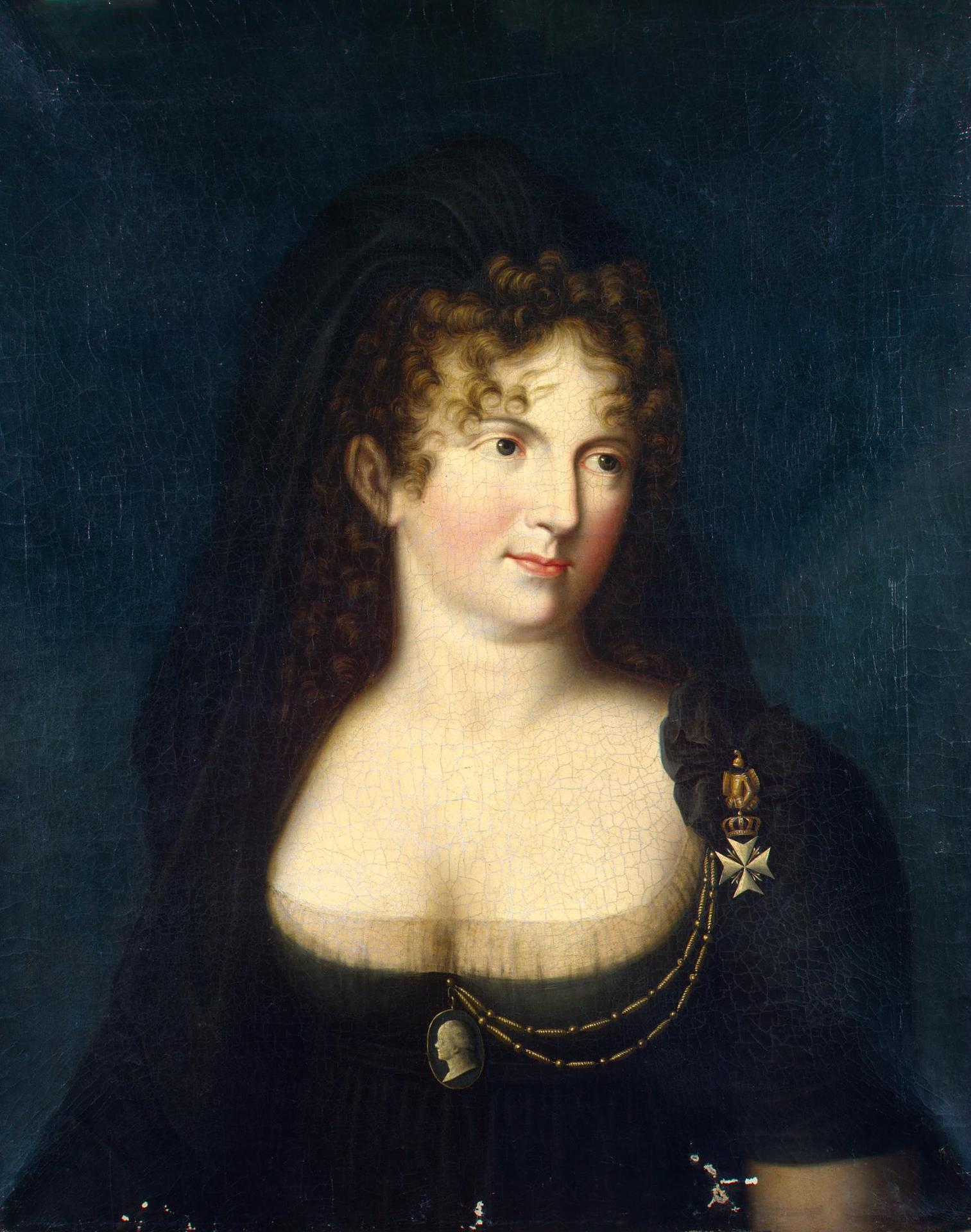
Maria Fedorovna in mourning, wearing a cameo of her late husband attached to his order of St. John of Jerusalem (he became grand-master in 1798)

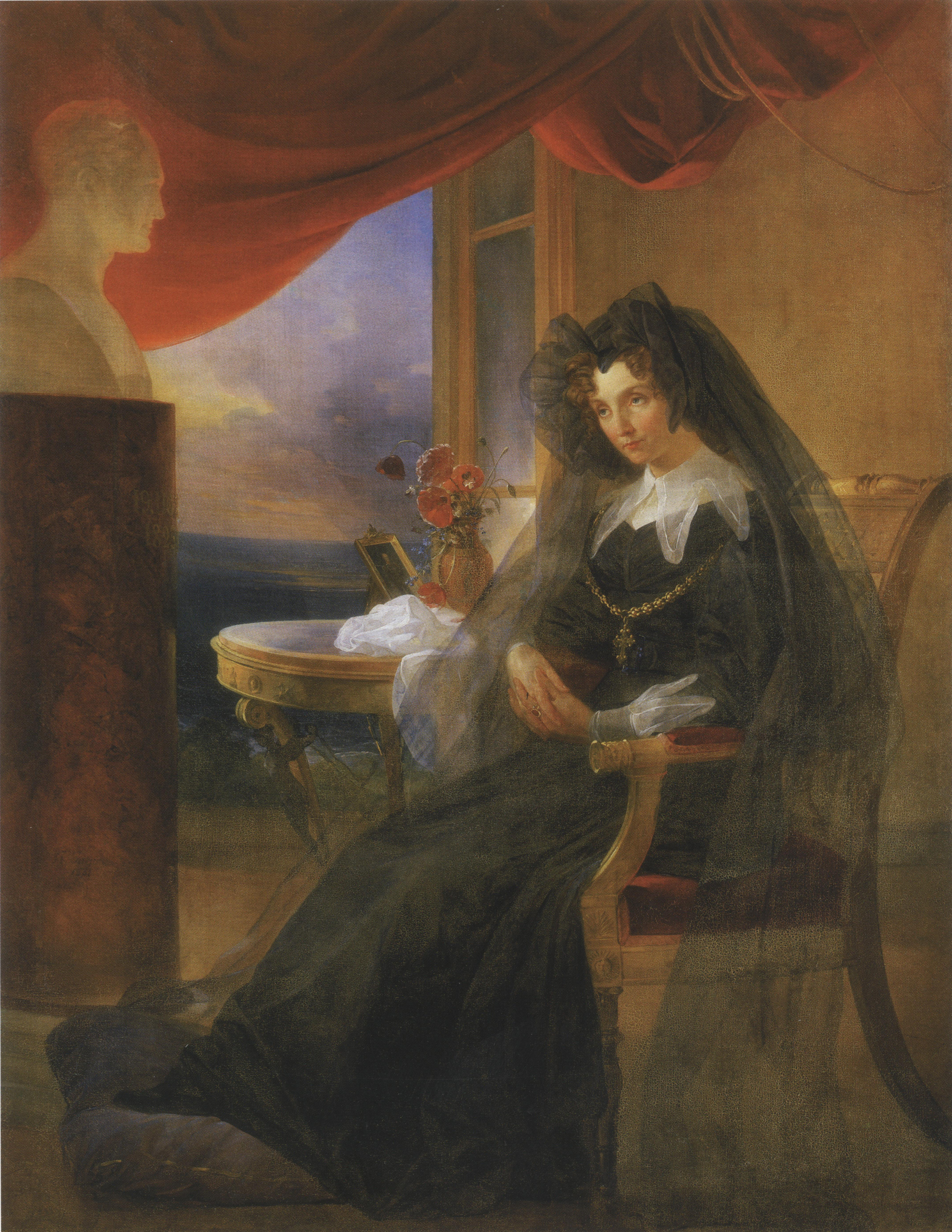
Elizabeth Alexeevna in mourning, seated next to a photo of her late husband

=== Fin-de-siècle ===
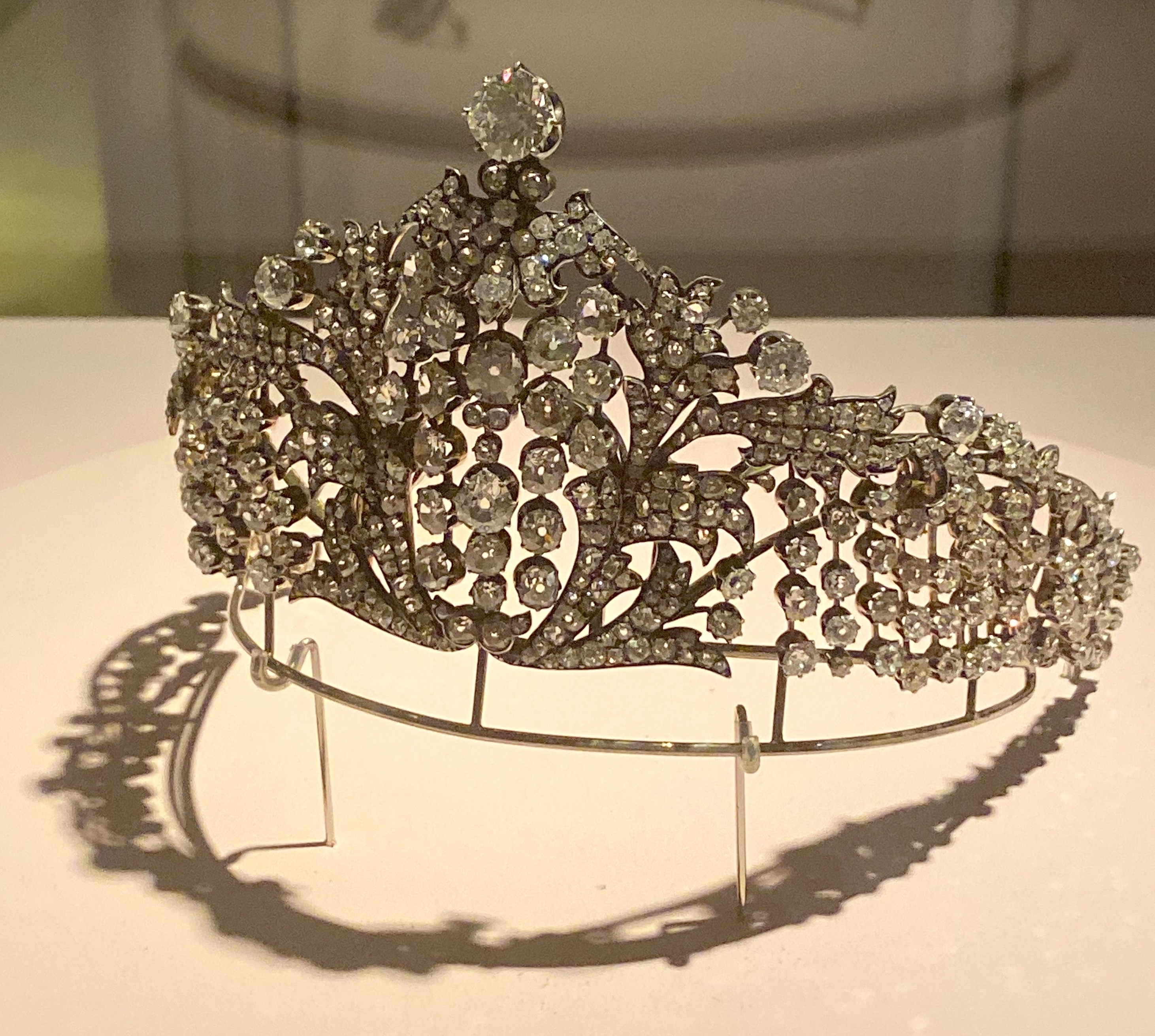
This spectacular Fabergé diadem was on loan from the Fabergé Museum

The main attraction of the Fin-de-siècle display room was the Fabergé diadem, that was placed on a rotating turntable to show how much it caught the light while the dangling parts moved.

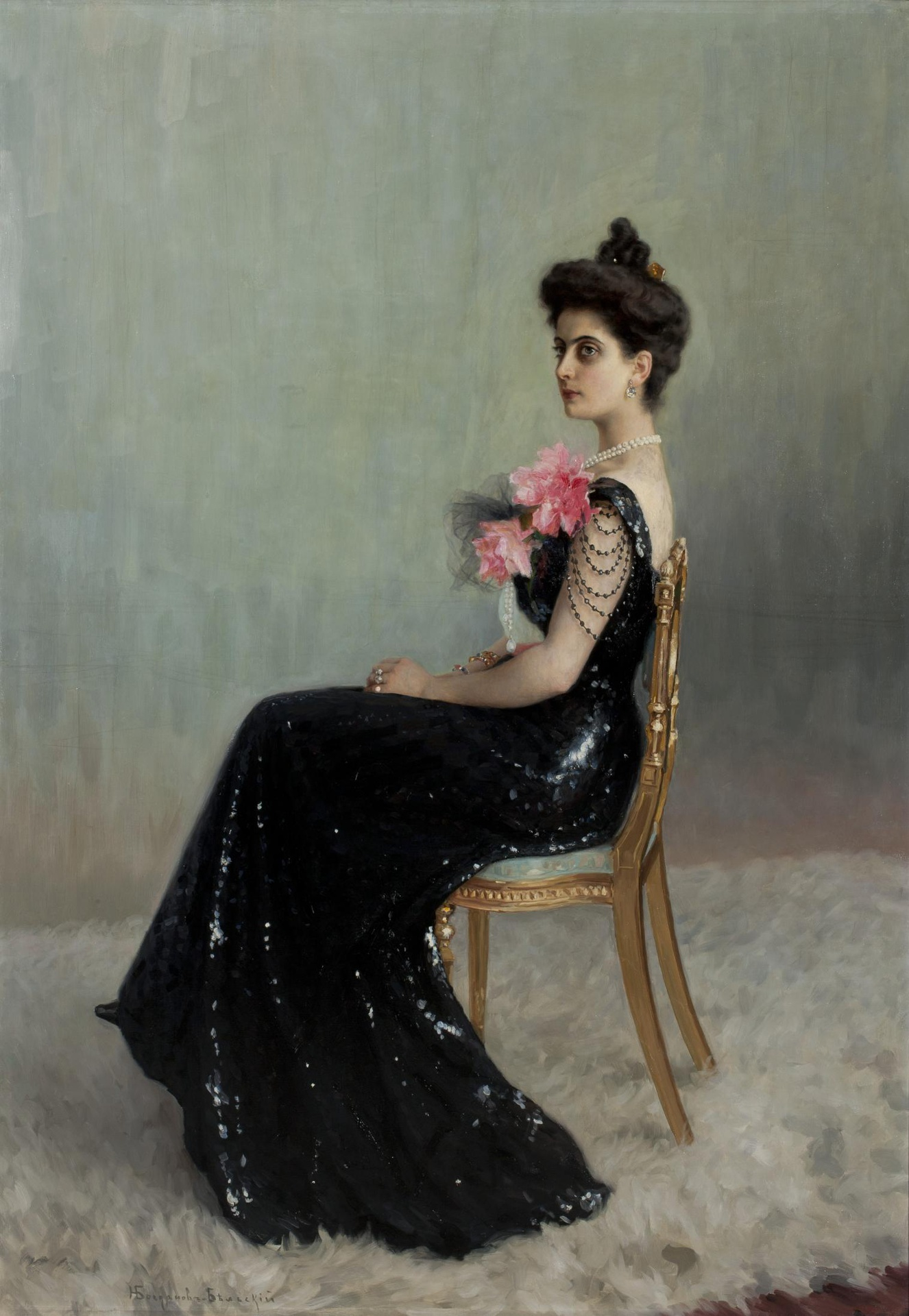
Portrait of Princess Maria Abamelek-Lazareva, née Demidova (1876-1955) in a sequin evening dress

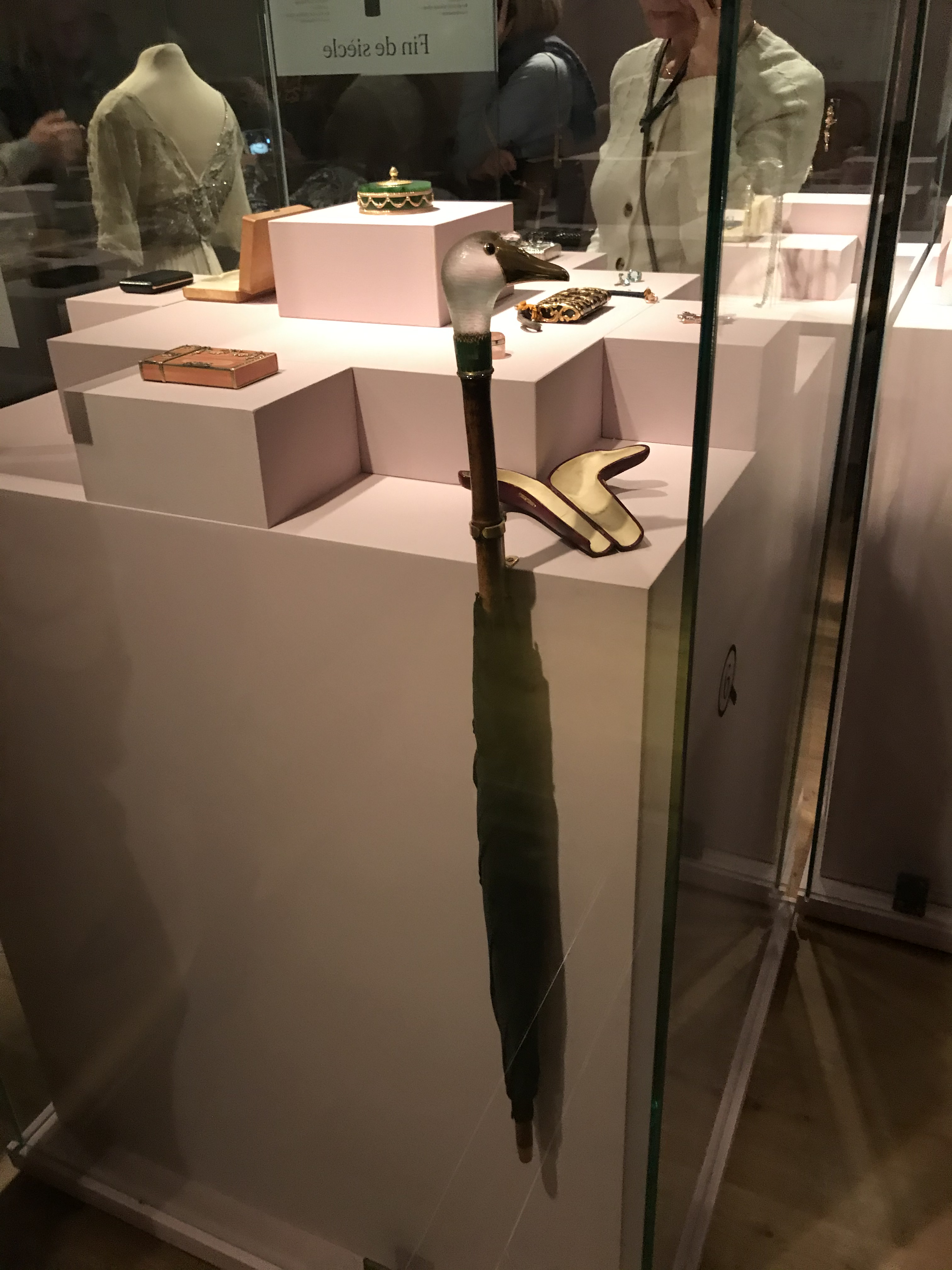
Overview display with Fabergé trinkets

== Ambassadors ==
Three Dutch fashion designers were ambassadors for this exhibition, who visited the Hermitage in Saint Petersburg and chose items there that inspired them and which they felt should be in the show. Their individual stories became part of the accompanying audiotour for the three items they selected, and one item by each was on show in the final room of the exhibition.

- Bibi van der Velden, a Dutch jewelry designer, was inspired by the show items by Russian court jewelers that display their craft in ways that explore material use as well as visual references. She selected a Neptune sculpture from circa 1600 that was placed on show in the "Treasury" room. She made a flamboyant double ring glittering with many of the gemstone types used in the original sculpture.
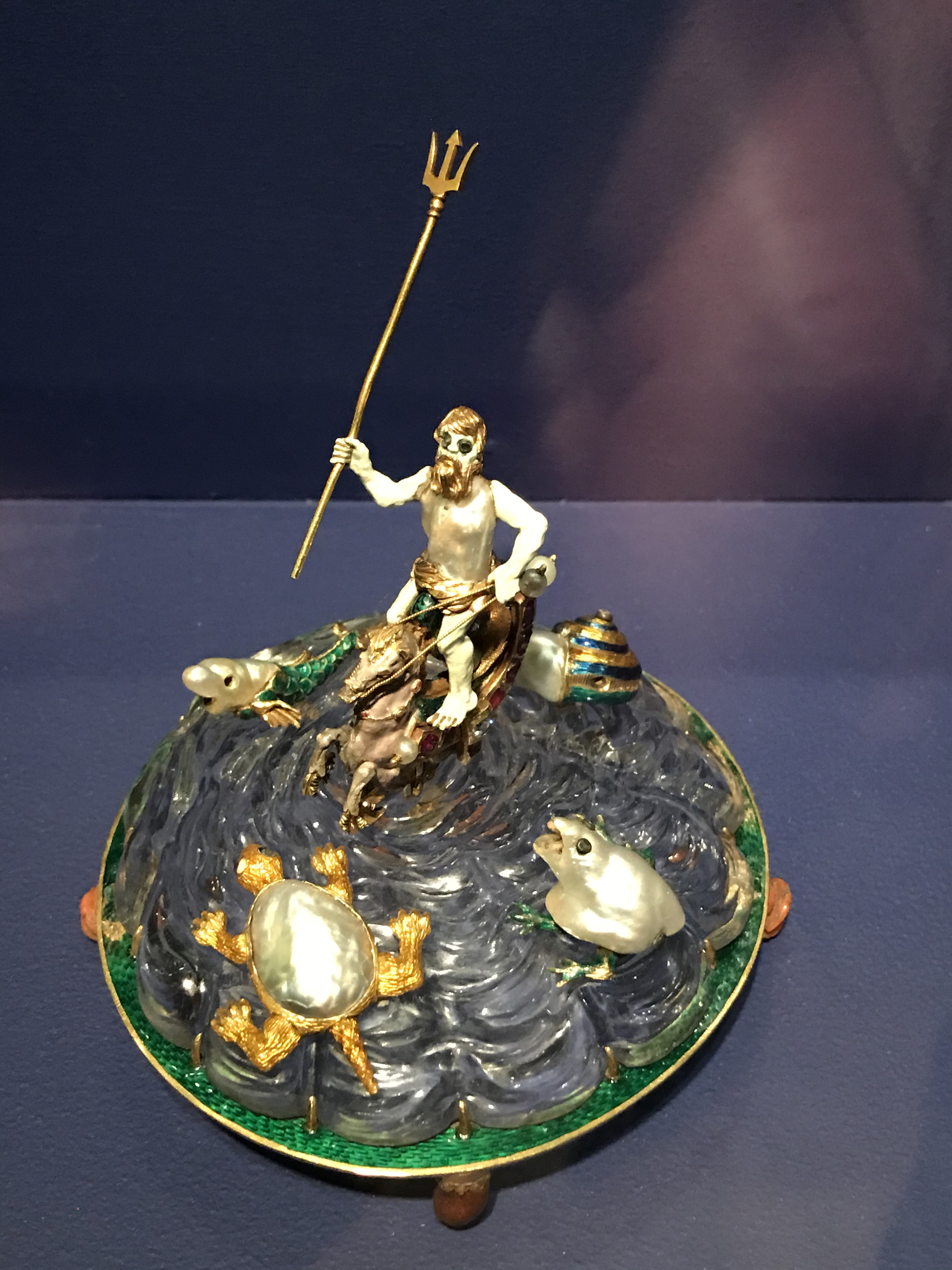
Statuette of Neptune Sitting on a Dragon
- Edwin Oudshoorn, a Dutch dress designer, was inspired by colors and deliberate marks of decay on a diamond-studded fin-de-siècle brooch in the form of a blooming orchid. He designed a dress using similar colors. It left the exhibition for one day because it was being worn.
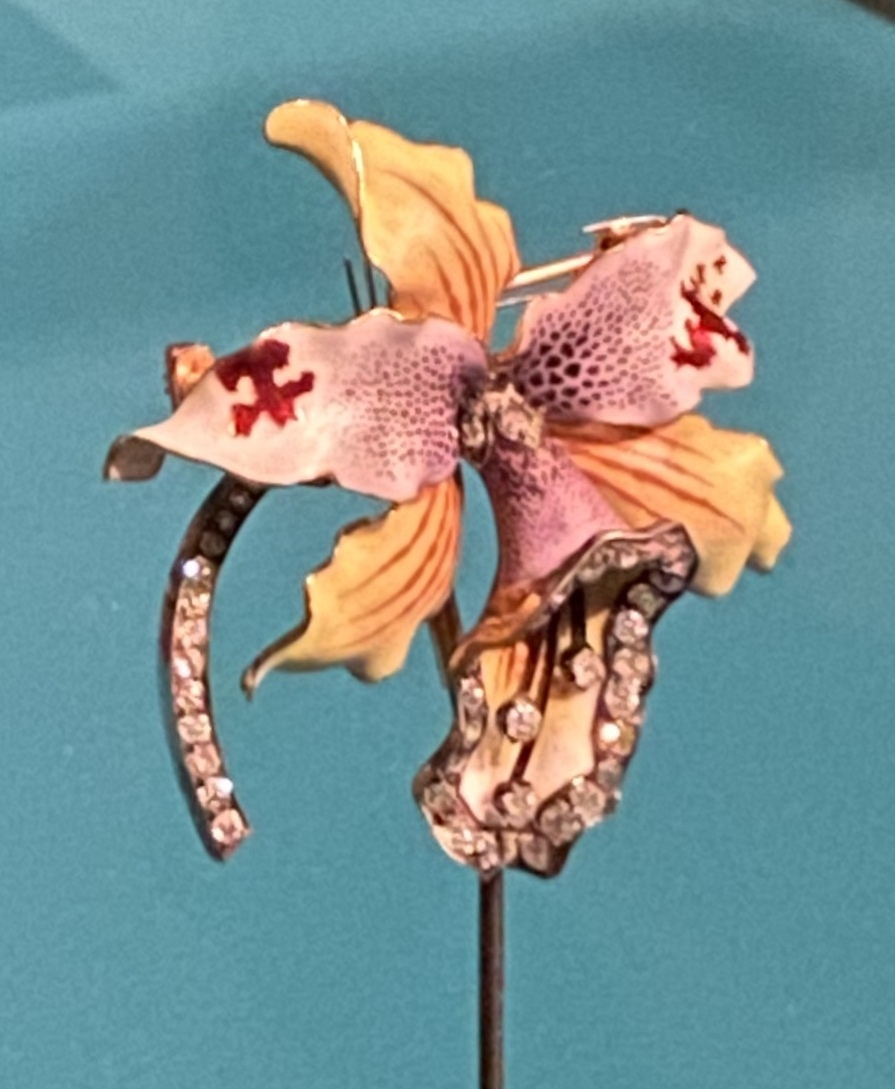
Orchid brooch
- Jan Taminiau, a Dutch dress designer, was inspired by a parure of gold filigree gems and papier-mâché cameos that had been a wedding gift to the older sister of Anna Paulowna, Grand Duchess Alexandra Pavlovna. Though made of gold and covered in diamonds, the main decoration of the parure is a set of cameos that were possibly made by the bride's mother in tandem with court jewelers. His "Mail bag jacket", one of his early creations worn by Queen Maxima of the Netherlands, was on loan for the show.
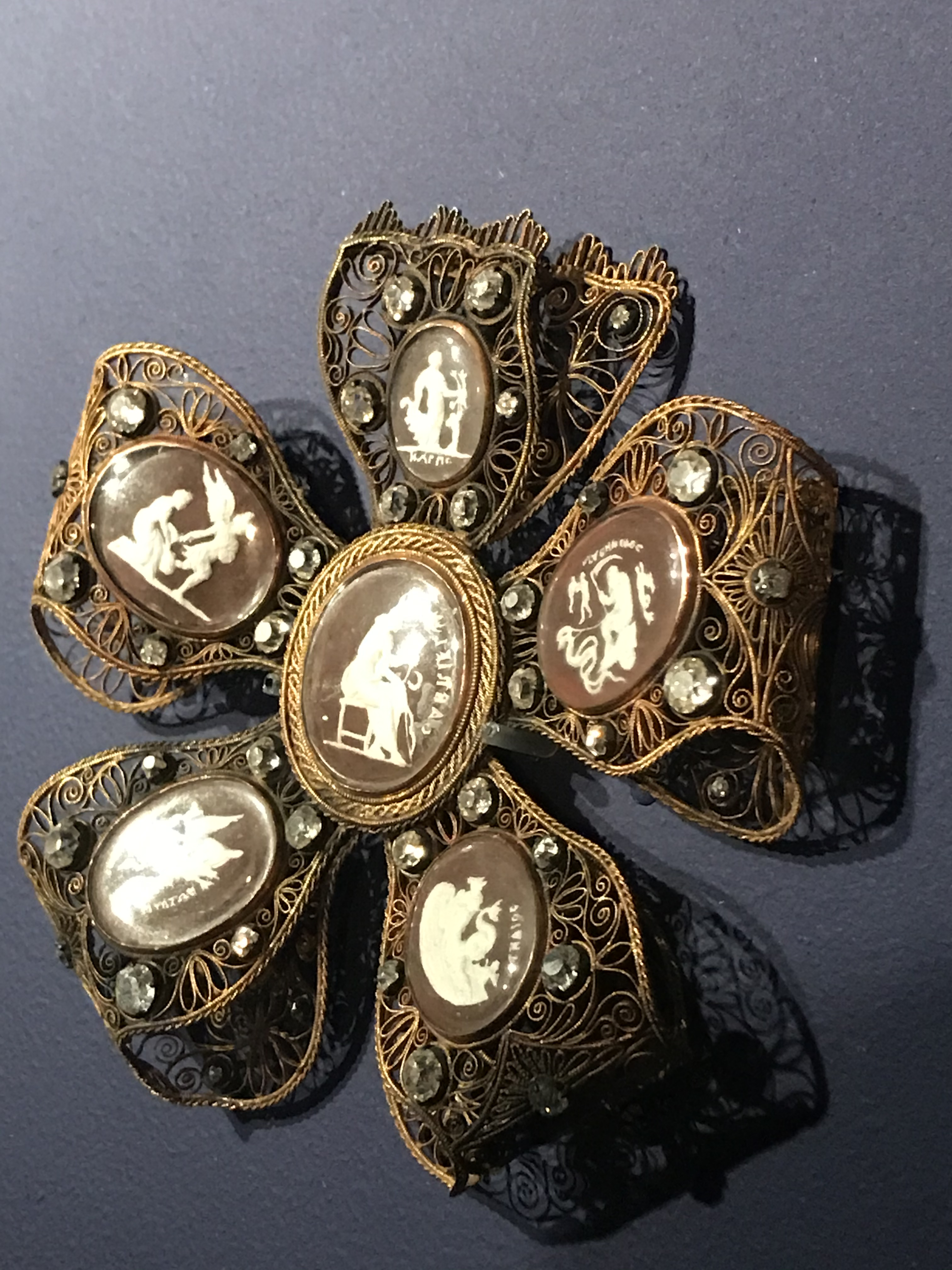
Bow, part of the parure of 1801
