= Cameron Shahbazi =

Persian-Canadian opera singer

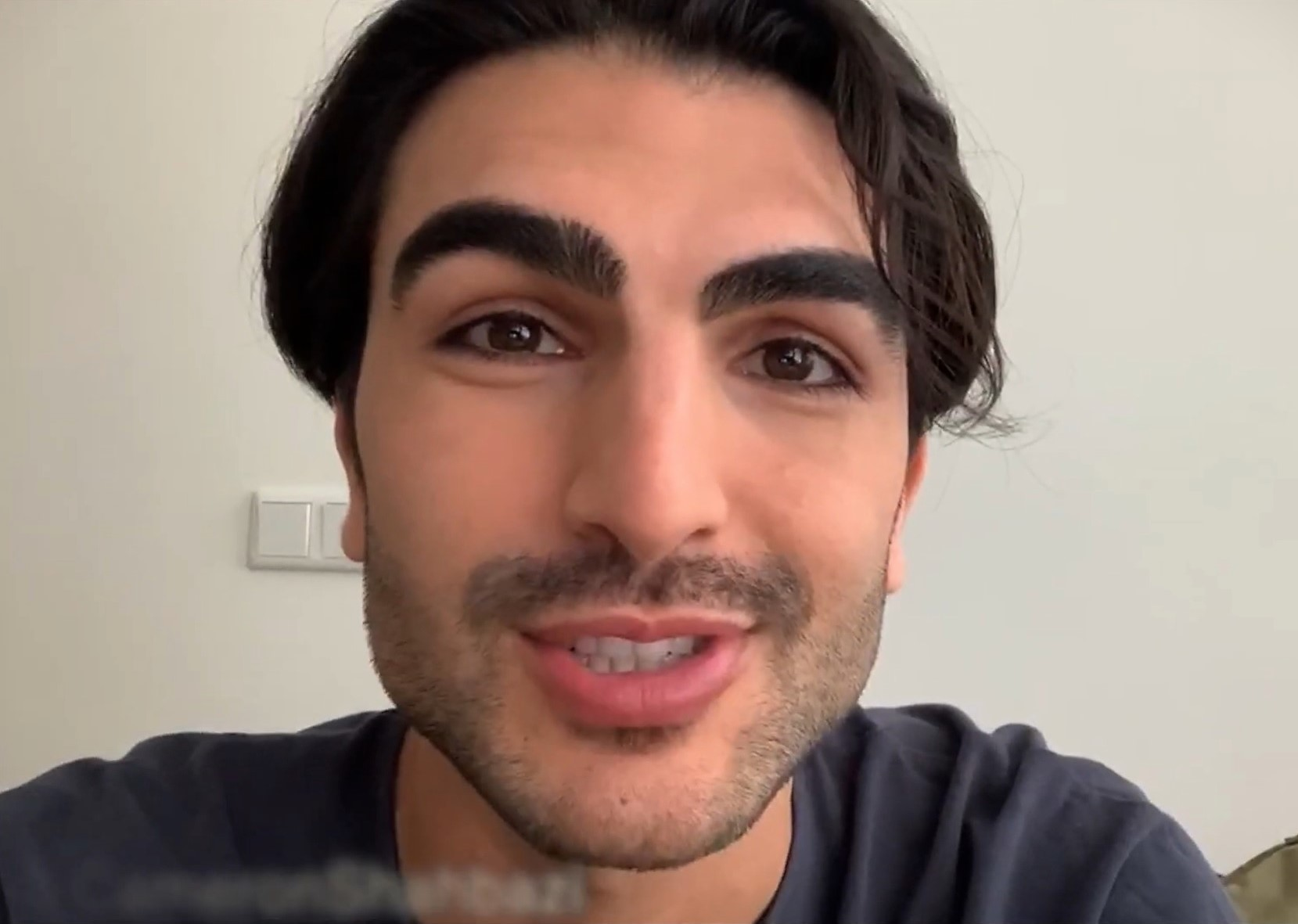
- Shahbazi in 2020
- Born: 3 April 1992; Hamilton, Ontario, Canada
- Education: University of Toronto; Conservatorium van Amsterdam
- Occupation: Operatic countertenor
- Awards: Kiri Te Kanawa Foundation Cover Award
- Website: www.cameronshahbazi.com

Cameron Shahbazi (Persian: کامران شهبازی; born 1992) is a Persian-Canadian operatic countertenor who has performed leading roles at opera houses and festivals in Europe, performing both Baroque and contemporary opera. He has sung the title role of Handel's Tolomeo at the Karlsruhe Handel Festival, Oberon in Britten's A Midsummer Night's Dream at the Oper Frankfurt, two roles in George Benjamin's Written on Skin, premiered in 2012, at the Cologne Opera, and in the world premiere of Ritratto by Willem Jeths at the Dutch National Opera in 2020. In 2023, he was awarded the prestigious Opus Klassik Award in the ‘Innovative Concert of the Year’ category for his brainchild entitled “Woman.Life.Freedom.”, a benefit concert at Oper Frankfurt produced in support of human rights in Iran.

== Career ==
Shahbazi was born in Hamilton, Ontario in 1992. He studied singing first at the University of Toronto. He made his stage debut in the title role of Francesco Cavalli's Giasone at the Hamilton Opera, a role he repeated at the San Diego Opera in 2017. Shahbazi studied further at the Conservatorium van Amsterdam with Sasja Hunnego, and was a member of the opera studio of the Dutch National Opera.

In 2017, he was awarded two prizes at the Troisième Concours Opéra Raymond Duffaut Jeunes Espoirs, an international competition for young singers managed by Opéra Grand Avignon. He appeared as a guest at Theater Aachen in 2018 in the title role of Handel's oratorio Il trionfo del Tempo e del Disinganno, in a staged production directed by Ludger Engels. A reviewer noted his charm and stage presence, as well as a broad spectrum of timbres. He received a Kiri Te Kanawa Foundation Cover Award in the 2019/20 season for his interpretation of the role of Narciso in Handel's Agrippina at the Royal Opera House in London. In 2020, he performed in the world premiere of Ritratto by Willem Jeths at the Dutch National Opera, in the role of Sergei Diaghilev. In December 2020, he appeared in two roles in a production of George Benjamin's Written on Skin at the Cologne Opera. A reviewer praised his performance as ranging from "angelic elegance to Luciferian charm", and described his voice as "iridescent". He was awarded the 2021 Walter Prystawski Prize of the Sylva Gelber Foundation.

In 2022, he appeared in the title role of Handel's Tolomeo at the Karlsruhe Handel Festival. At the Oper Frankfurt, he performed as Oberon in Britten's A Midsummer Night's Dream in 2022, staged at the Bockenheimer Depot by Brigitte Fassbaender. A reviewer described his voice as "mysteriously aloof sounding" ("der geheimnisvoll unnahbar klingenden Stimme") and noted that he and the Titania interpreted by Kateryna Kasper were "not of this world" ("nicht von dieser Welt"). In 2023, Shahbazi sang the role of Tolomeo in the Dutch National Opera's production of Giulio Cesare.
