= Marchesa (disambiguation) =

Marchesa is a hereditary title of nobility.

Marchesa may also refer to:

- Marchesa (brand), brand specializing in high end womenswear
- Marchesa Casati (painting), portrait painting of Luisa Casati by Augustus John

== See also ==
- Marchesana, a grape variety
- Marquesa (disambiguation)
