= Ritratto (opera) =

Opera by Willem Jeths

- Opera by Willem Jeths
- Librettist: Frank Siera
- Language: English, Italian, German
- Premiere: 12 March 2020 (video recording of dress rehearsal); 7 October 2020 (live premiere) Dutch National Opera

Ritratto is an opera in six scenes with music by Willem Jeths and a libretto by Frank Siera. The 2020 productions were conducted by Geoffrey Paterson and directed by Marcel Sijm, with costumes by Jan Taminiau. The Dutch National Opera commissioned the work. The opera was scheduled to premiere at the Opera Forward Festival in Amsterdam on March 21, 2020, but the premiere was cancelled because of lockdown measures in the Netherlands, due to the COVID-19 pandemic in the Netherlands.

== Plot ==
The opera describes the life story of an Italian high society icon at the time of the beginning of the First World War. The flamboyant wealthy heiress Luisa Casati stages herself as a living work of art and surrounds herself with leading artists of her time. When war breaks out, most of her friends, including her lover Gabriele D'Annunzio, become enthusiastic about the war. She distances herself from it in order to continue dedicating her life to art and ultimately sacrifices herself to her ideal.

== Roles ==
Roles, voice types, premiere casts
Role	Voice type	Video recording cast, 12 March 2020 Conductor: Geoffrey Paterson	Live premiere cast, 7 October 2020 Conductor: Geoffrey Paterson
Luisa Casati	soprano	Verity Wingate	Verity Wingate
Romaine Brooks	mezzo-soprano	Polly Leech	Polly Leech
Garbi	baritone	Martin Mkhize	Martin Mkhize
Gabriele D'Annunzio	tenor	Paride Cataldo	Paride Cataldo
Sergei Diaghilev	countertenor	Cameron Shahbazi	Gerben van der Werf
Man Ray	tenor	Lucas van Lierop	Lucas van Lierop
Jacob Epstein	baritone	Frederik Bergman	Frederik Bergman
Kees van Dongen	baritone	Dominic Kraemer	Dominic Kraemer
Filippo Tommaso Marinetti	bass-baritone	Sam Carl	Sam Carl

== Orchestration ==
The orchestral score of the opera includes the following instruments:

- clarinet in B♭, A and E♭
- bassoon
- Horn in F
- percussion (two players): glockenspiel, crotales (2 octaves), water gongs, Thai gongs, boobams, cymbals, large tamtam, tambourine, woodblock, Lion's roar, rattle, wooden box (with mallet), triangle, flexatone (high), snare drum, bass drum (with cymbal)
- harp
- piano
- string section: at least five first violins, five second violins, four violas, four celloss, two double basses
- Electronic sound effect in scene 2

== Recording ==
An audio recording of the March 12, 2020 dress rehearsal was released on Challenge Records on October 2, 2020.
