= Orpheus and Eurydice =

Ancient Greek legend

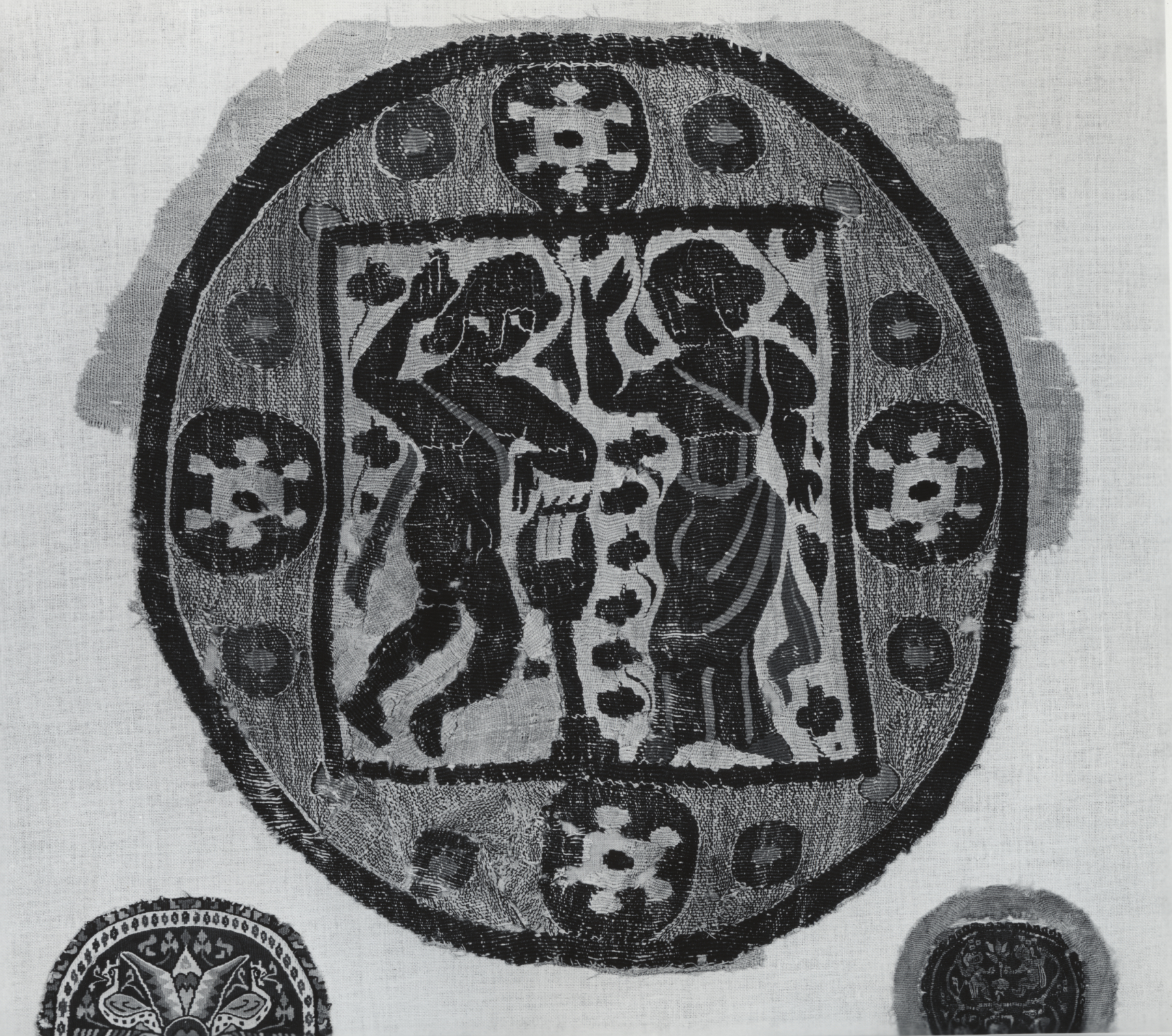
Egyptian tapestry roundel with depiction probably of Orpheus and Eurydice, 5th–6th century CE

In Greek mythology, the legend of Orpheus and Eurydice (Greek: Ὀρφεύς, Εὐρυδίκη, romanized: Orpheus, Eurydikē) concerns the tragic love of Orpheus of Thrace, located in northeastern Greece, for the beautiful Eurydice. Orpheus was the son of Oeagrus and the Muse Calliope, though in some myths he is considered the son of Apollo. The subject is among the most frequently retold of all Greek myths.

== Plot ==
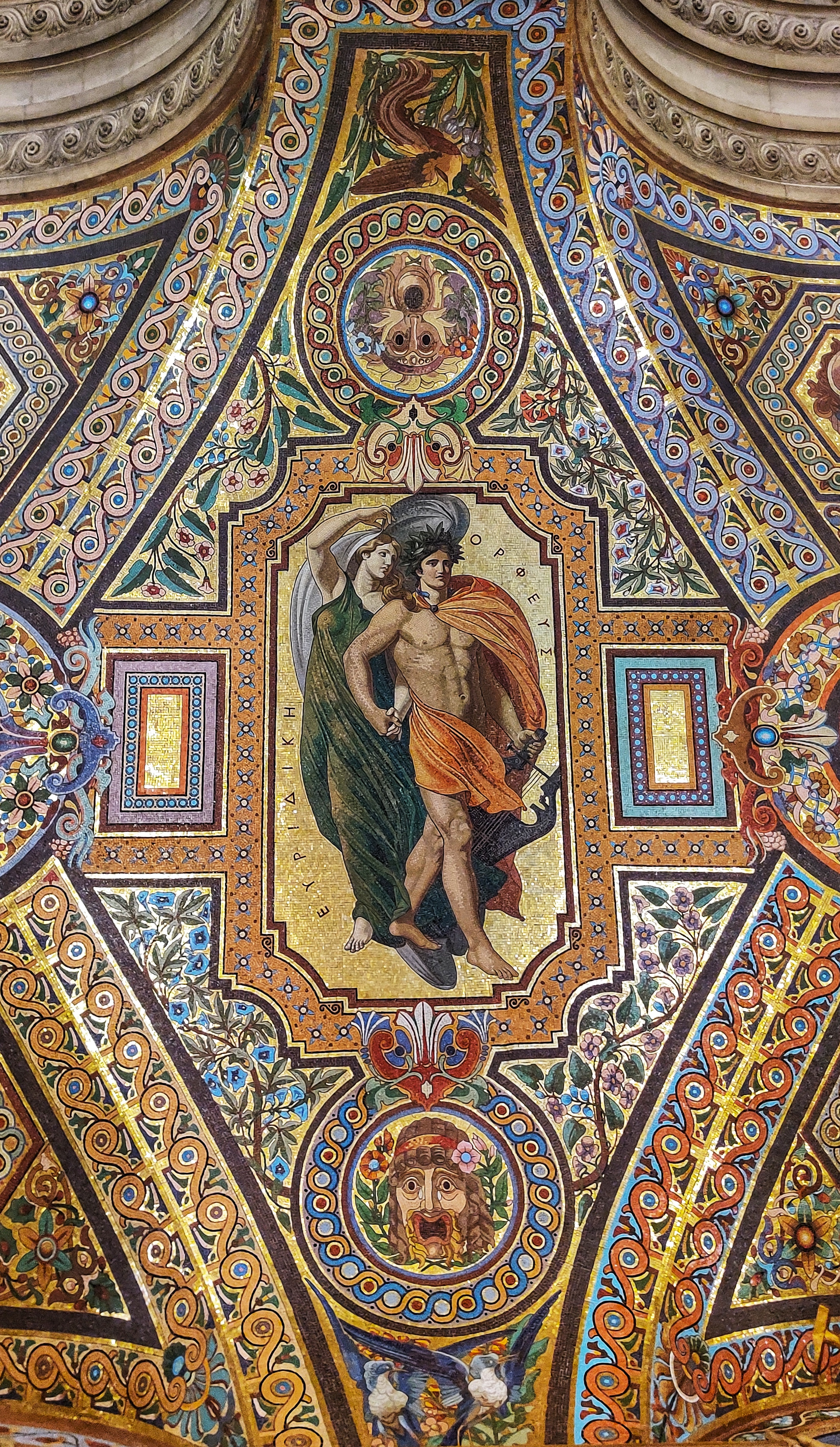
Orpheus and Eurydice in Palais Garnier, Paris. Their names are in Greek, ΟΡΦΕΥΣ (Orpheus) and ΕΥΡΙΔΙΚΗ (Eurydice).

Apollo gave Orpheus a lyre and taught him how to play. It had been said that "nothing could resist Orpheus's beautiful melodies, neither enemies nor beasts." Orpheus fell in love with Eurydice, a woman of beauty and grace, whom he married and lived with happily for a short time. However, when Hymen was called to bless the marriage, he predicted that their perfection was not meant to last.

A short time after this prophecy, Eurydice was wandering in the forest with the Nymphs. In some versions of the story, the shepherd Aristaeus saw her and, beguiled by her beauty, made advances towards her and began to chase her. Other versions of the story relate that Eurydice was merely dancing with the Nymphs. Whether fleeing or dancing, she was bitten by a snake and died instantly. Orpheus sang his grief with his lyre and managed to move everything, living or not, in the world; both humans and gods learnt about his sorrow and grief.

At some point, Orpheus decided to descend to Hades by music to see his wife. Any other mortal would have died, but Orpheus, being protected by the gods, went to Hades and arrived at the Stygian realm, passing by ghosts and souls of people unknown. He also managed to attract Cerberus, the three-headed dog, who had a liking for his music. He presented himself in front of the god of the Greek underworld, Hades, and his wife, Persephone.

Orpheus played with his lyre a song so heartbreaking that even Hades himself was moved to compassion. The god told Orpheus that he could take Eurydice back with him, but under two conditions: she would have to walk behind him while walking out from the caves of the underworld, and he could not turn to look at her as they walked.

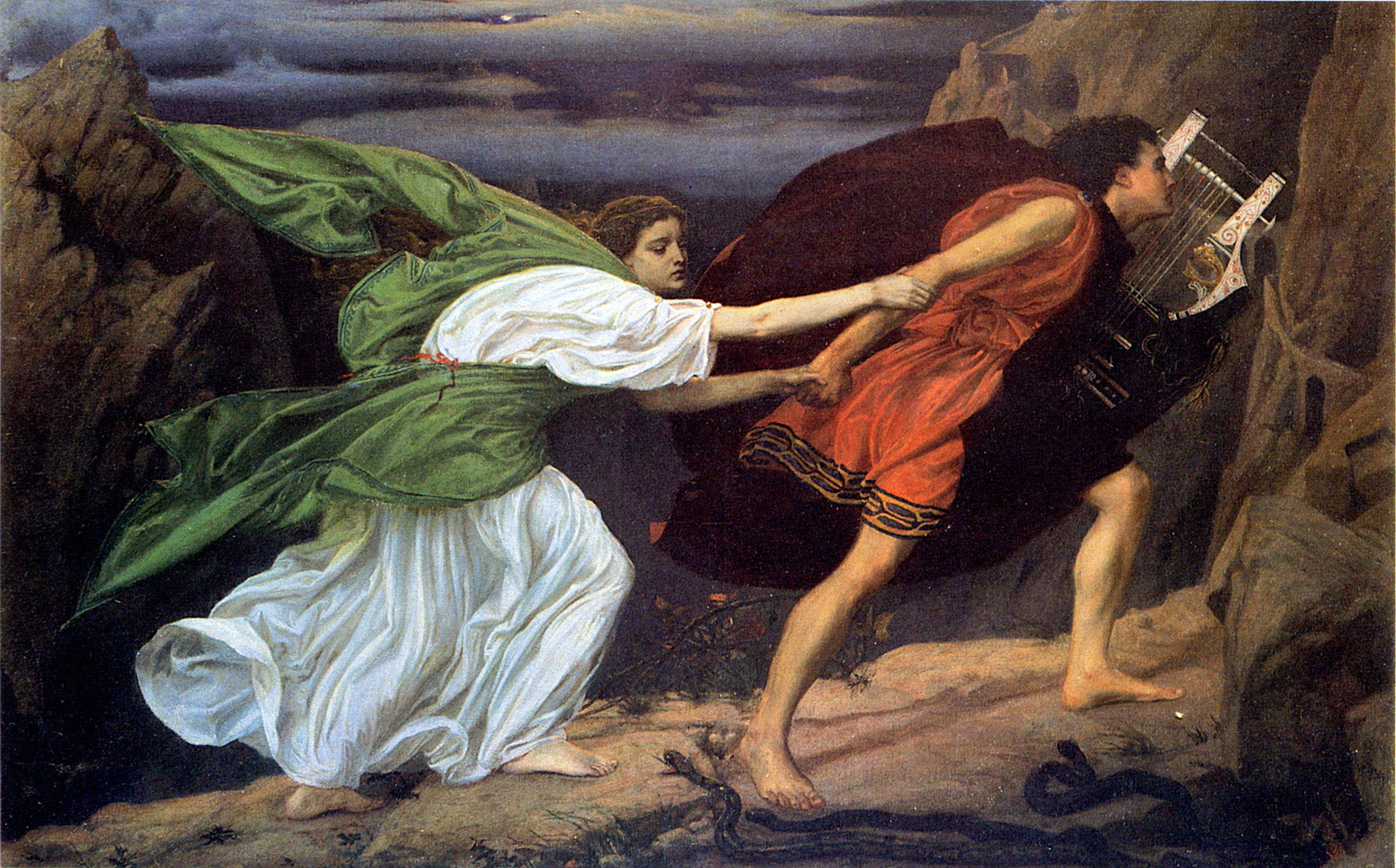
Edward Poynter's Orpheus and Eurydice

Thinking it a simple task for a patient man like himself, Orpheus was delighted; he thanked Hades and left to ascend back into the living world. Unable to hear Eurydice's footsteps, however, he began to fear the gods had fooled him. Eurydice might have been behind him, but as a shade, having to come back into the light to become a full woman again. Only a few feet away from the exit, Orpheus lost his faith and turned to see Eurydice behind him, sending her back to be trapped in Hades's reign forever.

Orpheus tried to return to the underworld but was unable to do so, possibly because a person cannot enter the realm of Hades twice while alive. According to various versions of the myth, he played a mourning song with his lyre, calling for death so that he could be united with Eurydice forever. He was killed either by beasts tearing him apart or by the Maenads in a frenzied mood. His head remained fully intact and still sang as it floated in the water before washing up on the island of Lesbos. According to another version, Zeus decided to strike him with lightning, knowing Orpheus might reveal the secrets of the underworld to humans. In this telling, the Muses decided to save his head and keep it among the living people to sing forever, enchanting everyone with his melodies. They additionally cast his lyre into the sky as a constellation.

== Versions ==
In Virgil's classic version of the legend, it completes his Georgics, a poem on the subject of agriculture. Here the name of Aristaeus, or Aristaios, the keeper of flying insects, and the tragic conclusion was first introduced.

Ovid's version of the myth, in his Metamorphoses, was published a few decades later and employs a different poetic emphasis and purpose. It relates that Eurydice's death was not caused by fleeing from Aristaeus, but rather by dancing with nymphs on her wedding day.

In the Bibliotheca by Pseudo-Apollodorus Eurydice is simply bitten by a serpent before dying and Orpheus goes to Hades to retrieve her.

Other ancient writers treated Orpheus's visit to the underworld more negatively. According to Phaedrus in Plato's Symposium, the infernal deities only "presented an apparition" of Eurydice to him. Plato's representation of Orpheus is in fact that of a coward; instead of choosing to die in order to be with his love, he mocked the deities in an attempt to visit Hades, to get her back alive. As his love was not "true"—meaning that he was not willing to die for it—he was punished by the deities, first by giving him only the apparition of his former wife in the underworld and then by having him killed by women.

== Retellings ==
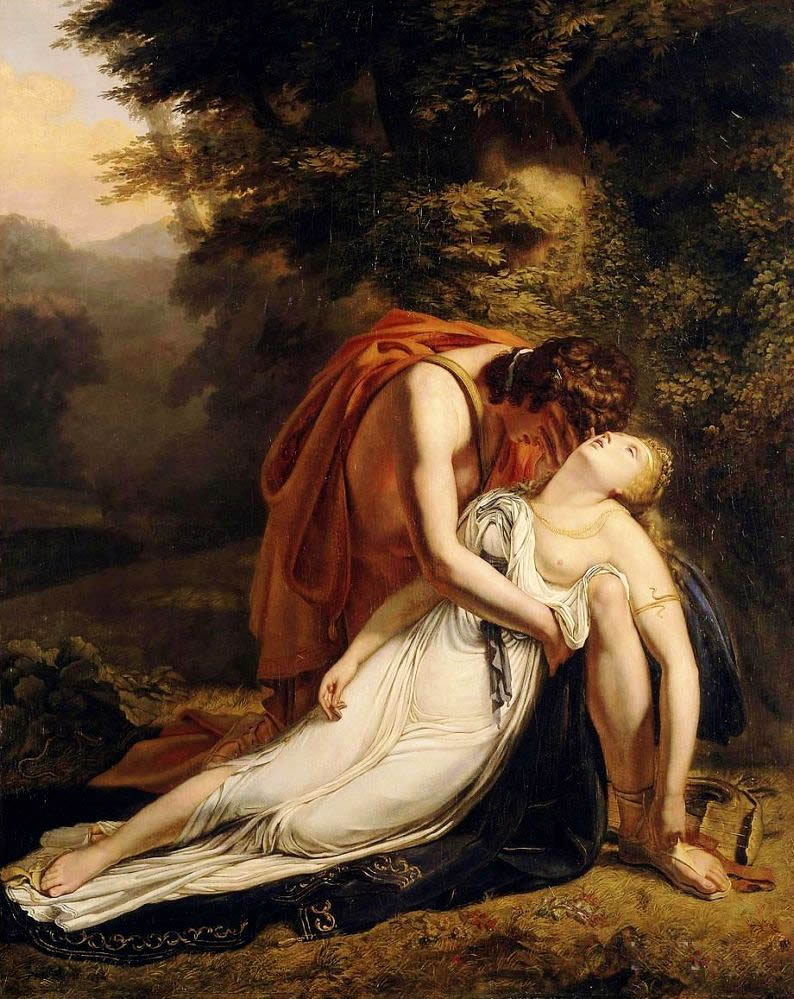
Orpheus Mourning the Death of Eurydice, 1814 painting by Ary Scheffer.

=== Literature ===
- The Death of Eurydice episode which occurs in Book IV of Georgics by Virgil (29 BC) and Book X of Metamorphoses by Ovid (8 AD)
- The poem "Orpheus and Eurydice" in The Consolation of Philosophy (Book III, Metrum 12) by Boethius (523 AD)
- Sir Orfeo, an anonymous narrative poem (c. late thirteenth or early fourteenth century)
- The Tale of Orpheus and Erudices his Quene, a poem by Robert Henryson (c.1470)
- "Orpheus. Eurydice. Hermes", a poem by Rainer Maria Rilke (1907)
- Sonnets to Orpheus, an allusive sonnet sequence by poet Rainer Maria Rilke (1922)
- Goat Song, a science fiction novelette by Poul Anderson (1972)
- The Song of Orpheus, part of volume 6 (Fables and Reflections) of The Sandman by Neil Gaiman (1990)
- The Ground Beneath Her Feet, novel by Salman Rushdie (1999)
- "Orpheus and Eurydice: A Lyric Sequence", a book-length lyric sequence by Gregory Orr (2001)
- Veniss Underground, a novel by Jeff Vandermeer (2003)
- "No Looking Back", a short story from "Tiny Deaths" by Robert Shearman (2007)
- "Hymn to Persephone", a poem by Craig Arnold in Made Flesh (2008)
- "Eurydice's Footnote", a 1995 poem by A. E. Stallings
- "Orpheus in the Underworld", a 2010 short story by Anthony Horowitz
- "A Song for Ella Grey", a 2014 novel by David Almond - also adapted for the stage in two different versions in 2017 and 2024 at Northern Stage
- "L'Esprit de L'Escalier" is a 2021 fantasy short story by Catherynne M. Valente, retelling the story of Orpheus and Eurydice in a modern setting.

=== Film, television and stage ===
- The Orphic Trilogy, a series of films by Jean Cocteau (1930–1959)
- Eurydice, a play by Jean Anouilh (1941)
- Orfeu da Conceição, a play by Vinicius de Moraes (1956)
- Black Orpheus, a film by Marcel Camus (1959)
- Orpheus in the Underworld (1974, DEFA, GDR)
- Evrydiki BA 2O37, a film directed by Nikos Nikolaidis (1975)
- Orpheus and Eurydice, a short film directed by Lesley Keene with animation based on Ancient Greek pottery (1984)
- Parking, a film by Jacques Demy (1985)
- Shredder Orpheus, a film by Robert McGinley (1989)
- An episode of The StoryTeller: Greek Myths (1990)
- Highway to Hell, a very, very loose adaptation film by Ate de Jong (1992).
- What Dreams May Come, a film by Vincent Ward (1998)
- Orfeu, film by Cacá Diegues (1999)
- Moulin Rouge!, a film by Baz Luhrmann (2001)
- Metamorphoses, play by Mary Zimmerman (2002)
- Eurydice, play by Sarah Ruhl (2003)
- Hadestown, folk opera by Anaïs Mitchell (2006)
- Orpheus and Eurydice: A Myth Underground, a theatre production written by Molly Davies with music by James Johnston, Nick Cave and the Bad Seeds for the National Youth Theatre at the Old Vic Tunnels, directed by James Dacre (2011)
- You Ain't Seen Nothin' Yet, a film by Alain Resnais (2012)
- Jasper in Deadland, a musical by Hunter Foster and Ryan Scott Oliver (2014)
- Life After Beth, a zombie romantic dramedy by Jeff Baena, the myth inspired Beth's means of death and Zach Orfman's hesitation in accepting her zombie reanimation as the real Beth (2014)
- The Book of Life, an animated fantasy film directed by Jorge R. Gutierrez, serves as a loose reinterpretation of the myth (2014)
- Hadestown, an expansion of the folk opera by Anaïs Mitchell, directed by Rachel Chavkin, that premiered at the New York Theatre Workshop in 2016 before eventually transferring to Broadway in 2019. (2017)
- Paris 05:59: Théo & Hugo, a French film (2016) by Olivier Ducastel and Jacques Martineau, queering the myth
- Moulin Rouge! (musical), a theatrical production based on the film by Baz Luhrmann
- Portrait of a Lady on Fire, a film by Céline Sciamma (2019) that uses the myth as a common thread
- La chimera, a 2023 film by Alice Rohrwacher with a fable-like quality, heavily based on this myth and mythology in general.
- Kaos (stylized as KAOS), a 2024 British mythological dark comedy television series created by Charlie Covell, includes an anachronistic reimagining of the myth as one of its major plots. The show is a Netflix original and aired for just one season.
- O'Dessa, a 2025 American post-apocalyptic musical drama film written and directed by Geremy Jasper, starring Sadie Sink, Kelvin Harrison Jr., Murray Bartlett, and Regina Hall.
- "The Song of Orpheus", the fifth episode of the second season of The Sandman written by Neil Gaiman, released on Netflix on 3 July 2025, in which Orpheus is re-imagined in the episode's setting of Ancient Greece.

=== Music and ballet ===
- Euridice, an opera by Jacopo Peri and Giulio Caccini with librettist Ottavio Rinuccini (1600)
- Euridice, an opera by Giulio Caccini with librettist Ottavio Rinuccini (1602)
- L'Orfeo, the first opera by Monteverdi (1607)
- Orfeo, an opera by Luigi Rossi (1647)
- Orpheus, an opera by Georg Philipp Telemann (1726)
- Orpheus and Euridice, an ode by William Hayes (1735)
- Orfeo ed Euridice, an opera by Christoph Willibald Gluck (1762) choreopraphed as a ballet by Pina Bausch (2005)
- Orfeo ed Euridice, an opera by Ferdinando Bertoni (1776)
- L'anima del filosofo, ossia Orfeo ed Euridice, on opera by Joseph Haydn with libretto by Carlo Francesco Badini (1791)
- Orpheus in the Underworld, an operetta by Jacques Offenbach (1858)
- Orpheus und Eurydike, an opera by Ernst Krenek (1926)
- Orpheus and Eurydice, a ballet choreographed by Dame Ninette de Valois with music by Gluck (1941)
- Orpheus, a ballet made by choreographer George Balanchine to music by Igor Stravinsky (1948)
- Orpheus in the Underworld, an album by Don Shirley (1956)
- Jazz Impressions of Black Orpheus by Vince Guaraldi Trio (1961)
- Orpheus, a song by New York Rock & Roll Ensemble, from Reflections (Manos Hatzidakis album) (1970)
- Orpheus and Eurydice, a rock opera album by Alexander Zhurbin (1975)
- The Mask of Orpheus, an opera by composer Harrison Birtwistle and librettist Peter Zinovieff (1986)
- Orpheus, a song by English singer-songwriter David Sylvian from the album Secrets of the Beehive (1987)
- Orpheus & Eurdice, a song cycle in two acts, by Ricky Ian Gordon (2001)
- Orpheus, a song by Ash (2004)
- Orfeo ed Euridice, an opera by Christoph Willibald Gluck (1762) choreopraphed as a ballet by Pina Bausch (2005)
- Metamorpheus, an orchestral album by former Genesis guitarist Steve Hackett (2005)
- Hadestown, an album of songs, and a stage musical, from the folk opera of the same name by Anaïs Mitchell (2010)
- Orpheus Alive, a ballet by Missy Mazzoli (2019)
- Eurydice, an opera by Matthew Aucoin with librettist Sarah Ruhl (2020)
- Orphee l'Amour Eurydice, opera created for the Dutch National Opera (2022)

=== Visual arts ===
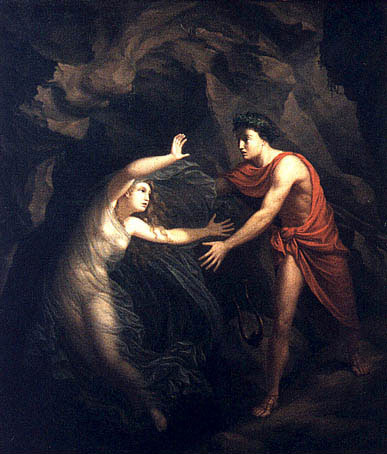
Orpheus glances back at Eurydice, 1806 oil painting by Christian Gottlieb Kratzenstein Stub.

- Orpheus and Eurydice, stone relief, second century, Šempeter, Slovenia
- Orpheus and Eurydice, a painting by Titian (c. 1508)
- Landscape with Orpheus and Eurydice, a painting by Poussin (1650–1653)
- Orpheus and Euridice, a painting by Federico Cervelli
- Orpheus Mourning the Death of Eurydice, a painting by Ary Scheffer (1814)
- Orpheus Leading Eurydice from the Underworld, a painting by Jean-Baptiste-Camille Corot (1861)
- Orpheus and Eurydice, a painting by Edward Poynter (1862)
- Orpheus and Euridice, a painting by Frederic Leighton (1864)
- Orpheus and Eurydice, a sculpture by Auguste Rodin (1893)
- Orpheus Searching Eurydice in the Underworld, a painting by the Antwerp school
- Portrait of Cosimo I de' Medici as Orpheus, a painting by Agnolo Bronzino (c. 1537-1539)

=== Video games ===
- Don't Look Back (2009), a Flash game and modern adaptation of the legend created by Terry Cavanagh, which follows a man who ventures into the underworld to guide the spirit of his deceased lover out of the caverns.
- Drakensang Online (2011) features a side quest in the Atlantis region concerning a human man named Orpheus who falls in love with an Atlantean woman named J'Ydike and falls into suicidal depression upon discovering that she has been petrified while in the process of mutating into a Gorgon.
- Hades (2020), an indie rogue-like game developed by Supergiant Games. The player, Zagreus, meets Eurydice and Orpheus, and is given the option of reuniting them.

== See also ==
- Izanagi and Izanami
