= Bibi van der Velden =

Bibi van der Velden is a Dutch jewellery designer and sculptor who uses unexpected materials and shapes in her creations. She is also the founder and creative director of Auverture, a contemporary jewellery platform.

== Early life ==
Born in New York, Van Der Velden grew up between The Netherlands and the English countryside. She is the daughter of Dutch sculptor Michèle Deiters.

== Education ==
Between 1998 and 2005 she trained in sculpture, first at the Florence Academy of Art (1998), the Gerrit Rietveld Academy in Amsterdam (1999) and finally at the Royal Academy of Art in The Hague (2000-2005).

== Career ==
In 2006 she launched her namesake brand Bibi van der Velden, Wearable Works of Art. Her designs feature materials such as prehistoric mammoth tusk, baroque pearls, and real scarab beetle wings. She works these elements together with sustainable gold, diamonds and precious stones, to create her designs inspired by animals and the natural world.

Shown at luxury exhibitions in London, Paris, Tokyo and Los Angeles and during fashion shows at Amsterdam International Fashion Week, Van Der Velden's jewellery can be found at stores such as Bergdorf Goodman, Dover Street Market, and Net-a-Porter.

In 2020, during the pandemic, Van Der Velden is noted in the New York Times for having enhanced sales of her jewellery through the use of technology and A.R. filters.

== Collaborations and exhibitions ==
In 2008 Van Der Velden presented the show 'Bedazzling Jewel' at the Museum of Antiquity in Leiden, and later that year also exhibited together with Dutch fashion designer Jan Taminiau. In 2010 she presented, together with mother Michèle Deiters, the exhibition 'Confronting Time'. In 2011 Van Der Velden became ambassador of the Solidaridad project ‘Op Weg naar Goed Goud’, for which she traveled through Colombia to collaborate with mineworkers to mine gold in a sustainable way. In 2019, Van Der Velden was part of the exhibition at the Hermitage Museum in Amsterdam, “Jewels! The Glitter of the Russian Court.” Inspired by the rich history of Russian jewellery and artifacts that were part of the exhibition, she created a unique one-off piece: The Memento Mori Ring.

== Publications ==
Van Der Velden's work has been featured in ‘Coveted: Art and Innovation in High Jewelry’ written by Melanie Grant and published by Phaidon.

== Philanthropy ==
In 2018 Van Der Velden founded Charlie Braveheart Foundation, following her daughter's diagnosis and recovery from Acute Lymphoblastic Leukemia. The foundation's goal is to make treatments for children in hospitals as pain and stress-free as possible, by sponsoring courses on ‘’comfort’’ care for medical and nursing professionals.
