= Brian Chapman (businessman) =

British businessman and director of Food Brands Group

- Known for: Founder of Food Brands Group and Percol coffee brand
- Children: Edward and Georgina Chapman

Brian Chapman is a British businessman and director of Food Brands Group, as well as the creator of the Percol coffee brand.

== Career ==
Chapman began working in advertising, but in 1970 he founded a company called Copack as a coffee distributor. In 1978, whilst teamed up with another company, they launched the coffee brand Verdona. They sold through supermarket chain Sainsbury's, and sold a million jars in the first week.

In 1987, he left and founded Food Brands Group on his own as well as the coffee brand Percol. In 1999, the company founded the charity Coffee Kids to support the coffee growing communities. In 2003, Percol became one of the first coffee brands to achieve Fairtrade certification, and by 2007 was worth £10 million. During the mid 2000s, Chapman compared the growth in consumer knowledge about coffee in the United Kingdom to the emergence in wine knowledge during the 1980s. Food Brands Group was acquired by Swedish-based Lofbergs Lila AB in 2013, by which time the company's turnover was £9 million a year.

== Personal life ==
Chapman has two children with Caroline Wonfor: Georgina Chapman, who is co-founder of the fashion brand Marchesa, and Edward, who is CEO of that company.
