= Lucas van Lierop =

Dutch-Canadian opera singer

- Born: 1988 (age 37–38); Hilversum, Netherlands
- Education: Schulich School of Music; Yale School of Music
- Occupation: tenor
- Website: www.lucasvanlierop.com

Lucas van Lierop (born 1988) is a Dutch-Canadian tenor based in Amsterdam.

== Career ==
Van Lierop was born in Hilversum, in 1988, and grew up in Vancouver, British Columbia. He began his professional vocal studies at the Schulich School of Music, under the instruction of baritone Sanford Sylvan. While at McGill University, he collaborated with musician Grimes, and Adam Scotti – the future official photographer of Justin Trudeau – on the recording of one of her first music videos, in an abandoned warehouse.

In 2012 he was invited to perform at the National Centre for the Performing Arts (China), with the newly establish iSing! young artist program. While in China he appeared on a popular China Central Television program, performing George Gershwin's "It Ain't Necessarily So" alongside American soprano Meghan Picerno and American Tenor Jamez McCorkle. In 2013 van Lierop performed with the Vancouver Opera on a tour of British Columbia's schools with an adaptation of The Barber of Seville, that takes place in Barkerville. Van Lierop continued his professional operatic studies in 2015, at the Yale School of Music, studying with Richard Cross (bass-baritone). In 2018 he made his European operatic debut in a double-bill of Leonard Bernstein's Trouble in Tahiti and James MacMillan's Clemency at the Dutch National Opera's Opera Forward Festival. The success of these productions resulted in his being offered a position in the newly created opera studio at the Dutch National Opera.

In 2017, he was a prize winner at the International Jeunes Ambassadeurs Lyriques competition, and at the Montreal Symphony Orchestra competition in Montreal, resulting in an invitation to perform at Helikon Opera in Moscow. During his tenure in the Dutch National Opera Studio, he covered the role of Joe Cannon in the European premiere of John Adams (composer)s Girls of the Golden West (opera), singing the final two performances. In 2020, he created the role of Man Ray in the world premiere of Ritratto by Willem Jeths, also at the Dutch National Opera. In December 2022, he created the role of Orphée in Orphee l'Amour Eurydice, in which he also played electric guitar. A review praised his performance as being "astounding. The depth of emotion portrayed, coupled with the sheer technicality required to master such a performance, was nothing short of amazing".

In addition to his operatic work, van Lierop has worked as a recitalist and a concert soloist, notably appearing with Helmuth Rilling at the Internationale Bachakademie Stuttgart, with Toshiyuki Shimada performing Carmina Burana (Orff) with the Yale Symphony Orchestra, and with Kent Nagano at the Concertgebouw, performing The Prince in The Snow Queen (Abrahamsen).

In February 2024 he made his Royal Concertgebouw Orchestra debut with the Amsterdam premiere of the "lost opera" Het pand der goden, by Suriname composer Johannes Helstone, as a last-minute replacement for another tenor, who was indisposed. Following this, in March 2024, he made his German Operatic debut in the role of Der junge Diener in Elektra (opera) at the Festspielhaus Baden-Baden, with the Berlin Philharmonic under the direction of Kirill Petrenko. In July 2024 he made his Austrian Operatic debut in the role of Diener 7 in Capriccio (opera) at the Salzburg Festival, with the Vienna Philharmonic under the direction of Christian Thielemann.

== Non-Operatic Performances ==
In 2021 van Lierop appeared on the premiere episode of Matthijs van Nieuwkerks television program Matthijs gaat door, where he performed a medley of David Bowie songs, alongside Laetitia Gerards and the Sven Hammond band. A YouTube clip of the performance has been viewed over 88 thousand times. In December 2022 he performed the duet The Prayer with Stefania (singer) in Symphonic Christmas: Fource & Friends, which was broadcast nationally on NPO Zapp. In August 2025, Lucas performed as a soloist alongside Karsu and Laetitia Gerards with Concertgebouw Orchestra Young during the opening concert of the SAIL Amsterdam music programme at the NDSM‑werf, conducted by Elim Chan.
