= Thomas Seedorf =

German musicologist

Thomas Seedorf (born 1960) is a German musicologist and university lecturer.

== Life ==
Born in Bremerhaven, Seedorf studied school music, Germanistics and literature at Leibniz University Hannover. He then studied musicology and pedagogy as well as singing at the Hochschule für Musik, Theater und Medien Hannover (doctorate: 1988 with a dissertation on the compositional Mozart reception in the early 20th century).

From 1988 to 2006, Seedorf was a research associate at the Musicology Seminar of the University of Freiburg. Since 2006, he has been Professor of musicology at the Institute for Musicology and Music Informatics at the University of Music Karlsruhe.

Seedorf researches primarily in the fields of music theory, music of the 20th century, Lied history and analysis, historically informed performance as well as in particular on the theory and history of bel canto.

Together with Michael Fichtenholz, he is artistic director of the Händel-Festspiele Karlsruhe as well as the Internationale Händel-Akademie.

Seedorf is also first chairman of the New Schubert Edition and co-editor of the Reger-Werkausgabe.

== Publications ==
- Studien zur kompositorischen Mozart-Rezeption im frühen 20. Jahrhundert. Laaber-Verlag, Laaber 1990, ISBN 3-89007-202-X (At the same time: Hannover, Hochschule für Musik und Theater, Diss., 1988).
- Heldensoprane. Die Stimmen der eroi in der italienischen Oper von Monteverdi bis Bellini. Wallstein, Göttingen 2015, ISBN 978-3-8353-1730-7.
