= Charles Fussell =

American classical composer

Charles Clement Fussell (born February 14, 1938, in Winston-Salem, North Carolina) is an American composer and conductor of contemporary classical music. He has composed six symphonies and three operas. His symphony Wilde for solo baritone and orchestra, based on the life of Oscar Wilde and premiered by the Newton Symphony Orchestra and the baritone Sanford Sylvan in 1990, was a finalist for the 1991 Pulitzer Prize for Music. He received a citation and award from the American Academy of Arts and Letters in 1992.

Fussell received advanced degrees in composition and conducting from the Eastman School of Music, where he studied with Thomas Canning and Bernard Rogers. He received a Fulbright grant to study at the Berlin Hochschule für Musik, where he worked with Boris Blacher. He also attended the Bayreuth masterclasses of Friedelind Wagner. In 1964 he received a Ford Foundation grant to be a composer-in-residence in the Newton, Massachusetts public school system. He was an assistant and close friend of the composer Virgil Thomson. He served as the president of the Thomson Foundation for many years.

Fussell has served on the faculty of the University of Massachusetts at Amherst, the North Carolina School of the Arts (1976–1977), Boston University (1983–2003), and Rutgers University.

== Catalogue of works ==
Late 1950s

- Essay for Orchestra
- Variations for Orchestra
- Six Dances for Orchestra

1962

- Caligula, opera based on a play by Albert Camus
- Trio, for violin, cello, and piano

1963

- Dance Suite, for flute, trumpet, viola, and two percussionists
- Symphony in One Movement [No. I], for large orchestra

1964

- Sweelinck Liedvariationen Mein Junges Leben, for solo string trio, marimba, mandolin, harp, and small orchestra
- Saint Stephen and Herod, drama for speaker, chorus, and winds

1965

- Poems for Chamber Orchestra and Voices after Hart Crane, text by Hart Crane
- Three Choral Pieces (rev. 1975), for chorus and piano
  1. Fancy's Knell (SA and piano)
  2. Three Epitaphs (TB and piano)
  3. I Saw a Peacock (mixed chorus and piano)

1967

- Symphony No. II, for soprano and large orchestra

1968

- Two Ballades (rev. 1976), for cello and piano
- The Blessed Virgin's Expostulation, realization after Henry Purcell for soprano and ten instruments

1970

- Voyages, for soprano and tenor soloists, female chorus, piano, and solo wind instrument plus recorded speaker. Text by Hart Crane.

1971

- Julian, drama in five scenes after the tale of Gustave Flaubert

1973

- Three Processionals for Orchestra

1975

- Eurydice, for soprano, flute, clarinet, violin, cello, and piano, with obligato trumpet, horn, trombone, and bass-drum

1976

- Résumé, cycle of nine songs for soprano, clarinet, string bass, and piano. Text by Dorothy Parker.
- Greenwood Sketches, Music for String Quartet
- A Prophecy, for chorus and piano. Text by Allen Ginsberg.

1977

- Etudes and Portraits, for solo organ

1979

- Northern Lights, two portraits for chamber orchestra
  1. Leós Janacek, for two flutes, four solo violins, timpani, and strings
  2. Edvard Munch, for two flutes, string quartet, timpani, and string orchestra
- A Joyful Fugue, transcription for band of an orchestral score by Virgil Thomson

1981

- Landscapes, Symphony No. III, for chorus and large orchestra
  1. A Prophecy (Allen Ginsberg)
  2. A Night Battle (Walt Whitman)
  3. Moment Fugue 1929 (Hart Crane)
  4. Landscape (Alberta Phillips)
- Four Fairy Tales After Oscar Wilde, for orchestra
  1. The Young King
  2. The Nightingale and the Rose
  3. The Happy Prince
    A. Prelude
    B. Romance of the Sparrow and Reed
    C. Coda
  4. The Remarkable Rocket

1982

- Overture to Paul Bunyan, transcription for band of an orchestral score by Benjamin Britten

1983

- Song of Return, for SATB chorus with piano. Text by W. H. Auden.

1985

- Cymbeline, drama after Shakespeare for soprano and tenor soli, narrator, plus chamber ensemble (11 players)

1986

- The Gift, for SATB chorus with soprano solo. Text by William Carlos Williams.
- Three Portraits for Chamber Orchestra
  1. Virgil Thomson (1981)
    Version for solo piano composed in 2015
  2. Maurice Grosser (1983)
  3. Jack Larson (1986)

1988

- Free-fall, for chamber ensemble (seven players)

1989

- A Song of Return, cantata for small chorus and orchestra. Text by W. H. Auden.
- The Gift, for chorus, soprano solo, and orchestra

1990

- Wilde [Symphony No. IV], for baritone and orchestra. Runner-up for the 1991 Pulitzer Prize for Music.

1991

- Goethe Lieder, cycle of five songs with an epilogue
  1. Soprano or tenor and piano
  2. Version for seven players
  3. Version for orchestra
- Last Trombones, for five percussionists, two pianos, and six (or twelve) trombones

1992

- Specimen Days, cantata for baritone solo, chorus, and orchestra. Text by Will Graham, based on the life and writings of Walt Whitman.

1993

- Being Music, for baritone solo and string quartet. Text by Walt Whitman.
- Song and Dance, for violin and piano
- Invocation, for chorus (SA and accompaniment or SATB). Text by May Sarton.

1994

- Sonata-Duo, for flute and piano

1995

- Symphony No. V, for orchestra
- Night Song, for solo piano

1996

- Comrade and The Journey, two songs for baritone and piano

1997

- The Astronaut's Tale, chamber opera. Text by Jack Larson.
- Mists, three pieces for a cappella chorus. Texts by Hart Crane.

1998

- November Leaves, four songs for mezzo-soprano and orchestra. Texts by Alfred Corn.
- Sonnet, for baritone solo, flute, and organ. Text by Elizabeth Bishop.
- Trio, for violin, cello, and piano

1999

- From A Pioneer Songbook, for a cappella chorus

2000

- A Walt Whitman Sampler, for TTBB chorus and piano. Text by Will Graham.
- Venture, four songs for baritone and piano on poems by Toni Mergentime Levi
  - Version for baritone and orchestra was composed in 2016

2002

- Right River, Variations on an Original Theme for 'cello and string orchestra

2003

- Infinite Fraternity, for SATB chorus, baritone solo, flute, and viola. Texts by Nathaniel Hawthorne, Herman Melville, and Will Graham.
- High Bridge (rev. 2008), A Choral Symphony [No. VI] after poems of Hart Crane, for soprano, alto, tenor, baritone solos, chorus and orchestra

2008

- Moonshine, for double bass and vibraphone

2011

- Marion in Memory, for flute, clarinet, horn, violin, cello, piano, and marimba

2018

- K.G. in Space and Time, for flute, clarinet, horn, marimba (and vibraphone), piano (and celesta), violin, and cello
