= Keren Craig =

British fashion designer

- Born: 27 February 1976 (age 50); Lucerne, Switzerland
- Education: Brighton Art College and Chelsea College of Art and Design
- Label: Marchesa
- Children: 2

Keren Craig (born 27 February 1976 in Lucerne, Switzerland) is a Swiss-born British fashion designer. Together with Georgina Chapman, she founded the high-end fashion label Marchesa in 2004.

== Life and career ==
As teenagers, Craig met future partner Georgina Chapman while they were both students at Chelsea College of Art and Design. Craig graduated from Brighton Art College in 2000 with a BA (Hons) in Fashion Textiles with Business and afterwards concentrated on print and embroidery design. This included freelance printmaking at Calvin Klein and Dolce & Gabbana.

In 2004, Craig and Chapman launched Marchesa which is named after socialite Marchesa Luisa Casati. Investors of the brand include Giuseppe Cipriani and Steve Witkoff. In 2006, the label was named one of the CFDA/Vogue Fashion Fund's top ten finalists.

At Marchesa, Craig was Director of Textile Design.

In June 2019, among the Harvey Weinstein scandal, Craig announced that she was going to leave Marchesa.

== Personal life ==
Her mother is the animator Bobbie Spargo, and her grandfather is Nicholas Spargo, creator of Willo the Wisp.

== See also ==
- List of fashion designers
