= Luisa Casati =

Italian socialite, model and art patroness (1881–1957)

Marchesa Luisa Casati
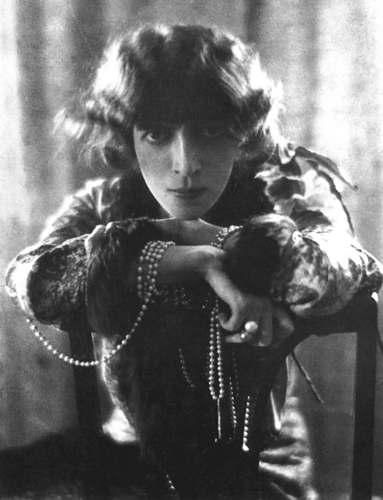
- Portrait of Marchesa Luisa Casati by Adolf de Meyer, 1912
- Born: Luisa Adele Rosa Maria Amman; 23 January 1881; Milan, Italy
- Died: 1 June 1957 (aged 76); Knightsbridge, London, England
- Resting place: Brompton Cemetery, London
- Other names: Luisa, Marchesa Casati Stampa di Soncino
- Occupations: Socialite, artists' model, art patroness
- Spouse(s): Camillo, Marchese Casati Stampa di Soncino (m. 1900; died 1946)
- Children: 1
- Website: www.marchesacasati.com

Luisa, Marchesa Casati Stampa di Soncino (born Luisa Adele Rosa Maria Amman; 23 January 1881 – 1 June 1957), was an Italian heiress, socialite, and patroness of the arts in early 20th-century Europe.

== Early life ==
Luisa Adele Rosa Maria Amman was born in Milan, the younger of two daughters of Alberto Amman and his wife Lucia (née Bressi). Her father was a prosperous textile manufacturer, born in 1847 to Austrian parents from Göfis in Vorarlberg, and her mother was born in 1857 in Vienna to an Italian father and Austrian mother. At the time of her parents' births, Milan and much of northern Italy belonged to the Austrian Empire. Her father was made a count by King Umberto I. Her mother died when Luisa was 13, and her father died two years later, making his daughters, Luisa and her older sister, Francesca (1880–1919, married Giulio Padulli), reportedly the wealthiest women in Italy.

== Marriage and descendants ==
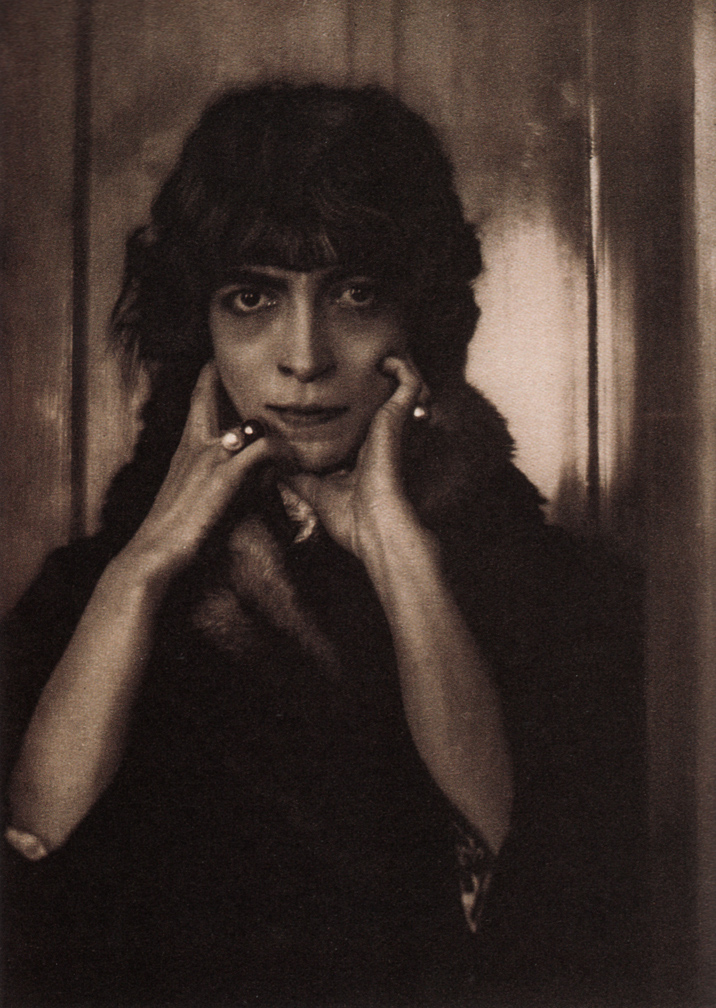
Portrait of Marchesa Luisa Casati, by Adolph de Meyer, 1912

In 1900, she married Camillo, Marquess Casati Stampa di Soncino (Muggiò, 12 August 1877 – Roma, 18 September 1946). The couple's only child, Cristina Casati Stampa di Soncino, was born the following year. The Casatis maintained separate residences for the duration of their marriage. They were legally separated in 1914. They remained married until his death in 1946.

In 1925, the couple's daughter Cristina (1901–1953), married Francis John Clarence Westenra Plantagenet Hastings, known as Viscount Hastings and later the 16th Earl of Huntingdon; they had one child, Lady Moorea Hastings (4 March 1928 – 21 October 2011), and divorced in 1943. The following year the Viscountess Hastings married Wogan Philipps; that marriage produced no children.

Luisa Casati's only grandchild, Lady Moorea Hastings, was the wife of politician and diarist Woodrow Wyatt from 1957 to 1966, and later married the adman Brinsley Black, named as one of the best-dressed Englishmen in the inaugural issue of Men in Vogue in 1965. She had a son with each husband:

- The Hon. Pericles Plantagenet James Casati Wyatt (born 1963), became an owner and operator of water parks and recreational-vehicle camps in Arizona; half-brother to journalist Petronella Wyatt.
- Octavius Black (Octavius Orlando Irvine Casati Black, born 1968), the founder of The Mind Gym, a mind-development system based in London;.

Moorea Hastings was so unmaternal that, on learning she was pregnant, she arranged with her first husband that childless cousins of his would care for the baby. When Wyatt later sued for divorce on grounds of her adultery, he was, unusually, given full custody of the child.

== Muse and patroness ==
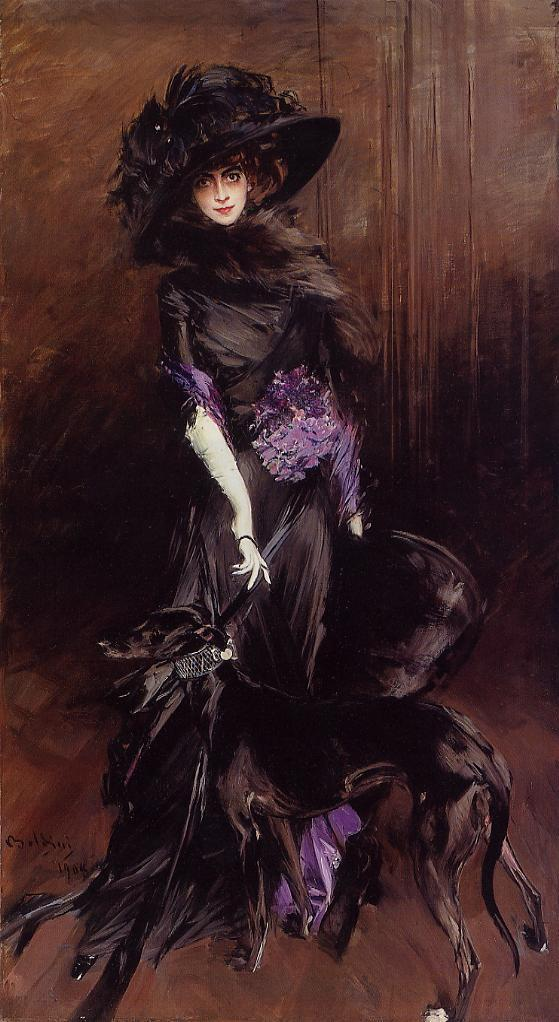
Marchesa Luisa Casati with a Greyhound, 1908, by Giovanni Boldini

Portrait by Augustus John, 1919

Casati was known for her eccentricities that entertained the surrounding European society for nearly three decades. Casati, hostess of Ballets Russes was occasionally regarded a legend among her contemporaries. She would occasionally entertain guests to Ballets Russes with a pair of leashed cheetahs and wearing live snakes as jewelry.

She captivated artists and literary figures such as Robert de Montesquiou, Romain de Tirtoff, Jean Cocteau, and Cecil Beaton. She had a long-term affair with the author Gabriele d'Annunzio, who is said to have based on her the character of Isabella Inghirami in Forse che sì forse che no (Maybe yes, maybe no) (1910). The character of La Casinelle, who appeared in two novels by Michel Georges-Michel, Dans la fete de Venise (1922) and Nouvelle Riviera (1924), was also inspired by her.

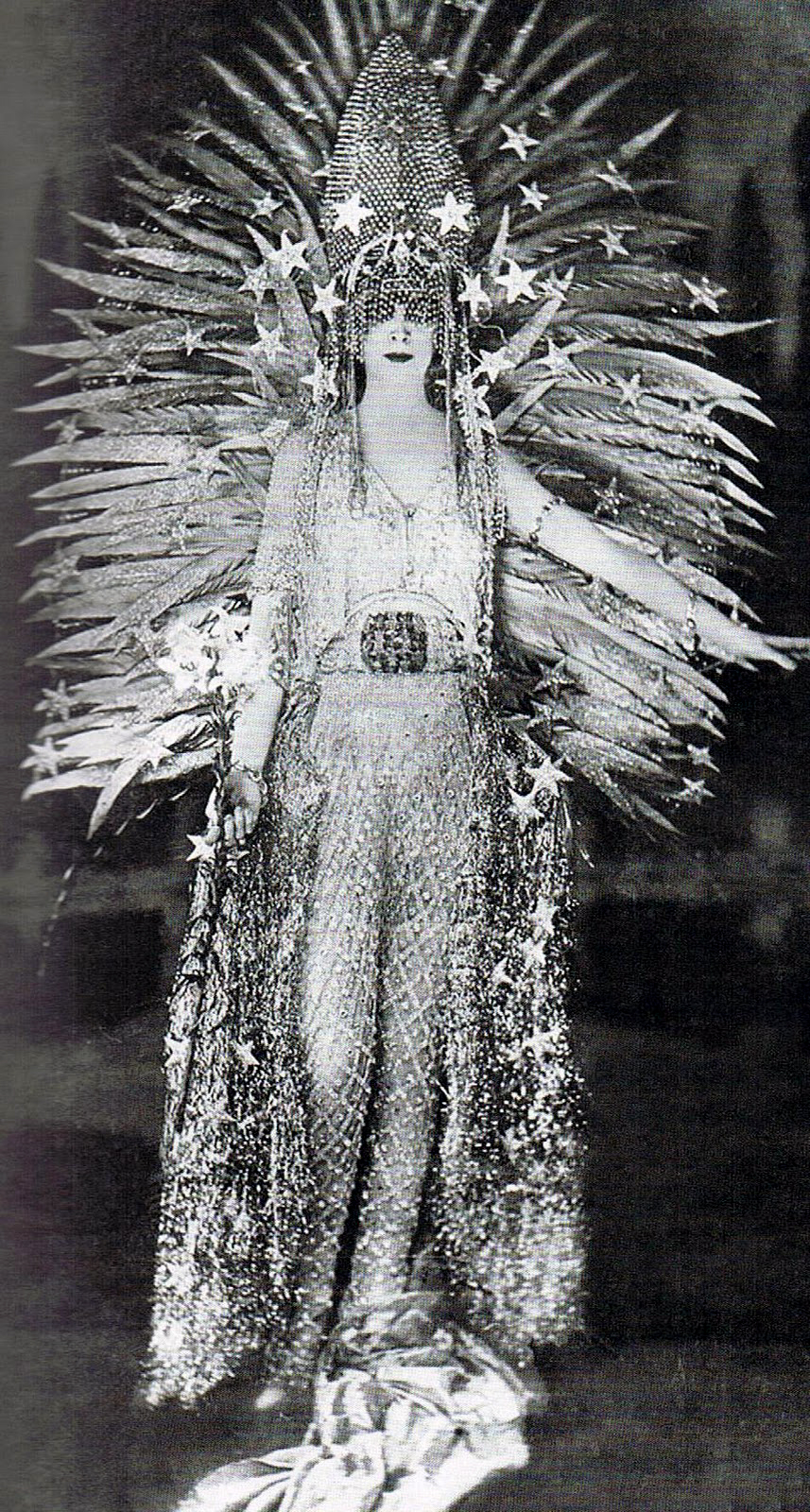
As fashion icon, costume by Léon Bakst, 'Queen of the Light', Paris, 1922

In 1910, Casati took up residence at the Palazzo Venier dei Leoni on Venice’s Grand Canal, owning it until circa 1924. In 1949, Peggy Guggenheim purchased the Palazzo from the heirs of Viscountess Castlerosse and made it her home for the following thirty years. Today, the palazzo houses the Peggy Guggenheim Collection.

Casati's soirées there would become legendary. Casati collected a menagerie of exotic animals, and patronized fashion designers such as Fortuny and Poiret. From 1919 to 1920 she lived at Villa San Michele in Capri, the tenant of the unwilling Axel Munthe. Her time on the Italian island, tolerant home to a wide collection of artists, gay men, and lesbians in exile, was described by British author Compton Mackenzie in his diaries.

Numerous portraits of her were painted and sculpted by artists as various as Giovanni Boldini, Paolo Troubetzkoy, Adolph de Meyer, Romaine Brooks (with whom she had an affair), Kees van Dongen, and Man Ray; many of them she paid for, as a wish to "commission her own immortality". She was muse to Italian Futurists such as F. T. Marinetti (who regarded her as a Futurist) Fortunato Depero, Giacomo Balla (who created the portrait-sculpture Marchesa Casati with Moving Eyes that was reproduced on the covere of Il mondo in March 30, 1919), and Umberto Boccioni. Augustus John's portrait of her is one of the most popular paintings at the Art Gallery of Ontario; Jack Kerouac wrote poems about it and Robert Fulford was impressed by it as a schoolboy.

There is an anecdote which tells of her meeting with her rival socialite and famous Countess Morosini with Casati saying to the countess: "When I was a child my father already told me about your famous beauty." To which Morosini replied: "Without going so far back, my dear, your husband, every evening, spoke to me about yours"; the implication being that they were on intimate terms.

== Later years and death ==
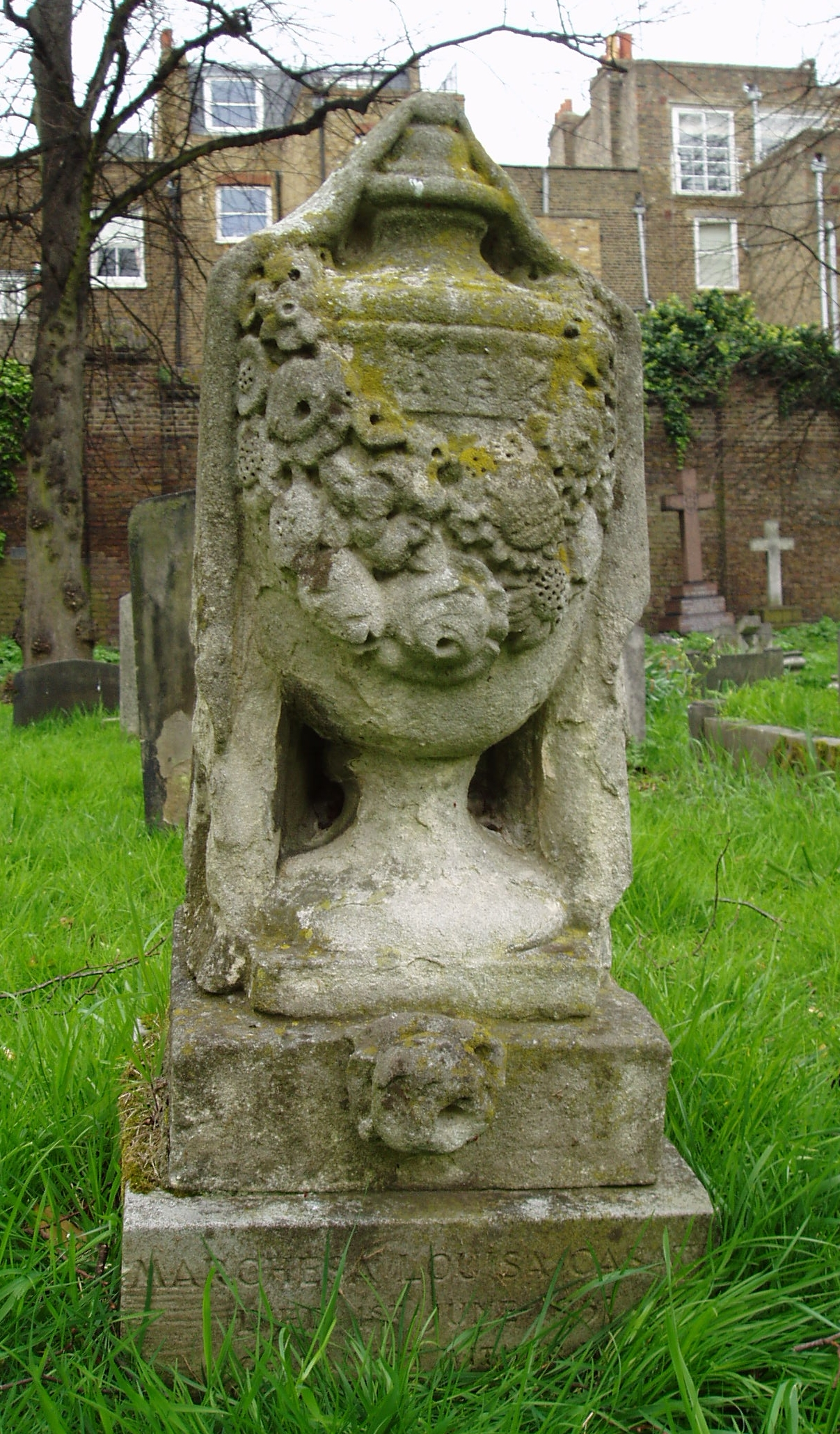
Gravestone for Luisa Casati (2004)

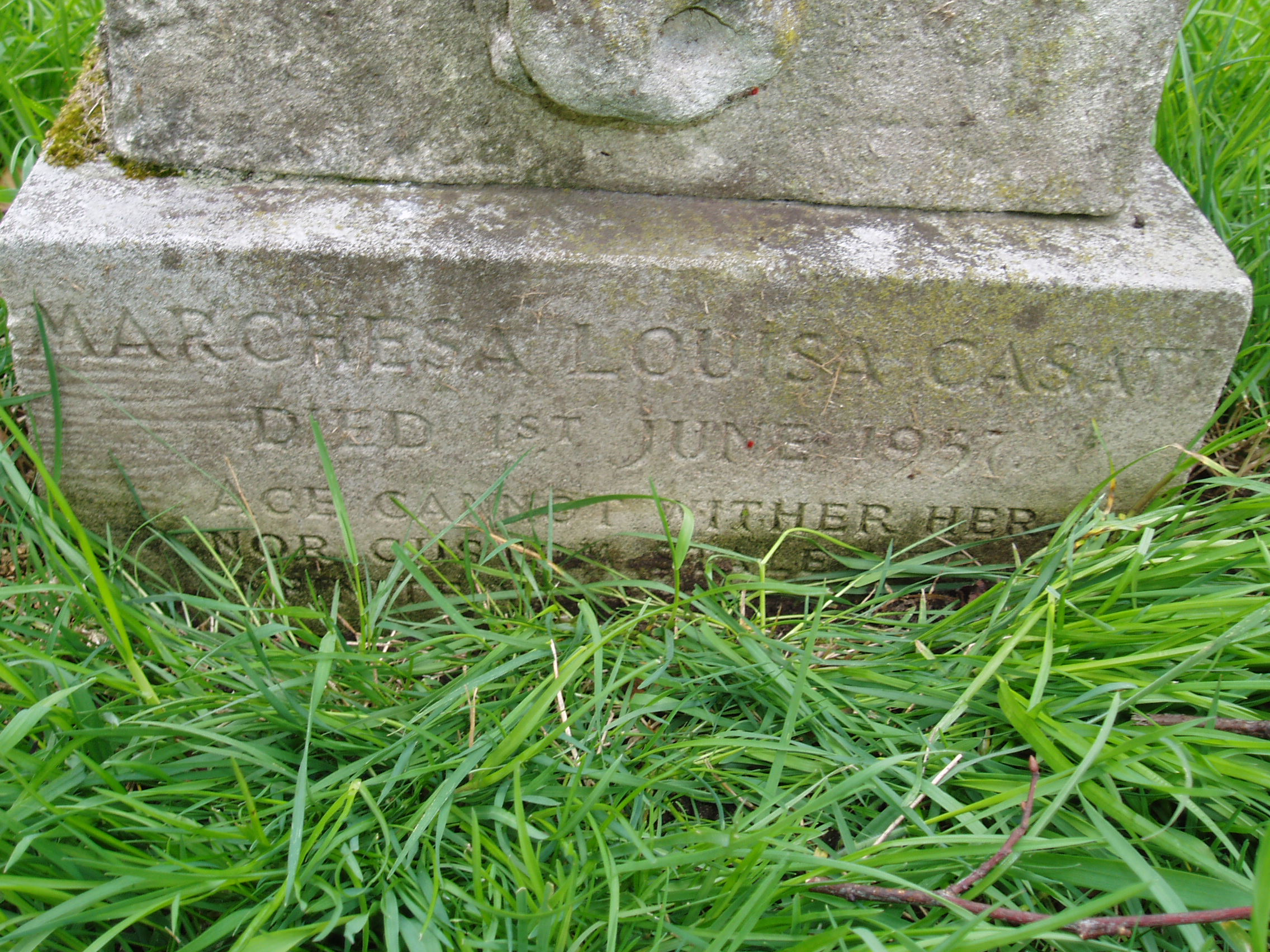
Epitaph on Luisa Casati's Gravestone (2004)

By 1930, Casati had amassed a personal debt of $25 million. As she was unable to pay her creditors, her personal possessions were auctioned off. Designer Coco Chanel was reportedly one of the bidders.

Casati fled to London, where she lived in comparative poverty in a one-room flat. She was rumoured to be seen rummaging in bins searching for feathers to decorate her hair. On 1 June 1957, Casati died of a stroke at her last residence, 32 Beaufort Gardens in Knightsbridge, aged 76. Following a requiem mass at Brompton Oratory, the Marchesa was interred in Brompton Cemetery.

She was buried at Brompton Cemetery in London wearing her black and leopard skin finery and a pair of false eyelashes. She was also interred with one of her beloved stuffed pekinese dogs. Her tombstone is a small grave marker in the shape of an urn draped in cloth with a swag of flowers to the front. The inscription on the tombstone, which misspells her "Louisa" rather than "Luisa", is inscribed with the quote, "Age cannot wither her, nor custom stale her infinite variety", from Shakespeare's Antony and Cleopatra.

== In popular culture ==
Characters based on Casati were played by Vivien Leigh in the play, La Contessa (1965) and by Ingrid Bergman in the movie, A Matter of Time (1976).

In 1998, John Galliano based his spring/summer Christian Dior collection on her. Gowns from this collection have been displayed at the Metropolitan Museum of Art Fashion Institute. Casati served as inspiration for another of Galliano's ensembles created for his autumn/winter 2007/2008 Bal des Artistes haute couture collection for Dior.

Designer Alexander McQueen's spring/summer 2007 collection, Sarabande, was inspired by Casati.

Casati is also the namesake of the Marchesa fashion house started by British designers Georgina Chapman and Keren Craig.

In May 2009, Karl Lagerfeld debuted his 2010 Cruise-wear collection on the Lido in Venice, for which Casati was once again a major muse. In February 2016, London based designer Omar Mansoor mused his autumn winter collection on Casati at London Fashion Week and Paris Fashion Week.

In 2013, Italian publisher Rizzoli Libri published the biographical graphic novel La Casati: La musa egoista by artist Vanna Vinci. An English translation has been available from Europe Comics since 2015 with the title Casati: The Selfish Muse.

In 2020, Italian rapper Achille Lauro dressed as Casati for his performance at the most important musical competition in Italy, the Sanremo Music Festival.

On 21 March 2020 the opera Ritratto premiered with the Dutch National Opera: an opera by Willem Jeths on the life of Luisa Casati.

In 2021, singer, songwriter and actress Lady Gaga referenced Casati in one of her pictures of the photoshoot from the December British Vogue/November Vogue Italia issues.

In 2021, Canadian author T. H. Cini wrote a fictional novelette based on meeting the Marchesa (Luisa Casati) in the narrators’ dreams. The story is called, The Eyes of a Marchesa from the book The Dream-Escape.

The Marchesa and the Palazzo Vernier dei Leoni appear in The Glassmaker, a novel by Tracy Chevalier published in September 2024.
