= Sanford Sylvan =

American opera singer

Sanford Sylvan

Sanford Sylvan (December 19, 1953 – January 29, 2019) was an American baritone.

== Biography ==
Sanford Mead Sylvan was born in New York City on December 19, 1953, and grew up in Syosset, New York. Starting at age 13 he participated in the Juilliard School's pre-college program and beginning in 1974 he spent four summers at the Tanglewood Music Center, where he studied with Phyllis Curtin, which he later cited as transforming his career: "I am the singer that I am today because of Phyllis Curtin." He worked as an usher at the Metropolitan Opera while completing his undergraduate degree at the Manhattan School of Music. He made his Glyndebourne Festival debut in 1994 as Leporello in Don Giovanni by Mozart.

He performed with many leading conductors, opera companies and orchestras including Houston Grand Opera, San Francisco Opera, New York City Opera, the New York Philharmonic, Boston Symphony, Cleveland Orchestra, Los Angeles Philharmonic, San Francisco Symphony, London Symphony Orchestra, Royal Concertgebouworkest, Melbourne Symphony and the NHK Symphony. He performed during his career at the Edinburgh, Marlboro, Tanglewood, Vienna, Holland, Oregon Bach and Carmel Bach festivals. He created the roles of Chou En-lai (Zhou Enlai) in Nixon in China and the title role in The Death of Klinghoffer by John Adams.

By 1997 he had established such a reputation as a recitalist with pianist David Breitman that the New York Times, when calendaring their recital five months hence, wrote: "No program had been announced at press time. With this fine and sensitive baritone and his equally deft pianist, it doesn't matter."

Sylvan received five Grammy nominations for his participation these recordings: Charles Fussell's Symphony for Baritone and Orchestra "Wilde" (2009); Adams's The Wound-Dresser (1990), which was written for Sylvan; Fauré's L'horizon chimérique (1999); Beloved That Pilgrimage (1992), a compilation of songs by Theodore Chanler, Samuel Barber, and Aaron Copland; and the soundtrack for the Penny Woolcock film of Adams' opera The Death of Klinghoffer (2003). Of his performance in that film, chosen for the 2003 Sundance Festival, Anthony Tommasini wrote that Sylvan "should have received an Oscar nomination for his courageous portrayal of the murder victim Leon Klinghoffer". He premiered a number of works by Adams, Philip Glass, Peter Maxwell Davies, John Harbison and Christopher Rouse, including Rouse's Requiem in 2007 with the Los Angeles Philharmonic.

A frequent collaborator with the director Peter Sellars, Sylvan appeared in Sellars' stagings of Mozart's Cosi fan tutte as Alfonso and Le nozze di Figaro in the title role, and operas by John Adams including A Flowering Tree presented at Chicago's Harris Theater and in 2009 at Lincoln Center's Mostly Mozart Festival. Along with his performing schedule, he was also Chair of Voice at the Juilliard School. Along with this, he was on the voice faculties of McGill University Schulich School of Music in Montréal and the Bard Conservatory Graduate Vocal Arts Program.

In 1993 he came out as a gay man in an interview with the New York Times and in 1996 he married his then partner.

Sylvan died at his home in Manhattan on January 29, 2019, at the age of 65.

== Notable students ==
- Gordon Bintner
- Rihab Chaieb
- Estelí Gomez
- Philippe Sly
- Lucas van Lierop
