= Het pand der goden =

Surinamese opera

Het pand der goden (Dutch for The Building of the Gods) is an opera written by composer Johannes Helstone.

Het pand der goden is recorded as being the first opera by a Surinamese composer. A drama in five acts, it premiered in the Thalia Theatre (Paramaribo), Suriname.

== Plot ==
Hero Haika Marghanold and his wife Heloinka welcome their first child, a daughter. Preferring a son, Marghanold decides to treat another boy, born on the same day, as his own adopted son. This act defies the gods' will, leading them to curse their daughter by making her irresistibly beautiful, resulting in her mysterious disappearance from the earth during a storm.

The loss of his daughter causes Hero such profound grief that he dies shortly after Olindo's birth. In the wake of these tragedies, Heloinka and Olindo isolate themselves from the rest of the world.

As time passes, Olindo hears rumors that suggest his sister might still be alive in the north. Motivated by the chance to reunite with her, he embarks on a dangerous journey to find her. His journey is marked by adversity, including a shipwreck, from which he barely survives.

Committed to finding his sister and returning to his mother, Olindo begins a period of penance. In the gripping final act, his perseverance pays off, and he finally finds his long-lost sister.

== Premiere and disappearance ==
The premiere is said to have taken place on May 10, 1906, under the direction of the composer. The first review on May 17 gives Thursday, May 12, as the initial date. The audience (Helstone was adorned with a wreath) and artists were wildly enthusiastic.

== Rediscovery ==
During the opening of the Suriname Cultural Center in February 1954, it was performed again, but only the overture. This was because three other pieces were also performed. It was then observed that, although it was a skilled work, it was completely outside the Surinamese music tradition. In 1963, there was a brief retrospective on Helstone's life, during which the content was mentioned again, as well as the fact that the work might have had several performances in German in Berlin. After that, it seemed to disappear for good.

During the late 20th century, violist John Helstone of the Rotterdam Philharmonic Orchestra came into the possession of his Johannes Helstone's archives. Alongside his cousin Astrid Helstone, they organized the documents, receiving assistance from David Bazen of the Royal Concertgebouw Orchestra. Their research led to a biography of Helstone by Diederik Burgersdijk titled Een opera voor Suriname; over Het pand der goden, and led to a (partial) performance by the Concertgebouw Orchestra under the direction of Otto Tausk.

== Concertgebouw premiere ==
Roles, voice types, 2024 cast
Roles	Voice type	Premiere cast Amsterdam 2024
Heloinka	soprano	Judith van Wanroij
Olindo	tenor	Lucas van Lierop
Athlolinda	soprano	Aylin Sezer
Een Grijssard	baritone	Jasper Leever
Haloff	baritone	German Olvera
Halid	bass	Jasper Leever
Het Dienstpersoneel	chorus	Cappella Amsterdam
