= Orpheus und Eurydike =

1926 opera by Ernst Krenek

- Opera by Ernst Krenek
- Librettist: Krenek
- Language: German
- Based on: Orpheus and Eurydice, play by Oskar Kokoschka
- Premiere: 27 November 1926; Staatstheater Kassel

Orpheus und Eurydike (Orpheus and Eurydice) is an opera by Ernst Krenek. The German text is based on a play by Oskar Kokoschka. Kokoschka began writing his play during his convalescence (from wounds received on the Ukrainian front in 1915) and it premiered in 1921, one year before Rilke's Sonnets to Orpheus appeared. In 1923 he let it be known that he was looking for a composer to write incidental music. Kokoschka's expressionist, psychological treatment of the Orpheus myth, marked by his passion for Alma Mahler, appealed to Krenek so he approached Kokoschka.

They quickly decided that the work should become an opera and Krenek received carte blanche to adapt the German play, condensing it by a third in the process, and setting it to an atonal score. At one point Krenek sought help from Eduard Erdmann, who gave up. In this new form it premiered as Krenek's Op. 21 in Kassel at the Staatstheater on 27 November 1926 with Ernst Zulauf conducting, directed by Paul Bekker who was then director general there.

== Roles ==
Roles, voice types, premier cast
Role	Voice type	Premiere cast, 27 November 1026 Conductor: Ernst Zulauf
Orpheus	tenor	Martin Kremer
Eurydike	soprano	Grete Reinhardt
Psyche	soprano	Alice Tanner-Wünsch
Drunk	bass	
Soldier	baritone	
Sailor	tenor	
Fool	baritone	
Three Furies	mezzo-soprano	1st: Mary Keysell
