= L'Esprit de L'Escalier =

"L'Esprit de L'Escalier" is a 2021 fantasy short story by Catherynne M. Valente, retelling the story of Orpheus and Eurydice in a modern setting. It was first published on Tor.com.

== Synopsis ==
Months ago, Orpheus successfully rescued Eurydice from the underworld, but despite his efforts, she is still depressed — and a zombie — and their relationship is failing.

== Reception ==
Publishers Weekly called it "clever" and "challenging".

Year	Award	Category	Result	Ref.
2022	Eugie Award	—	Finalist	
2022	Hugo Award	Novelette	Finalist	
2022	Locus Award	Novelette	Finalist	
