= Geoffrey Paterson =

British conductor (born 1983)

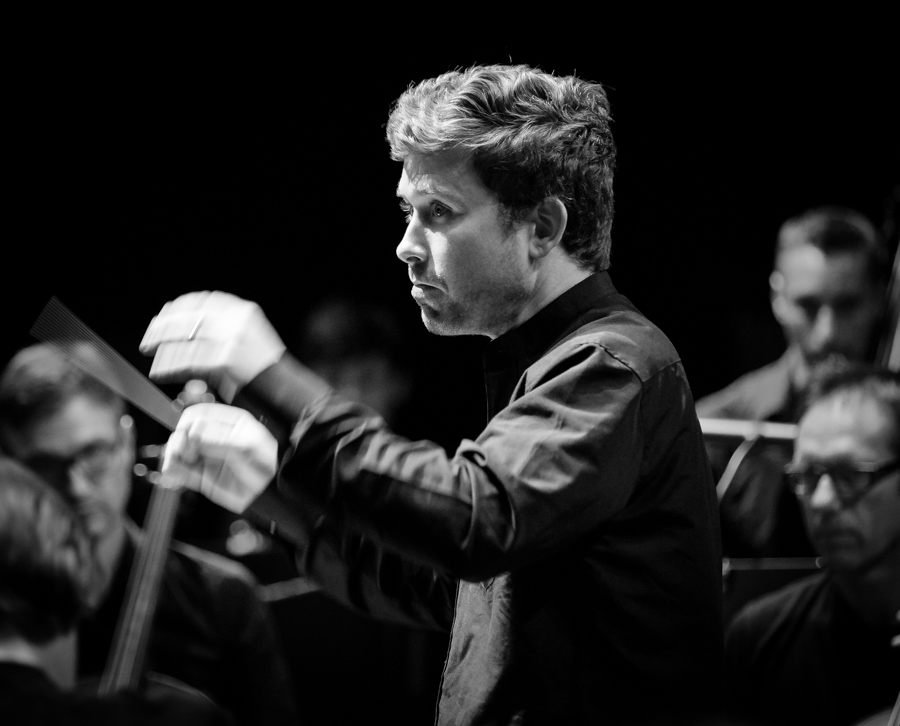
- Paterson at the 2018 Kongsberg Jazzfestival
- Born: 14 July 1983 (age 43); Yorkshire, England
- Education: St John's College, Cambridge
- Occupations: Conductor of classical music (active 1998–present)
- Website: geoffreypaterson.co.uk

Geoffrey Paterson (born 14 July 1983) is a British conductor.

== Early career ==
Born in Yorkshire, England, Geoffrey Paterson began conducting at the age of 15, while a pupil at The Judd School in Tonbridge. He soon began organising concerts, both near his family home in Kent and later as an undergraduate at St John's College, Cambridge where he studied composition with Alexander Goehr. He took a master's degree at the RSAMD and participated in masterclasses with Pierre Boulez at the Lucerne Festival Academy before training as a repetiteur at the National Opera Studio. At the age of 25 he won both First Prize and the Audience Prize at the Ninth Leeds Conductors Competition.

== Conducting ==
He was a Jette Parker Young Artist at the Royal Opera House, where he assisted Antonio Pappano, Mark Elder, Andris Nelsons and Daniele Gatti, and has frequently returned to Covent Garden to conduct. In 2013 and 2014 he was a musical assistant to Kirill Petrenko at the Bayreuth Festival, and his operatic conducting has included appearances at Glyndebourne, the Royal Danish Opera, the Bavarian State Opera, Oper Frankfurt, Dutch National Opera and English National Opera.

He has conducted orchestras in the UK and abroad including the Orchestra of the Age of Enlightenment, the Philharmonia, Danish National Symphony Orchestra, Copenhagen Phil, Norwegian Radio Orchestra, Stavanger Symphony Orchestra, BBC Symphony Orchestra, BBC Philharmonic, BBC National Orchestra of Wales, BBC Scottish Symphony Orchestra, Orchestre national de Lille, Hamburg Symphony Orchestra and Nagoya Philharmonic Orchestra.

In addition to his work at Bayreuth, he has appeared at other festivals including the Holland Festival, Aldeburgh Festival and Bregenz Festival, Bergen International Festival and Edinburgh Festival.

He is a noted exponent of contemporary music, working frequently with the London Sinfonietta including performances at the BBC Proms, and with Birmingham Contemporary Music Group, Royal Liverpool Philharmonic Ensemble 10:10, Bergen Philharmonic BIT20 Ensemble, Red Note Ensemble and Nash Ensemble as well as recording for NMC, Delphian Records, Resonus Classics, Berlin Classics, Neu Records and ACT.

Since 2015 he has worked extensively with jazz saxophonist Marius Neset on numerous concert and recording projects.

== Recordings ==
- Marius Neset: Viaduct with London Sinfonietta for ACT
- Marius Neset: Snowmelt with London Sinfonietta for ACT
- Massenet: Le Portrait de Manon with Southbank Sinfonia for Opera Rara
- Josep Maria Guix: Images of Broken Light with the London Sinfonietta for Neu Records
- Ben Foskett: Dinosaur with the Hallé for NMC
- Philharmonia Composers Academy Vol. 3 with the Philharmonia for NMC
- Willem Jeths: Ritratto with Dutch National Opera for Challenge Records
- Thomas Hyde: Symphony with BBC Scottish Symphony Orchestra for Resonus Classics
- Marius Neset: Summer Dance with Norwegian Radio Orchestra for ACT
- James Dillon: Tanz/haus with Red Note Ensemble for Delphian Records
- James Dillon: EMBLEMATA:Carnival with Red Note Ensemble for Delphian Records
- Simon Höfele: Nobody Knows with BBC Symphony Orchestra for Berlin Classics
- Robert Plane: Isotonic with BBC Philharmonic for Resonus Classics
