= Orpheus Alive =

2019 ballet by Missy Mazzoli

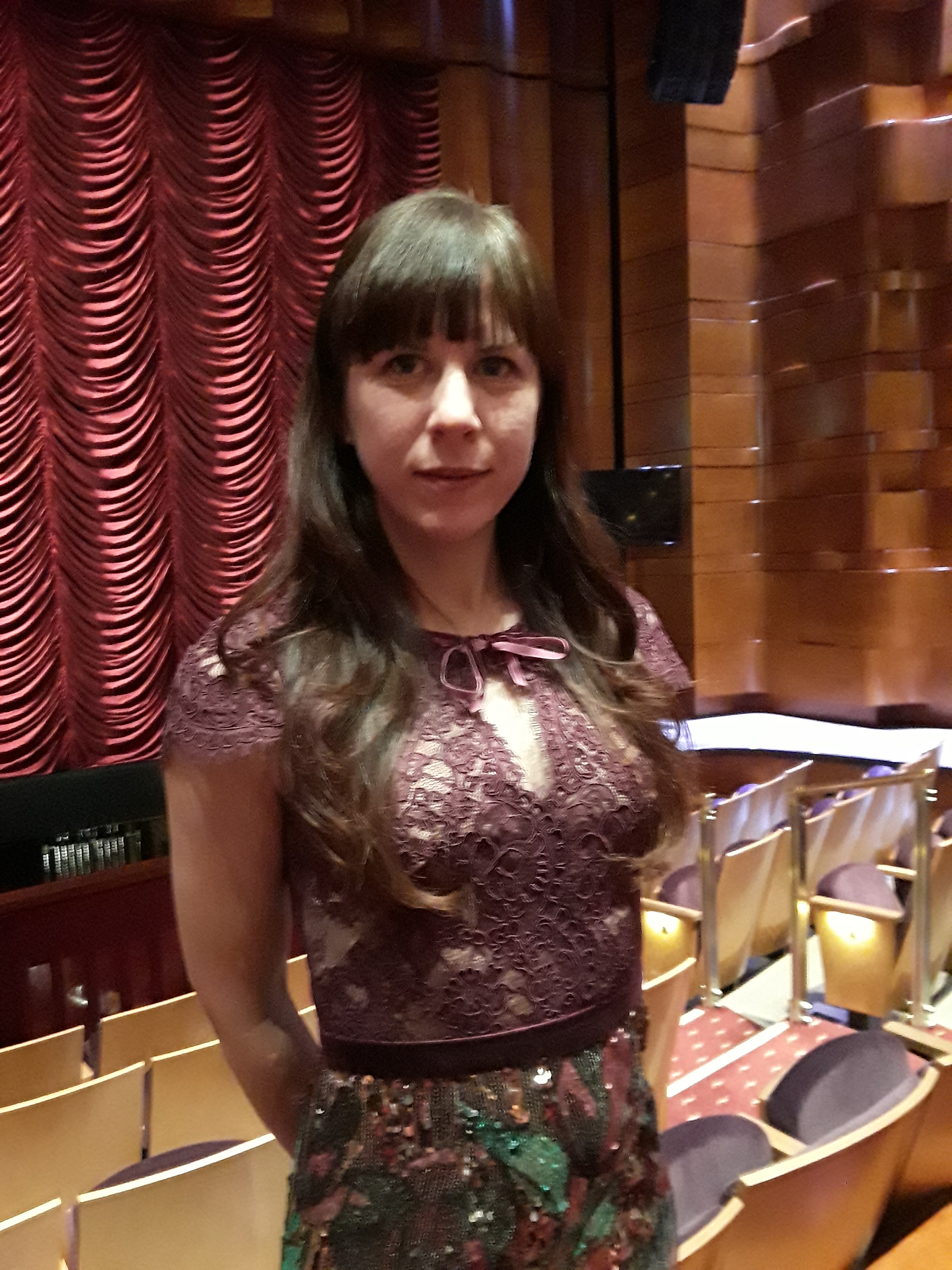
Missy Mazzoli in 2018

Orpheus Alive is a ballet composed in 2019 by Missy Mazzoli, choreographed by Robert Binet, and conceived by Binet in collaboration with the playwright Rosamund Small. It was commissioned by the National Ballet of Canada, which first performed it at the Four Seasons Centre in Toronto on November 15, 2019. The narrative Orpheus Alive is a re-imagining of the story of Orpheus and Eurydice, casting Orpheus as a woman and Eurydice as a man. Mazzoli subsequently arranged a 15-minute suite of music from the ballet titled Orpheus Undone, which was commissioned by the Chicago Symphony Orchestra and given its world premiere under the conductor Riccardo Muti on March 31, 2022.

== Composition ==
Orpheus Alive has a duration of roughly one hour and is divided into six sections:

1. Part 1
2. Part 2: Real World Conflict
3. Part 3
4. Part 4
5. Part 5
6. Part 6

=== Instrumentation ===
The work is scored for an orchestra comprising two flutes (2nd doubling piccolo), two oboes, two clarinets, two bassoons (2nd doubling contrabassoon), four horns, two trumpets, two trombones, bass trombone, tuba, two percussionists, electronics, piano, harp, and strings.

== Reception ==
Reviewing the world premiere, Michael Crabb of the Toronto Star praised Mazzoli's "thrillingly full orchestral score," but nevertheless gave a mixed review of the ballet, writing, "As Orpheus Alive moves along, amidst its large and energetic ensembles of Furies, Apparitions and Underworld Spirits, its layered themes become entangled in a way that makes its ending at once stark yet unfocused, denying the ballet the emotional wallop towards which the music suggests its building." He added, "It's an audacious work from a 28-year-old choreographer commendably eager to test any number of conventional ballet boundaries, gender stereotypes included, but at times comes across as just a bit too clever for its own good." Penelope Ford of The Globe and Mail similarly criticized changes to the Orpheus myth, despite noting, "The brightest star here is Missy Mazzoli, whose score is elegant and dramatic, with sliding brass punctuated by a mortal tick-tock of percussion. This is the music with which Orpheus could charm the gods."
