= Georgina Chapman =

English fashion designer and actress (born 1976)

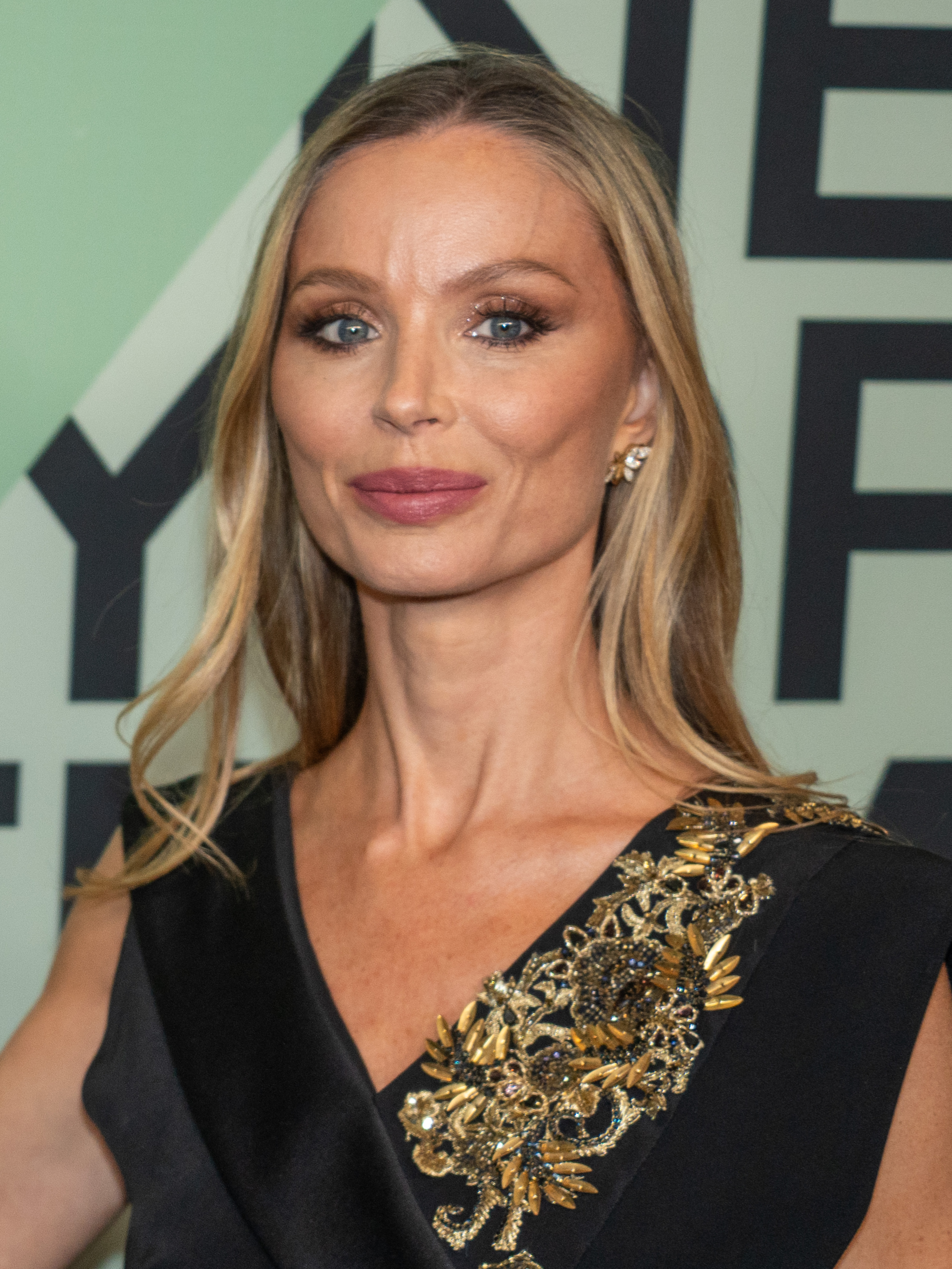
- Chapman in 2025
- Born: Georgina Rose Chapman; 14 April 1976 (age 50); Hammersmith, London, England
- Education: University of the Arts London
- Occupations: Fashion designer; actress
- Years active: 2001–present
- Label: Marchesa
- Spouse: Harvey Weinstein (m. 2007; div. 2021)
- Partner: Adrien Brody (2019–present)
- Children: 2

Georgina Rose Chapman (born 14 April 1976) is an English fashion designer and actress. She was a regular cast member on Project Runway All Stars (2012–2019) and, together with Keren Craig, is a co-founder of the fashion label Marchesa. Chapman was married to film producer Harvey Weinstein before leaving him in 2017 in the wake of allegations of sexual abuse against him.

== Life and career ==
Chapman was born in Hammersmith and grew up in Richmond, London. She is the daughter of Caroline Wonfor, a journalist, and Brian Chapman, a co-owner of the coffee company Percol. Chapman attended Marlborough College in Wiltshire. In her 20s, Chapman modelled in an advertisement for Head & Shoulders and for the throat lozenge Soothers. Chapman met future business partner Keren Craig while they both were students at Chelsea College of Art and Design. Chapman graduated from Wimbledon School of Art in 2001 and began her career as a costume designer. After graduation, Chapman appeared in various television shows and films.

In 2004, she and Craig launched Marchesa, named after socialite Marchesa Luisa Casati. Investors include Giuseppe Cipriani and Steve Witkoff. In 2006, the label was named one of the CFDA/Vogue Fashion Fund's top 10 finalists. According to the 2015 Sunday Times Rich List, Chapman had a net worth of £15 million. From 2012 to 2019, Chapman was a judge on the Weinstein-produced TV show Project Runway: All Stars.

In May 2019, Chapman's design for an evening gown was featured in the 2019 Met Gala in New York as worn by Hollywood actress Constance Wu on the runway and staircase for the event.

== Personal life ==
Chapman and film producer Harvey Weinstein began dating in 2004, before he separated from his first wife. They married on 15 December 2007 in Connecticut. They have two children together. On 10 October 2017, Chapman announced she was divorcing Weinstein after more than 100 women made accusations of rape, assault, or sexual harassment against him. They reached a settlement in January 2018 and their divorce was finalized in July 2021.

Since 2019, she has been in a relationship with American actor Adrien Brody.

== Filmography ==
=== Film ===
Year	Title	Role	Notes
2001	Desire	Eve	Short film
2003	Shanghai Knights	Debutante	
2004	Bride & Prejudice	Anne	
2004	A Soldier's Tunic	Katherine Cranborn	
2004	Piccadilly Jim	Connie 1	
2005	Derailed	Candy	
2005	The Business	Carly	
2005	Match Point	Nola's co-worker	
2005	Unleashed	Floozy 1	
2005	Zemanovaload	Jenna	
2006	Factory Girl	Interviewer	
2007	Awake	Penny Carver Elliot	
2007	The Nanny Diaries	TriBeCa fashionista	
2007	Don't	Featured woman	Fake trailer in between Planet Terror and Death Proof in Grindhouse

=== Television ===
Year	Title	Role	Notes
2002	Jeffrey Archer: The Truth	Secretary	
2003	Sons & Lovers	Louie	TV movie
2004	Rosemary & Thyme	Celia Llewellyn	1 episode
2006	Project Catwalk	Herself	Guest panelist on Season 1, Episode 9
2008	Project Runway	Herself	Guest judge on Season 5, Episode 12
2009	Gossip Girl	Herself	
2012–2019	Project Runway: All Stars	Judge	
