= Ana James =

New Zealand singer (born 1976)

Ana James is a New Zealand-born operatic soprano who has appeared with The Royal Opera, the Glyndebourne Festival, and Opera Holland Park as well as with opera companies in Europe, South America, Asia and New Zealand.

== Early life, education and early performances ==
James was born in Dunedin, New Zealand. She trained at the Victoria University School of Music, Manhattan School of Music and the Royal College of Music's Benjamin Britten International Opera School.

Her notable college performances included The Queen of the Night in The Magic Flute at the RCM, a role she also sang for British Youth Opera in 2003. In 2004 she was the inaugural recipient of the Kiri Te Kanawa Foundation Award, which supports young operatic artists at the start of their careers. James was awarded 2nd place in the Mobil Song Quest, New Zealand's premier singing competition (now known as the Lexus Song Quest), in 2000. She studied with Emily Mair in New Zealand, Marlena Malas in New York, and Lillian Watson in London.

== Career ==
From 2005 to 2007 she was a member of the Jette Parker Young Artists programme at the Royal Opera House. While a member of the Jette Parker programme, her appearances with the Royal Opera included Barbarina in David McVicar's production of The Marriage of Figaro, Serpina in La serva padrona. and Elisa in Il Re Pastore in 2005. Her performance in The Marriage of Figaro at the Royal Opera House is preserved in the 2006 live recording released on DVD by Opus Arte. After leaving the programme, her performances with other opera companies have included Pamina in The Magic Flute with the Glyndebourne touring company (2008), Gretel in Hansel and Gretel with New Zealand Opera (2008), Donna Anna in Don Giovanni with Opera Holland Park (2010), Donna Anna in Don Giovanni at the Glyndebourne Festival (2011) and Miss Wordsworth in Albert Herring at the Théâtre du Capitole in Toulouse (2013). In 2013 she also sang Konstanze in a concert version of Die Entführung aus dem Serail in the Theatro Municipal in Rio de Janeiro with the Brazilian Symphony Orchestra under Alejo Pérez.

Ana James sang Ygraine in a 2007 recording of Ariane et Barbe-bleue with the BBC Symphony Orchestra conducted by Leon Botstein. In a 2012 live recording of I quatro rusteghi she sang Felice with the Royal Liverpool Philharmonic Orchestra conducted by Vasily Petrenko. In the 2013 live recording of Parsifal at the Proms, she sang a flower maiden with the Hallé Orchestra conducted by Mark Elder.

James sang Donna Anna in Don Giovanni in 2014 and the title role in Lucia di Lammermoor in 2015 for the touring company Diva Opera, before retiring from singing, due to family commitments.

== Discography ==
- 2006: The Marriage of Figaro, Orchestra and Chorus of the Royal Opera House conducted by Antonio Pappano (Opus Arte, OABD7033D)
- 2007: Ariane et Barbe-bleue, BBC Symphony Orchestra conducted by Leon Botstein.(Telarc, CD80680)
- 2013: Parsifal, Hallé Orchestra conducted by Mark Elder. (Hallé, CDHLD7539)
- 2018: I quatro rusteghi, Royal Liverpool Philharmonic Orchestra conducted by Vasily Petrenko. (Rubicon, RCD1024)
