= Leeds Conductors Competition =

The Leeds Conductors Competition, is a music competition for young British conductors in the city of Leeds.

== History ==
The competition was founded by Michael Johnson of the Leeds City Council and David Lloyd-Jones, Founder Director of Opera North with the support of Sir Charles Groves. The competition has strong ties with the Orchestra of Opera North. The first competition was in 1984 and has taken place eight more times since then . The winner of the first prize of the competition has the opportunity to conduct most of the UK's major orchestras, including the BBC Philharmonic, BBC Scottish Symphony Orchestra, BBC Symphony Orchestra, Bournemouth Symphony Orchestra, City of Birmingham Symphony Orchestra, City of London Sinfonia, London Symphony Orchestra, Orchestra of Opera North, Philharmonia Orchestra, Royal Philharmonic Orchestra and the Royal Liverpool Philharmonic Orchestra.

Following a hiatus, the tenth competition was to be held in June 2021, but was cancelled during the pandemic.

== Winners ==
- Sian Edwards (1984)
- Grant Llewellyn (1986)
- Martyn Brabbins (1988)
- Philip Ellis (1992)
- Brad Cohen (1994)
- Garry Walker (1999)
- Paul Watkins (2002)
- Alexander Shelley (2005)
- Geoffrey Paterson (2009)
