= Hôtel de Pékin =

Hôtel de Pékin – Dreams for a Dragon Queen is a 2008 English language opera by the Dutch composer Willem Jeths to a libretto by Friso Haverkamp. The opera was commissioned for opening of the opera theatre in the nl:Wilminktheater en Muziekcentrum Enschede, part of the new nl:Nationaal Muziekkwartier in Enschede on 22 November 2008.

The opera is based on the deathbed reminiscences of the empress Cixi.

== Recording ==
- Hôtel de Pékin - Monique Krüs, Dennis Wilgenhof, Mark Stone, Angela Kerrison, Iestyn Morris, Robert Burt, Mijke Sekhuis, Karin Strobos, Netherlands Radio Choir, Netherlands Radio Chamber Philharmonic, conducted by Michael Schonwandt. Etcetera (label) 2012
