= Marquesa (disambiguation) =

Marquesa is a title of nobility.

Marquesa may also refer to:

- Marquesas Islands, a group of islands in French Polynesia
- Marquesan language, the language of the Marquesas Islands
- Marquesas Keys, a group of uninhabited islands near Florida
- Survivor: Marquesas, the fourth season of the television series Survivor
- Rambler Marquesa, a show car by American Motors Corporation
