= Internationale Händel-Akademie =

German classical music institution

The Internationale Händel-Akademie in Karlsruhe is one of the institutions dedicated to the cultivation of the work of Baroque composer George Frideric Handel and his time.

Since 1986, parallel to the Karlsruhe Handel Festival, the international Handel Festival Karlsruhe of the Badisches Staatstheater Karlsruhe offers master classes in historical performance practice and a scientific symposium.

Again and again, lecturers and courses at the Academy provided important impulses for the performance practice of the Festival. For example, the director Sigrid T'Hooft gave gesture courses in historical performance practice before her directorial work in the context of the successes with Lotario and especially with Radamisto gesture courses in the International Handel Academy. Many members of the Deutsche Händel-Solisten give or have given courses.

In 2016, for the first time, participants of the Academy worked as trainees in the orchestra at the Händel-Festspiele Karlsruhe.

The artistic director is Thomas Seedorf, from 2014 to 2018 together with Michael Fichtenholz.
