= Kiri Te Kanawa Foundation =

New Zealand foundation

The Kiri Te Kanawa Foundation is a charitable foundation set up by the celebrated opera soprano Kiri Te Kanawa to help music students.

== Vision ==
The vision of the Kiri Te Kanawa Foundation is that young New Zealand singers and musicians with complete dedication to their art may receive judicious mentoring and support to assist them in realizing their dreams.

The Foundation's mission is to establish, build and manage a trust fund to provide financial and career support to such talented New Zealanders. The first person to be awarded a grant under the trust was the young Dunedin born soprano Ana James.
