= Händel-Festspiele Karlsruhe =

Classical music German festival

The Händel-Festspiele Karlsruhe is a festival event for the works of the baroque composer George Frideric Handel.

From 1977 to 1984 the Badisches Staatstheater Karlsruhe organised the so-called Handel Days, before the Baden town became the youngest of the three Handel festival venues in 1985. Since then, they have been held annually around 23 February, the composer's birthday. Initially, two, and in recent years one, own production of a stage work was presented. In addition, there are guest performances, orchestra and chamber music concerts.

In 1984, a separate orchestra, the "Deutsche Händel-Solisten", was founded and is integrated into the festival programme. There is close cooperation between the Handel Festival and the Händelgesellschaft, founded in 1989 Karlsruhe e. V. and with the Internationale Händel-Akademie founded in 1986 with master classes for baroque performance practice.

The management has been taken over by Michael Fichtenholz since 2014.
