= Orphee l'Amour Eurydice =

Opera by Christoph Willibald Gluck & Wolny Zbigniew

Orphée, L'Amour, Eurydice
- Opera by Christoph Willibald Gluck & Zbigniew Wolny
- Librettist: Hélène Vrijdag
- Language: English, French
- Premiere: 19 March 2022; Enschede

Orphée, L'Amour, Eurydice (OAE) is an opera in three acts (five scenes) for a tenor (who must also play electric guitar), a dancer and an actor, with pre-recorded electronic music using music from Gluck's Orfeo ed Euridice, composed by Zbigniew Wolny. The opera makes use of both projection screens and virtual reality headsets (VR).

The production was directed by Robin Coops, with VR-direction by Avinash Changa. The opera was co-produced by the Netherlands' three largest opera companies: The Dutch National Opera, Opera Zuid, and the Nederlandse Reisopera, and was part of the 2022 Opera Forward Festival in Amsterdam.

== Plot ==
The opera tells the classic Greek Orpheus myth through the perspectives of Orphée (live theater + VR) and Eurydice (live theater + headphones).

=== Orphée Experience ===
In the Orphée Experience, the audience follows the story from Orphée's perspective, sometimes even literally following in his footsteps. The audience enters the installation through the Orphée entrance and are assigned a place. There singer/guitarist Orphée introduces himself. In the second act, they are guided out onto a balcony and are fitted with VR goggles, where they follow Orphée's perspective in the virtual world while walking and using hand movements. After the VR experience, they remove their VR headsets, and move on to the third act where Orphée comes to a conclusion about his feelings about their broken relationship.

=== Eurydice Experience ===
In the Eurydice Experience, the audience follows Eurydice's perspective, entering the installation through the Eurydice entrance, where they receive a pair of headphones. Eurydice, a dancer, introduces herself through a pre-recorded audio monologue. In the second act the audience enters the interior of the set. Surrounded by a pre-recorded, surround-sound choir, they can see and hear live how Orpheus, Eurydice and Amour tell their story, each in their own way. They finish their experience in the third act where Eurydice comes to a conclusion in her feelings about their relationship.

== Roles ==
Roles, voice types, premiere casts
Role	Type	Premiere Cast
Orphée	tenor	Lucas van Lierop
Eurydice	Dancer	Kalin Morrow & Tijana Prendovic
L'Amour (Eros)	Actor	Julia Akkermans

== Use of technology ==
Set: Designed by Maze de Boer, the sets were designed to allow two stories to be told simultaneously. Set design included consideration for all technological elements, as well as space for the cast to perform.

Projections: During the performance, text-messages between Orphée, l'Amour, and Eurydice can be seen at various times. These elements were designed to allow for character back-stories to be communicated to the audience. Projections are also used when members of the audience are back-lit while using their VR-headsets, creating choreographed shadows, viewed by other members of the audience.

Sound: Perhaps the most integral part of the OAE experience, the opera made use of several different kinds of live and pre-recorded sounds. Orphée sings live, often accompanying himself on guitar. Throughout the opera pre-recorded music is played through various speakers, triggered at specific point by an off-stage sound technician.

VR-Headsets: An integral part of the experience, all elements of the Virtual Reality portion of the opera were created by WeMakeVR. The headsets used were the Meta Quest 2.
