= Marchesa Casati (painting) =

1919 painting by Augustus John

- Artist: Augustus John
- Year: 1919
- Medium: Oil on canvas
- Dimensions: 96.5 cm × 68.6 cm (38.0 in × 27.0 in)
- Location: Art Gallery of Ontario, Toronto

The Marchesa Casati (Italian pronunciation: [marˈkeːza kaˈzaːti]) is a portrait of Luisa Casati by Augustus John, painted in oil on canvas in 1919. It is currently housed in the collection of the Art Gallery of Ontario (AGO) in Toronto. John made three paintings of the Marchesa, but the AGO one is the best known.

John had been attached to the Canadian forces as a war artist during the First World War, and was hired to make record of the Canadian participation at the Paris Peace Conference that year. While painting Robert Borden, the Canadian Prime Minister, and other dignitaries, he used the opportunity to join the Parisian artistic and cultural community. He met Casati at a party hosted in Paris by a mutual friend, Maria Ruspoli, and the two became lovers. In his memoirs, John described first meeting her:

"Her bearing, personality and peculiar elegance seemed to throw the rest of the company into the shade... The newcomer wore a tall hat of black velvet, the crown surrounded by an antique gold torque, the gift of D'Annunzio; her enormous eyes, set off by mascara, gleamed beneath a framework of canary coloured curls... She moved around the ballroom with supreme ease, while looking about her with an expression of slightly malicious amusement."

At this time Casati had already bedded a number of famous artists, and had been a subject for many others. Rather than present her in one of the mythological guises other artists had, John tried to capture her flamboyant, but at the same time guarded personality. He depicted the Marchesa with fiery red hair, highlighted by a muted background, that might evoke a stormy view of the Italian Alps near her home.

The painting was originally full length, but John cut it to only show the upper part of her body. It was purchased by the AGO in 1934 from Sir Evan Charteris, chairman of the National Portrait Gallery, for 1,500 pounds. Baron Duveen praised the purchase: "I consider it to be an astounding masterpiece of our time. It is no exaggeration to say that this will live forever." It has become one of the most popular pieces in the AGO, and one of the best known pieces by the general public. In 1987 the painting was the centerpiece of an exhibition at the AGO focusing on the Marchesa Casati. Toronto writer Lynn Crosbie wrote the poem "Colour Me Blood Red," for Casati, and her image appears on Crosbie's first collection of poems, Miss Pamela's Mercy (Coach House Press, 1992.) Toronto novelist Russell Smith later used the portrait as well for the cover of his novel Muriella Pent. Robert Fulford has extolled the portrait:

"One day around 1944, I fell in love with that portrait. I was in a group of school kids being escorted through what was then the Art Gallery of Toronto, now the Art Gallery of Ontario. Our guide stopped before John's portrait. Its romantic intensity caught me. Instantly, it became the first notable painting in my life. John, one of the marchesa's many lovers, saw her as a sexy, dangerous hellion. Exhibitionism was her art form. By entering a room, she turned everyone else into a spectator. Her lovers were her favourite audience. In the most pleasurable way, the marchesa disturbed my Toronto-reared sensibility. English-speaking Canada was then narrowly Protestant, and feelings were kept at a suitable distance. Our culture carried emotional reserve to an extreme – we were at the lunatic fringe of mental health, so to speak. In this stifling atmosphere, my affair with the marchesa turned me into a lover of portraits."

The Beat poet and novelist Jack Kerouac, in his San Francisco Blues (1954), included a number of poems inspired by this picture.

In 2021, Canadian author T.H. Cini wrote a fictional novelette based on meeting the Marchesa (Luisa Casati) in the narrators’ dreams. The story is called, The Eyes of a Marchesa from the book The Dream-Escape. It is based on the painting at the AGO.
