= Marchesa (brand) =

US women's wear brand

- Company type: Privately held company
- Industry: Fashion
- Founded: 2004
- Founder: Georgina Chapman, Keren Craig
- Headquarters: New York City
- Products: Women's dresses, wedding dresses, handbags, china
- Website: marchesa.com

Marchesa is an American brand specializing in women's wear, based in New York City. It was established in 2004 by Georgina Chapman and Keren Craig. Marchesa is known for designing dresses for several celebrities, including Scarlett Johansson, Jennifer Lopez, Cate Blanchett, Anne Hathaway, and Penélope Cruz.

== History ==
Marchesa is named after socialite Marchesa Luisa Casati. Founders Georgina Chapman and Keren Craig met at Chelsea College of Art and Design in London. Chapman, a graduate of the Wimbledon School of Art, began her career as a costume designer. Craig graduated from Brighton Art College focused on print and embroidery design. Chapman's draping and design paired with Craig's textile creations resulted in the establishment of Marchesa in 2004. Sienna Miller wore Marchesa on the cover of Vogue magazine's September 2007 issue (photographed by Mario Testino), which was the subject of the 2009 documentary, The September Issue.

=== Celebrities ===
The brand has been worn on the red carpet by actresses like: Sandra Bullock at the 2010 Academy Awards, Sarah Hyland at the 2013 MTV Video Music Awards, in 2016 Met Gala, Poppy Delevingne, Karolína Kurková, and Nina Dobrev.

== Products ==
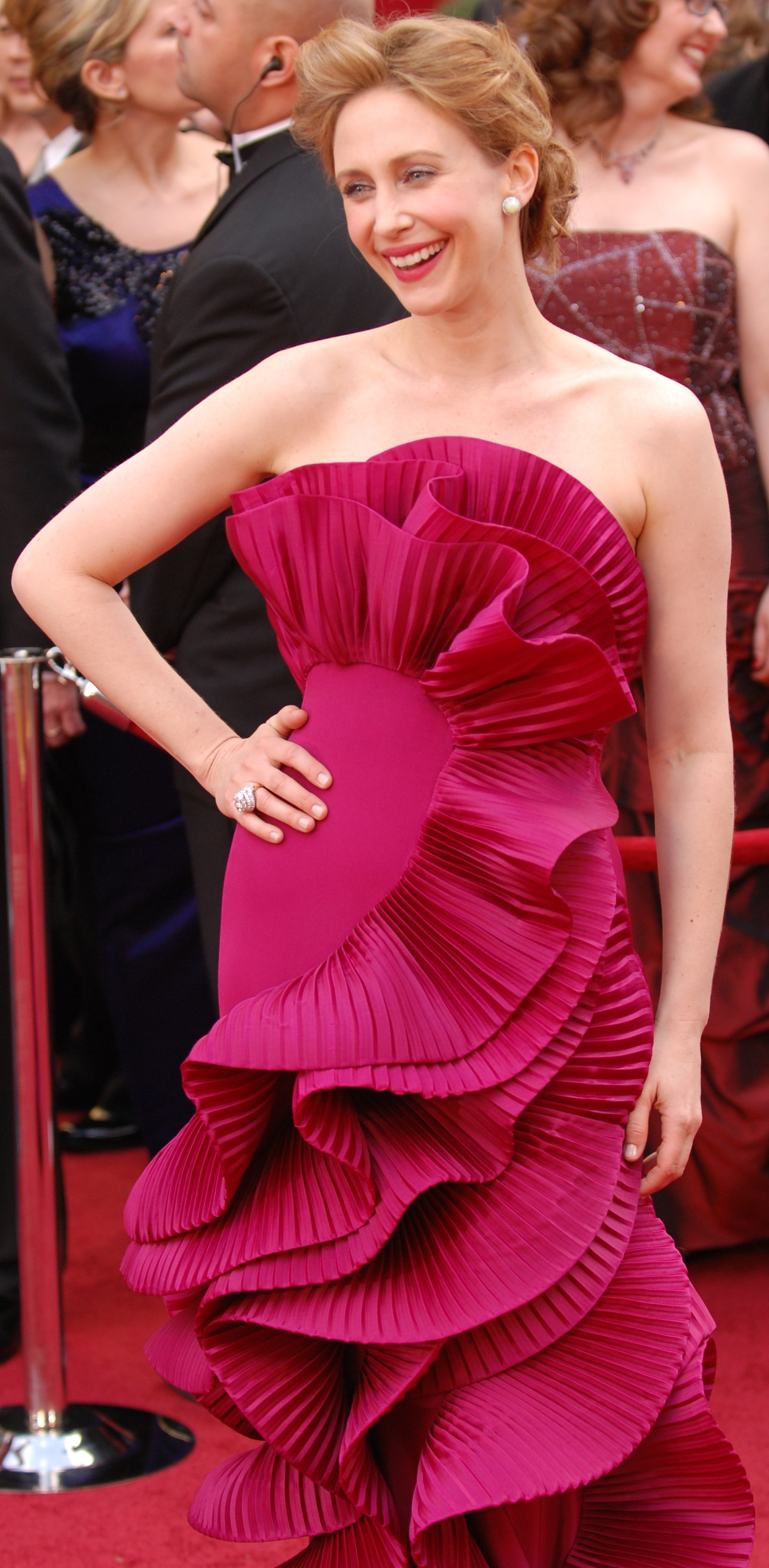
Vera Farmiga wearing Marchesa at the 82nd Academy Awards in 2010.

Marchesa launched a handbag line, wedding dress line, Marchesa Bridal Couture, and collaborated with Lenox on dinnerware designs.

In 2010, Marchesa collaborated with Le Métier de Beauty on a cosmetics line featuring the palettes of designers Chapman and Craig.

== Weinstein controversy ==
The success of the brand among celebrities was in part attributed to the influence of Miramax producer Harvey Weinstein, Chapman's then-husband. Weinstein reportedly pressured actresses who appeared in his films to wear the brand. After sexual abuse accusations against Weinstein emerged with allegations made by multiple actresses, Marchesa, once a mainstay of the red carpet, was shunned by celebrities attending various awards ceremonies in favor of other brands. In May 2018, Scarlett Johansson broke the months-long trend of red-carpet Marchesa avoidance by wearing a custom-made gown from the brand to the Met Gala.

After the Weinstein scandal broke, the Fall 2019 collection was presented by couture design director Anna Holvik and Notte design director Ceazar Cabreros instead of Chapman and Craig.

In June 2019, Craig announced her intention to leave Marchesa and was later replaced by Artur Sjakowska.
