= Willem Jeths =

Dutch composer (born 1959)

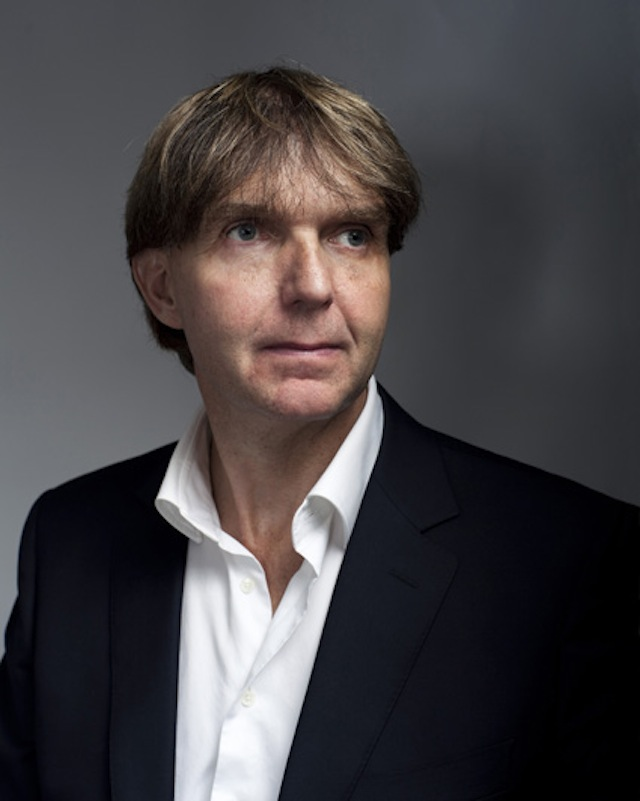
- Jeths in 2012

Background information
- Born: 31 August 1959 (age 66); Amersfoort, The Netherlands
- Genres: Contemporary classical
- Occupation: Composer
- Website: www.willemjeths.com

Willem Jeths (born 31 August 1959) is a Dutch classical composer.

== Early life ==
Jeths was born in Amersfoort. He started his musical career as a child with piano and music theory lessons in the Music School of Amersfoort with Paul Seeling. He originally studied in the Sweelinck Conservatory in Amsterdam, from 1980 to 1982. He continued with composition in the Conservatory of Utrecht with Hans Cox and Tristan Keuris. He finished his studies with Keuris in 1988. Parallel to composition Jeths studied musicology at the University of Amsterdam. He completed his studies with a doctoral dissertation about Elisabeth Kuyper (1877–1953), which was later published in the book Zes vrouwelijke componisten.

== Activities ==
Jeths is composition teacher at the Conservatory of Amsterdam since 2007. He was composition teacher at the Fontys Conservatory in Tilburg from 2003 to 2007. In the 2004–2005 season Jeths was composer-in-residence with Het Gelders Orkest and the Brabant Orchestra, and during the 2006–2007 season with the Orkest van het Oosten. In the year 2000 there was a three-day Willem Jeths Festival in Rotterdam. In November 2014 he was appointed by copyright organization BUMA/STEMRA as the first "Componist des Vaderlands" of The Netherlands.

== Compositions ==
Jeths has written many works for chamber music but he is mainly focused on works for orchestra.

Some of his compositions are:

- Ritratto (opera), premiered 2020 by the Dutch National - for Soprano, Mezzo-Soprano, Tenor, and vocal ensemble. Opera, with costumes by Jan Taminiau.
- The Tell-Tale Heart (2017) – for soprano and symphony orchestra (based upon a story by Edgar Allan Poe)
- Symfonie Nr. 1 (2012) – for orchestra and mezzo-soprano, commissioned by Zaterdag Matinee concert series from the Concertgebouw in Amsterdam.
- Metanoia (2012) – for symphony orchestra, commissioned by the Holland Symfonia.
- Scale -le tombeau de Mahler- (2010) – written for the Royal Concertgebouw Orchestra.
- Monument to a universal marriage (2011) – for string quartet, clarinet and two voices, commissioned by Best.
- Hôtel de Pékin – Dreams for a Dragon Queen (2008) – an opera with libretto by Friso Haverkamp. The premiere was in 2008 to celebrate the opening of the new opera theater in Enschede.
- MEME (2006) – for two violas and ensemble.
- Intus Trepidare (2003) – his 3rd string quartet commissioned by Kronos Quartet.
- Flügelhorn Concerto (2002) – commissioned by Royal Concertgebouw Orchestra.
- Chiasmos (2000) – a piano trio commissioned by the Osiris Trio.
- Vertooning (1997) – for harp solo, written for harpist Godelieve Schrama, who received the Philip Morris Finest Selection for music in 1994.
- Fas/Nefas (1997) – a piano concerto commissioned by the symphony orchestra of Osaka, Japan.
- Throb (1995) – written for the Rotterdam Philharmonic Orchestra and where the B-A-C-H theme is used.
- A bout de souffle (1993) – for the Asko Ensemble.
- Arcate (1990) – for the Raphaël String Quartet, a commission from the VARA-Matinee.

== Prizes and awards ==
Jeths won the Composition price from the Conservatory of Utrecht in 1988. His composition Novelette for violin and piano (1986) was selected for the ISCM World Music Days in 1990 in Oslo. During the Carl-Maria-von-Weber-Wettbewerb für Streichquartettkompositionen in Dresden in 1991, Jeths received a distinction award for his string quartet Arcate (1990). The following year Jeths received another distinction for the same work, but in the string orchestra version, part of the Music for string compositions competition from the Oare String Orchestra in Kent. His work Novelette was chosen by listeners of the radio program concertzender as the second prize for a competition celebrating 80 years of the existence of BUMA in 1993. In 1996, Jeths received the third prize in the Internationaler Wiener Kompositionswettbewerb for his violin concerto Glenz (1993).
