= Jan Taminiau =

Dutch fashion designer

- Born: 14 September 1975 (age 50); Goirle, Netherlands
- Education: Academy of Art and Design Artez
- Occupation: Fashion designer
- Label: JANTAMINIAU
- Awards: Roos Gesink Award, ‘Cultuur Mode Stipendium’ award from the Prins Bernhard Cultuurfonds, the “Grand Seigneur”

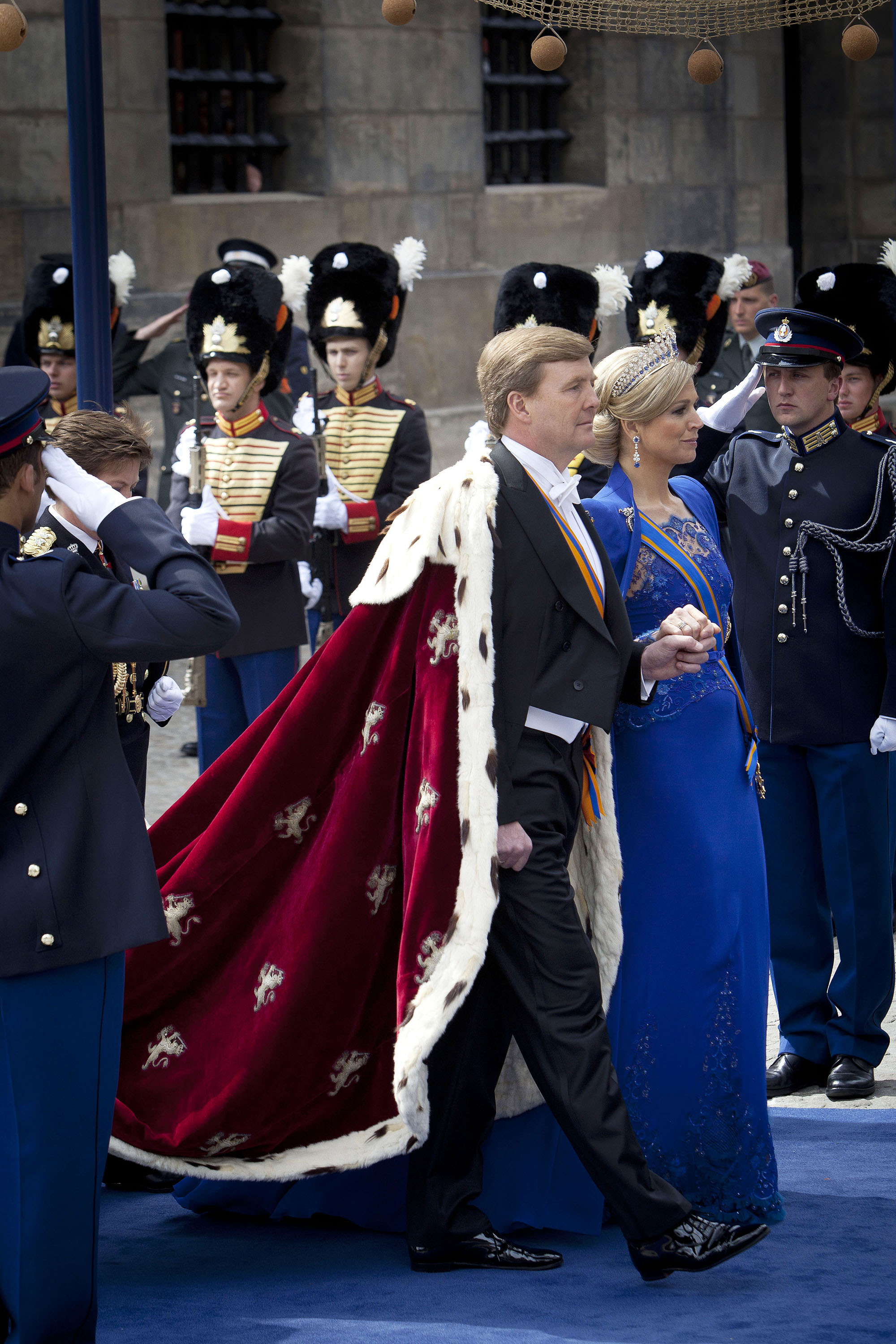
The blue dress and matching cape that Queen Maxima wore for the inauguration in 2013 was designed by Jan Taminiau

Jan Taminiau (born 14 September 1975) is a Dutch clothes designer who launched his own fashion label bearing his name (written as one word) in 2003. He designed a dress worn by Princess Maxima during the opening of the Mode Biennale exhibition in Arnhem in June 2009. Based in Amsterdam, Taminiau had an atelier located in the heart of the Red-Light prostitution district in Amsterdam. He designed the blue dress worn by Maxima at the investiture of Willem-Alexander.

== Early life ==
Jan was born in Goirle, the Netherlands. In 2001, Taminiau graduated cum laude from the Academy of Art in Arnhem Artez.

== Prizes and awards ==
2014 the Dutch oeuvre price the “Grand Seigneur”. 2014 "Marie Claire Prix de la Mode Best Dutch designer" 2013 the ‘Cultuur Mode Stipendium’ award from the Prins Bernhard Cultuurfonds. 2007 Marie Claire Prix de la Mode 2001 the Roos Gesink Award of best graduated student for his final year project at the Academy of Art and Design in Arnhem Artez.

In 2019 he was ambassador for the exhibition Jewels! The Glitter of the Russian Court at H'ART Museum. His 2005 design for a "Mail bag jacket" was represented in the exhibition by the jacket worn by Maxima in 2009.
